= Native American peoples of Oregon =

Indigenous people of the area now known as Oregon

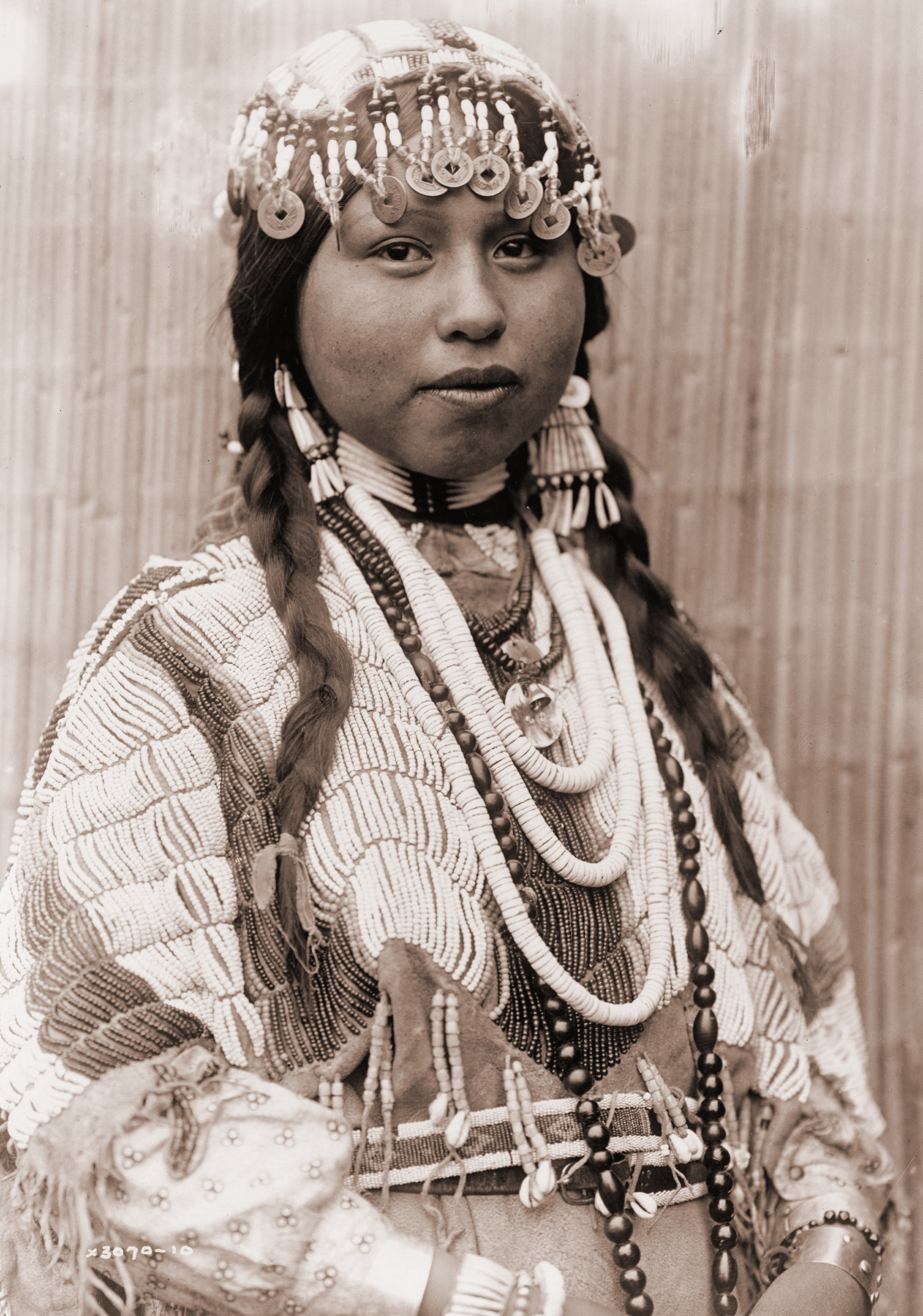
A Wishram woman in festive bridal raiment, 1911

The Native American peoples of Oregon are the set of Indigenous peoples who have inhabited or who still inhabit the area delineated in today's state of Oregon in the Pacific Northwest region of the United States. While the state of Oregon currently maintains relations with nine federally recognized tribal groups, the state was previously home to a much larger number of autonomous tribal groups, which today either no longer exist or have been absorbed into these larger confederated entities. Six of the nine tribes gained federal recognition in the late 20th century, after undergoing the termination and restoration of their treaty rights starting in the 1950s.

== History ==
=== Explorers, fur traders, and Indigenous peoples ===
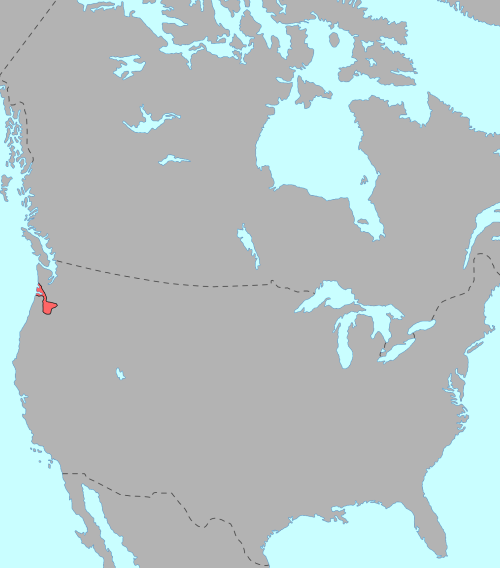
Region occupied by indigenous peoples speaking various Chinookan dialects at the time of the Lewis and Clark Expedition

No Native American group in the state of Oregon maintained a written language prior to the arrival of European Americans, nor for a considerable period thereafter. It is therefore necessary to make use of visitor accounts and the records and press of frequently hostile and poorly comprehending outsiders to reconstruct the story of the region's Indigenous peoples.

The Lewis and Clark Expedition of 1804 to 1806 traversed the Columbia River, which divides today's states of Oregon and Washington. Although other European and American sailors had traveled up and down the coast and made some contact with the Indigenous peoples who dwelt there, the Lewis and Clark party marked the first time that white Americans had lived among the Oregon tribes. The party made detailed records about those whom they encountered in their travels, thus providing the first written record of Oregon's Indigenous population.

The Lewis and Clark party spent its time among various tribal groups categorized as Chinook — peoples speaking dialects of the Chinookan language, which included the Kathlamet, Wasco and Wishram, Clatsop, and Clackamas nations. At the time of their expedition, Lewis and Clark estimated a population of approximately 16,000 for the various Chinook peoples, with other tribes in the Oregon Country pushing the total Indigenous population to perhaps 50,000.

After the departure of the Corps of Discovery, the earliest whites to enter the region were traders in furs, with the pelt of the river-dwelling beaver particularly desired. A written account by a fur trader was left to posterity by Ross Cox, who arrived on May 10, 1812, at the newly constructed Fort Astoria, located about 3 miles (4.8 km) south of Tongue Point at the mouth of the Columbia. Writing two decades after the fact, Cox recalled tension between the Indigenous population of the region and fur traders related to the attempted and actual theft of supplies by brazen native males, sometimes met with violence on the part of the whites.

Cox recalled the Chinook-speaking people he first encountered outside the fort as physically repugnant:

"They were the most uncouth-looking objects; and not strongly calculated to impress us with a favourable opinion of aboriginal beauty, or the purity of Indian manners. A few of the men were partially covered, but the greater number were unannoyed by vestments of any description. Their eyes were black, piercing, and treacherous; their ears slit up, and ornamented with strings of beads; the cartilage of their nostrils perforate and adorned with pieces of hyaquau placed horizontally; ... and their bodies besmeared with whale oil, gave them an appearance horribly disgusting. Then the women — Oh ye gods! With the same auricular, olfactory, and craniological peculiarities, they exhibited loose hanging breasts, short dirty teeth, skin saturated with blubber, bandy legs, and a waddling gait; while their only dress consisted of a kind of petticoat, or rather kilt, formed of small strands of cedar bark twisted into cords, and reaching from the waist to the knee."

Approximate geographic locations of the First Nations of today's Oregon and southern Washington state

Despite his physical aversion, Cox and his associates traveled freely to the villages of several tribes that dotted the mouth of the Columbia, noting that "the natives generally received us with friendship and hospitality." Over time, Cox's opinions became more specific, and he came to characterize the Kathlamets as "the most tranquil," the Tillamook as "the most roguish," and the Clatsops as "the most honest." He considered the Chilwitz people's practice of enhancing their conception of beauty by binding the skulls of infants to flatten foreheads to be repellant.

Venturing up the Columbia by canoe for the first time in June 1812, according to Cox's testimony, no problematic contact was made with Native American inhabitants until the party reached the first unnavigable rapids on the Columbia about 170 miles (270 km) upriver. Cox found these "incontestably more filthy and ugly" than the coastal tribes and seemed to have been divided into family groups that "seemed quite independent of the other" and not subject to the control of a single chief. Throughout the journey, trading was practiced in which tobacco and "trifling presents" were exchanged for salmon that supplemented the party's provisions.

Forced to carry provisions around rapids again several days later, the party again ran into trouble with the attempted theft of unattended goods, which was met with musket fire and the wounding of one of the perpetrators. Similar problems and conflicts occurred at portage areas on the return trip in October 1812, including a confrontation with "fifty or sixty Indians, with their war-shirts on, and fully armed," who attempted to stop the returning fur traders, apparently with a view of robbing them. Two bales of goods were stolen, causing hostages to be taken to compel their return.

Further inland, other distinct tribes, armed and riding horses, were met, with the horsemen noted to be "clean" and wearing "handsome leathern shirts and leggings" and possessing "a bold daring manner, which we did not observe with any of the tribes from the sea upwards." Other local tribes, without horses, again showed little compunction about attempted theft. A recent state of war between the horse-mounted and foot-traveling tribes was noted.

Still further upriver, Cox met the Walla Walla, whom he recalled as "decidedly the most friendly tribe we had seen on the river," bearing "an air of open unsuspecting confidence in their manner" which "at once banished suspicion and ensured our friendship." Cox wrote of the tribe:

"We visited several families in the village; and the moment we entered, the best place was selected for us, and a clean mad spread to sit on; while the inmates, particularly the women and the children, remained at a respectful distance, without manifesting any of the obtrusive curiosity about our arms or clothing, by which we were so much annoyed among the lower tribes. The females, also, were distinguished by a degree of attentive kindness, totally removed from the disgusting familiarity of the kilted ladies below the rapids, and equally free from an affection of prudery; prostitution is unknown among them; and I believe no inducement would tempt them to commit a breach of chastity."

=== Arrival of the Anglo missionaries ===
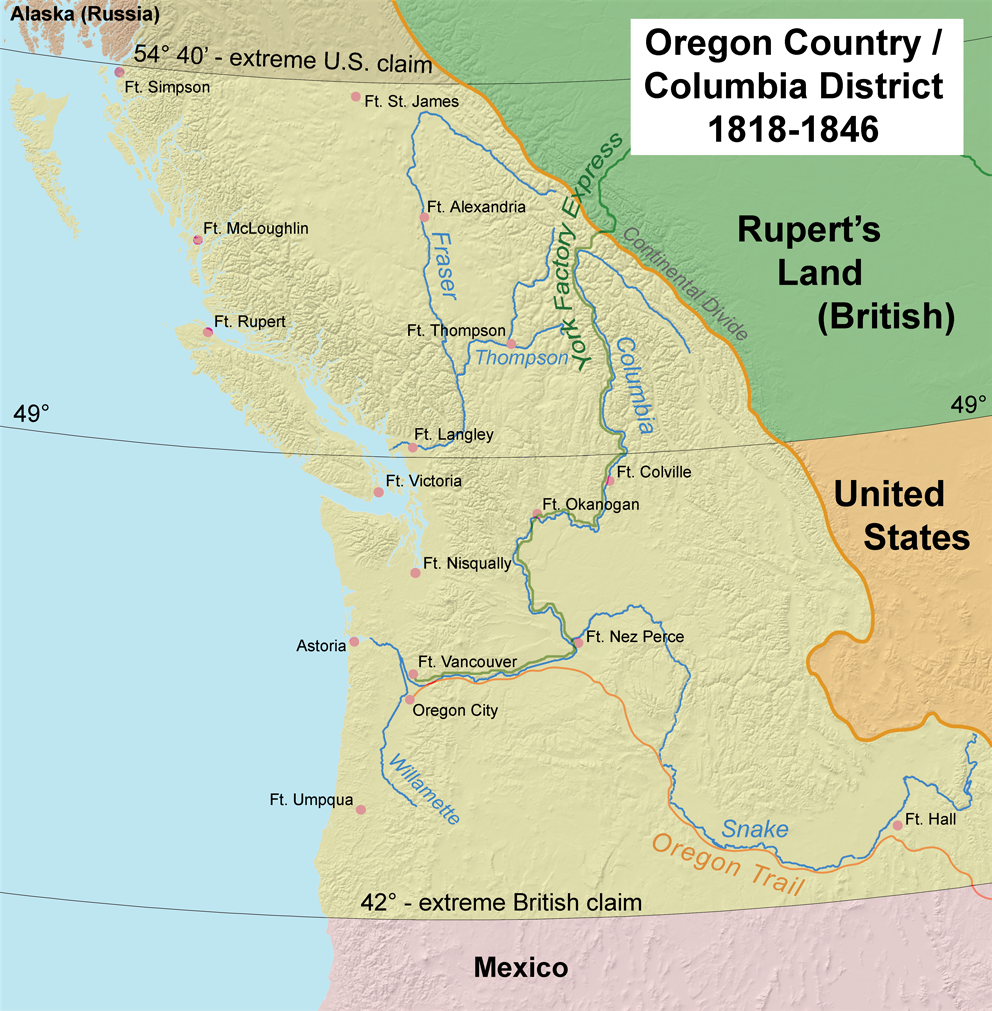
Map illustrating British and American territorial designs in the Pacific Northwest

Despite the myriad of tribal entities spread throughout the Oregon Country, their historical occupation and implicit claim to the land was barely noted and not recognized by white Americans in the East. In 1828, New England teacher Hall Jackson Kelley, a leading exponent of white colonization of the Oregon Country, hailed the region as "the most valuable of all the unoccupied parts of the earth" in a memorial to Congress.

Kelley's enthusiasm was shared by others, seeking access to what they perceived as uninhabited land and willing to engage in building new communities on the frontier. European American colonization of the Oregon Country began in earnest in 1829 with the establishment of Oregon City on the confluence of the Clackamas and Willamette rivers by John McLoughlin, chief factor for the region of Hudson's Bay Company.

The newcomers of the 1820s brought with them diseases for which the native populations of the Oregon Country had no immunity. Waves of disease swept Native American communities between 1824 and 1829, with smallpox, measles, and an unknown ailment described at the time as "ague fever" annihilating tens of thousands. It is reckoned by one observer that 80% of the native population died in a single summer, with villages depopulated and the bare remnants of some tribal groups absorbed into others.

On December 11, 1838, US Senator Lewis F. Linn of Missouri introduced a bill calling for the occupation of the Oregon Country region north of 42 degrees latitude and west of the Rocky Mountains. A fort was to be established on the Columbia River and the new entity was to be subject to rule by the military force of the United States and subject to the tax laws thereof. The stage was thereby set for conflict between the American government in Washington, D.C., and the bands of indigenous peoples who had historically inhabited the area so claimed.

Missionaries headed by the Methodist Jason Lee were the advance guard of European American colonization, with a large "Indian church" established at The Dalles in 1839 in an effort to convert members of the Klickitat tribe to Christianity. Lee also set out to build a new settlement at the mouth of the Umpqua River, familial grounds of the Umpqua tribe. Lee and his party traversed the region among a tolerant native population, which, as one early historian noted, was found by the missionaries to be "easily impressed, and apt at imitating the forms of devotion."

Ever since the first arrival of European trappers and traders, the native peoples of the Columbia Basin were swept by epidemics of newly introduced diseases that annihilated a vast percentage of the population. Lee's party found that the population in the region that he visited had been reduced to less than 375 people, and believed that the life expectancy of even these survivors was limited. Plans for a new mission in the Umpqua River valley were consequently abandoned.

The Methodists continued to harbor grand designs upon the new territory. A mission-owned lumber mill was established, as was a "manual-labor school," intended to instruct the indigenous population in the ways of domestic industry. Following a May 1841 meeting of the territorial Methodist society, a $10,000 building was erected in the vicinity of today's city of Salem on the Chemeketa Plain. The group established there a school for the native population, which was operated for nine months before being abandoned in the spring of 1843 for lack of success.

Additional European-American immigrants began to arrive in this period, with growth centered at Oregon City, which grew from nor more than 3 or 4 buildings to about 30 by the spring of 1843. At the behest of Jason Lee, an Indian Agent was appointed by the federal government to administer its affairs in the Oregon Country. Elijah White was appointed to this position early in 1842 by the administration of President John Tyler, who declined to name a governor for the region at that time. White was also given verbal permission to make use of government funds for the necessary expenses associated with his office.

Not long after his arrival at Fort Vancouver, the de facto head of the American presence in the Oregon Country found himself tested by worsening relations between white settlers and the various indigenous peoples. Members of the Cayuse tribe burned a mill located at the Waiilatpu religious mission near today's Walla Walla, while further east the Nez Perce were believed to be on the verge of violence against colonists at Lapwai, a place that is today part of the Idaho Panhandle. Rumors swept the region's settlers that the Native American tribes were uniting to launch a coordinated attack aimed at the annihilation of the white community. A heavily armed party of eight, traveling with two interpreters, set out on an expedition to end the perceived threat.

The Americans were joined en route by a representative of British commercial operations in the region so as to present a united front. Indian Agent White unilaterally presented a set of laws at a meeting with the Nez Perce addressing the concerns of white settlers and forced them to choose a head chief and sub-chiefs. These officials were to be held collectively responsible for the good conduct of their people, White declared. Similar terms were later forced upon the Cayuse.

=== Racism and violence ===
As settlers began to flood into the Oregon Country from points east, they brought with them racist attitudes about the indigenous peoples of the region. By the end of the 1840s, more than 9,000 American and foreign national settlers occupied the Oregon Territory, exclusive of "the aborigines of the country, half-breeds, and Hawaiians." Some of the more violent members of this white population periodically engaged in acts of violence in attempts to displace and destroy local Native American communities. In 1849 one or more residents of Linn City launched a nighttime arson attack on a Native American village, destroying the winter provisions of the band.

Nor was property crime the extent of damage inflicted upon the Native American populations. One contemporary settler, the naturalized English expatriate John Beeson, left Illinois for Oregon in March 1853, arriving in the Rogue River Valley at the end of September. He remained in Oregon for three years before leaving, repelled by what he saw, returning to the East to write a book about the abuses suffered by the native population at the hands of white settlers. Beeson wrote

"Owing to a scarcity of water during several months of the year, the Miners have no work. Their food, meanwhile, consists principally of fine bread and beef; and they generally use abundance of tobacco and whisky. Thus the quality of the food, and the poisons, in connection with a stimulating atmosphere, excite their baser passions; and, in the absence of moral restraint and civil law, they seek indulgence by outrages on the persons of defenseless Indians. I forbear the recital of horrors. Any American father or mother can easily imagine what would be the fate of their daughters if, unprotected and isolated, in valleys and ravines, surrounded by hosts of men of the class and under the circumstances above described. It is no palliation to say, that the females are willing victims; for it is notorious that their fathers and brothers are often shot in order to gain forcible possession. We should realize the magnitude of this wrong, if we consider what execration and punishment we inflict upon another Race for such violations of our own."

Some white settlers successfully induced the native population to trade women for provisions and armaments. It was to no small extent this trade of flesh for firearms that provided the tribes of Southern Oregon with sufficient means to maintain a resistance during the Rogue River War of 1855–1856.

Genocidal attitudes were commonplace, including expressed sentiments that every "Indian" should be destroyed from the Pacific Coast to the Rocky Mountains and a vicious witticism that if a white man should encounter a "Buck" Indian and a buck deer at the same time, they should shoot the man and leave the deer to run.

=== The Rogue River Wars (1855–1856) ===
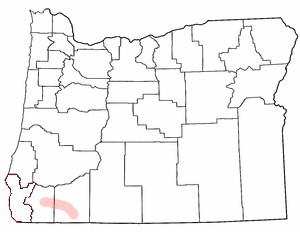
Map showing the location of the Rogue River Valley within the post-1859 boundaries of the state of Oregon

The indigenous peoples of Southern Oregon were filled with alarm and terror over the brutality that they faced at the hands of white miners and settlers. Appeals to white authorities for protection went unheeded.

In the summer of 1855, an anonymous letter signed simply "A Miner" appeared in the Oregon Statesman. This letter predicted imminent and bloody massacres to be carried out by the "Red Skins" against the white population of Oregon. This claim was picked up by the Sub-Indian Agent for Southern Oregon, who convened a mass meeting in a Willamette Valley town and formally made the call to raise 3,000 troops from the citizenry to do battle with the menace. A war frenzy swept the Oregon Territory, with newspaper opinion up and down the coast, from the Washington Territory to Northern California, virtually unanimous for war.

Governor George Law Curry obliged the popular demand and issued a proclamation declaring war, urging that a volunteer militia take the field immediately. A frenzy of extreme violence followed—native populations were uprooted from their villages, driven through the countryside, and many were killed, including 27 natives killed in October by settlers during a raid on a village. Native Americans responded by burning of a white homestead and killing 27 settlers in revenge; this was pointed to by adherents of the campaign that to continue war.

John Beeson later wrote of the Rogue River War which he witnessed:

"During the years of 1855-6, as many as twenty murders were committed by the Indians; and several of them were prosecuted and hung according to law. But no account was kept of murdered Indians; and yet it was a matter of common talk, that they were shot whenever it could be done with safety to the shooter."

The fledgling Oregon press provided propaganda that rationalized the war against Native Americans. One paper opined on November 10, 1855, that

"The Indians are ignorant, abject, and debased by nature, whose minds are as incapable of instruction as their bodies are of labor.... They have nothing in common with Humanity but the form; and God has sent us to destroy them, as he did to the Israelites of old to similar tribes."

The war ended in June 1856, and resulted in 100 Rogue River Indians killed and 94 soldiers, militia, or settlers killed. The Tolowa people and other tribes were moved to reservations after the war.

=== Dispossession and the reservation system ===
From 1850 to 1855, the Oregon Donation Land Act entitled white male settlers arriving in present-day Oregon to 320 acres of land apiece, while also legitimizing the land claims made by those who had already arrived and claimed land. The law also applied to "American half-breed Indians" who made claims on the land. The Donation Land Act came into effect before treaties or land cessions were negotiated with Oregon's indigenous peoples, and so allowed white settlers to claim lands already occupied by Native American tribes. Eventually, over 2.5 million acres of land were claimed, and with the influx of settlers came increased conflict and so-called "race wars" between themselves and Oregon's indigenous peoples, such as the Rogue River Wars (as discussed previously).

However, under agreements made with England concerning the turnover of the Oregon Territory to the US, the United States had agreed to respect the land rights of indigenous peoples living within the territory. Therefore, the US was legally unable to allow settlement in the area without making land cession treaties with tribal groups. To get around the issue, the United States Congress passed the Indian Treaty Act the same year that the Oregon Donation Land Act went into effect, which allowed for the appointment of commissioners who would negotiate land cession treaties with, as well as the possible removal of, Native American tribes.

The decade following the implementation of both acts saw the signing of treaties with indigenous groups throughout the Oregon territory, including the Warm Springs and Wasco tribes (1855), the Siletz (1855), the Cow Creek band (1853), the Umatilla (1855), and the Kalapuya (1855). Several tribes living in the Willamette Valley were originally successful in retaining their rights to the lands they inhabited at the time; however, those treaty agreements were never ratified by the US, and subsequent negotiations by superintendent Joel Palmer resulted in the confederation of the Willamette Valley tribes and their removal to a reservation.

Many tribes were forcibly removed to reservations, including the Warm Springs Reservation, the Umatilla Reservation, and the Coast Indian Reservation. The latter was quickly altered soon after its creation; the reservation lost a significant portion of its original land and was divided into the Grand Ronde and Siletz Reservations.

=== Termination ===
The termination era of the mid-20th century saw the end of federal recognition status for over 100 indigenous tribes, primarily in the Western US. In the 1950s, Oregon tribes rapidly lost their rights to legal jurisdiction and federal recognition, as the United States government brought an end to their responsibilities towards indigenous nations that were previously guaranteed by treaty agreements.

==== Public Law 280 ====
In 1953, several indigenous nations in Oregon and four other states lost sole legal jurisdiction over their own territories through Public Law 280, passed by the US Congress. Under this law, state law enforcement took over the ability to prosecute certain civil and criminal offenses involving tribal members, as well as offenses that took place within a tribe's territory, from tribal governments. The Burns Paiute Tribe, the Confederated Tribes of Warm Springs, and the Confederated Tribes of the Umatilla Reservation are all exempt from this law.

==== Klamath Termination Act ====
Public Law 587, passed in 1954, terminated the trust relationships between the Klamath tribe, the Modoc tribe, the Yahooskin Band of Snake Indians, and the United States government, and initiated the process of transitioning the supervision of indigenous lands away from the federal government and into private hands.

The Klamath Tribes were terminated in part because the federal government judged them to be ready for self-management and assimilation. At the time, a booming lumber industry on Klamath lands had enriched the local economy, making the Klamath one of the richest indigenous nations. The federal government held that selling off the Klamath's timberlands and distributing the payouts among enrolled Klamath members would help build individual wealth, thereby contributing to the goal of assimilation and independence from federal oversight.

Additionally, in a hearing for the proposed termination act, Orme Lewis, then-Assistant Secretary of the Interior, noted that:

"... the Klamath Tribe and the individual members thereof have in general attained sufficient skill and ability to manage their own affairs without special Federal assistance. Through intermarriage with non-Indians and cooperative work and association with their non-Indian neighbors ... these people have been largely integrated into all phases of the economic and social life of the area. The standard of living of the Klamath Indians compares favorably with that of their non-Indian neighbors. Their dress is modern, and there remains little vestige of religious or other traditional Indian customs. Most of them live in modern homes.... Farms are mechanized with modern machinery ... the Klamath tribe has been considered one of the most advanced Indian groups in the United States, and much consideration has been given to the possibility of terminating Federal supervision...."

As reservation lands were divided up and sold, more than three-quarters of enrolled Klamath tribal members chose to receive the value of their share in cash, while the remainder opted to keep their share of the land in trust. Eventually, however, the land held in trust was also sold, and all tribal members received payments for their shares. The act did, however, stipulate that the Klamath would retain their water and fishing rights as established by treaty; these rights were later upheld in federal court.

==== Western Oregon Indian Termination Act ====
Public Law 588, also known as the Western Oregon Indian Termination Act, was passed by the US Congress in the same year as the Klamath Termination Act. The act ended the official recognition by the federal government of sixty tribal bands west of the Cascade mountain range, negating the existing trust relationship via previous treaty agreements, and ending services provided to tribal nations by the federal government. After receiving various options for what to do with their common lands, both tribes chose to sell off some or all of their tribal land holdings. Following this decision, the Confederated Tribes of Siletz Indians and the Confederated Tribes of the Grand Ronde Community were required to register member rolls with the federal government, which were used to disburse funds from the sales equally among tribal members. Members of the Siletz confederation received $542.50 per person, while members of the Grand Ronde confederation received $35 each.

=== Restoration ===
Following the termination of their trust relationships with the federal government, six indigenous tribes successfully engaged in decades of lobbying and Congressional hearings in an effort to regain their lands and have their sovereignty recognized again.

Tribe	Date of Termination	Date of Reinstatement
Confederated Tribes of Siletz Indians	1955	1977
Cow Creek Band of Umpqua Tribe of Indians	1954	1982
Confederated Tribes of the Grand Ronde Community of Oregon	1954	1983
Confederated Tribes of Coos, Lower Umpqua, and Siuslaw Indians	1956	1984
Klamath Tribes	1954	1986
The Coquille Tribe	1954	1989

==== 1977: Confederated Tribes of Siletz Indians ====
From 1975 to 1976, the Siletz people gave testimonies and sent lobbyists to the US Congress in support of the Siletz Restoration Act. Sponsored by Oregon Senator Mark Hatfield, the Act would restore federal recognition status to the Siletz and grant them "all Federal services and benefits" applicable to recognized tribes. The Act did not, however, restore reservation lands or hunting, fishing, or trapping rights. The Act was approved in 1977 as Public Law 95–195, and the Siletz exist today as the Confederated Tribes of Siletz Indians. The Siletz were officially granted the rights to 3,063 acres of reservation lands three years later, under Public Law 96-340. In 2016, Public Law No. 114-262 came into effect; the law restored the additional lands that were originally granted to the Siletz as part of the Coast Indian Reservation in 1855, to be held in trust for them by the federal government.

==== 1982: Cow Creek Band of Umpqua Tribe of Indians ====
The Cow Creek Band of Umpqua Tribe of Indians were next to be restored, under Public Law 97–391 in 1982. The Cow Creek Band received federal recognition and services, but there was no restoration or creation of reservation lands. In 2018, the Western Oregon Tribal Fairness Act restored over 17 thousand acres of land to the Cow Creek Band, which are now held in trust for them by the US federal government.

==== 1983: Confederated Tribes of the Grand Ronde Community ====
In 1983, the Confederated Tribes of the Grand Ronde Community of Oregon came together and regained federal status under the Grand Ronde Restoration Act, after engaging in lobbying, fundraising efforts, and testimony before the United States Congress. The Grand Ronde Reservation Act went into effect in 1988, and returned to the Grand Ronde Community 9,811 acres of land that had initially been granted to them within the original Grand Ronde Reservation. In 2016, the same bill that restored the original reservation lands of the Siletz also enabled the U.S. Department of the Interior to more easily accept land parcels given to the tribes in trust - in other words, making it easier for the Grand Ronde Community to regain their treaty lands.

==== 1984: Confederated Tribes of Coos, Lower Umpqua, and Siuslaw Indians ====
The Confederated Tribes of Coos, Lower Umpqua, and Siuslaw Indians were restored to federal recognition and granted reservation lands in 1984 after the passage of the Coos, Lower Umpqua, and Siuslaw Restoration Act. Under the Act, the state of Oregon retained civil and criminal jurisdiction over tribal members. The Western Oregon Tribal Fairness Act, which also restored the lands of the Cow Creek Band in 2018, put over 14,000 acres of land in trust for the Coos, Lower Umpqua, and Siuslaw.

==== 1986: Klamath Tribes ====
The Klamath Tribes, a confederation of the Klamath, Modoc, and Yahooskin peoples, were restored to federal recognition status in 1986 under the Klamath Indian Tribe Restoration Act. While their treaty rights were restored, the Klamath did not regain any of their previous reservation lands.

== Native Americans in contemporary Oregon ==
Map of Indian reservations in Oregon.

=== Federally recognized tribes in Oregon ===
Today, Oregon's indigenous peoples have consolidated into nine federally-recognized tribal groupings:

- Burns Paiute Tribe
- Confederated Tribes of Coos, Lower Umpqua and Siuslaw Indians
- Confederated Tribes of Grand Ronde
- Confederated Tribes of Siletz Indians
- Confederated Tribes of the Umatilla Indian Reservation
- Confederated Tribes of Warm Springs
- Cow Creek Band of Umpqua Tribe of Indians
- Coquille Indian Tribe
- Klamath Tribes

Additionally, some of the lands of the Nevada-based Fort McDermitt Paiute and Shoshone Tribe are located within present-day Oregon.

=== Representation in state government ===
As of 2020, there have been two representatives in the Oregon State Legislature of indigenous descent:

- Tawna Sanchez, of Shoshone-Bannock, Ute, and Carrizo descent, currently serves in the Oregon House of Representatives, where she has been since 2017.
- Jackie Taylor, of Citizen Potawatomi Nation, served in the Oregon House of Representatives from 1991 to 2000.

=== Government-to-government relations ===
Established in 1975, Oregon's Legislative Commission on Indian Services (LCIS) represents the interests of indigenous nations located within the state of Oregon to the state government. The commission is made up of 13 members who are nominated by local tribes and selected by the legislature, and is intended to be a means of communication between state and tribal governments to inform their respective decision-making processes. Oregon was the first state to establish such a commission for its state legislature.

In 2001, Oregon's Senate Bill 770 established "government to government" relations between tribal nations and the Oregon State Government. This bill created ORS 182.162-168, which further codified the legal relationships between the state of Oregon and the nine federally-recognized tribes located within the bounds of the state. The "Oregon Approach" was the first such bill passed in the United States, creating a framework for more complex intergovernmental relations while also acknowledging the inherent sovereignty of tribes. As Karen Quigley, then-Executive Director of the LCIS, noted in 2013:

"Tribal sovereign governments- like other governments- means at a minimum that each of Oregon’s nine federally recognized tribal governments has a distinctive legal and political status separate from other sovereigns including other tribal governments. Like other governments, each tribal sovereign has the inherent authority to govern its people and see to their health, safety and welfare, decide requirements for citizenship, pass laws & regulations, tax and spend, create infrastructure and provide governmental services to its citizen members. Tribal governments are not "granted sovereignty." ... [They] are the oldest form of sovereigns in Oregon by thousands of years."

=== Curriculum in state schools ===
The state of Oregon's Tribal History/Shared History law was created in 2017 via Senate Bill 13. Under this law, the Oregon Department of Education and Oregon's nine federally-recognized tribes will work together to develop curriculum that expands the English, math, social studies, science, and health lessons taught in Oregon's public schools to include the history and culture of the state's indigenous peoples. The curriculum will also be "community-based", meaning that students attending public schools near one of the nine tribes will be given lessons relating to the history and culture of that specific tribe.

== Population ==
Below are numbers for US citizens self-identifying to recognized tribal grouping, according to the 2010 US census

Tribal grouping	American Indian and Alaska Native alone		American Indian and Alaska Native in combination with one or more races		American Indian and Alaska Native tribal grouping alone or in any combination
Tribal grouping	One tribal grouping reported	More than one tribal grouping reported	One tribal grouping reported	More than one tribal grouping reported	
Total	11,359	6,280	6,280	1,356	22,275
Burns Paiute Tribe	106	0	28	0	134
Yahooskin	1	22	7	1	31
Coquille	483	6	196	4	689
Tolowa	523	43	320	24	910
Upper Umpqua	657	6	251	10	924
Undefined Oregon Athabascan	71	21	108	25	225
Clatsop	26	31	41	24	122
Wasco	0	1	2	3	6
Undefined Chinook	766	74	1,097	144	2,081
Walla Walla	134	120	82	47	383
Umatilla	1,780	216	567	47	2,610
Tenino	8	1	6	94	2,657
Alsea	1	4	2	0	15
Siuslaw people	32	30	26	0	88
Coos people	202	35	140	11	396
Lower Umpqua People	205	31	117	19	396
Shasta	526	108	621	22	1,277
Siletz	2,757	21	1,107	96	3,981
Tillamook	19	29	24	18	90
Kalapuya	44	13	7	116	180
Klamath	2,5282	519	1,087	279	4,413
Modoc	464	481	406	289	1,640
Molala	17	3	10	51	81
Cayuse	104	117	21	31	273
Takelma	5	3	7	1	16

== See also ==
- Alsea people
- Atfalati people
- Bannock people
- Cayuse people
- Chetco people
- Chinook people
- Clackamas people
- Clatsop people
- Coquille people
- Coos people
- Kalapuya people
- Klamath people
- Klickitat people
- Latgawa people
- Modoc people
- Molala people
- Multnomah people
- Neerchokikoo
- Northern Paiute people
- Sahaptin people
- Santiam people
- Shasta people
- Siletz people
- Siuslaw people
- Takelma people
- Tenino people
- Tillamook people
- Tolowa people
- Tututni people
- Umatilla people
- Umpqua people
- Wasco and Wishram peoples
- Burns Paiute Tribe
- Warm Springs tribes
- Confederated Tribes of Coos, Lower Umpqua and Siuslaw Indians
- Confederated Tribes of Grand Ronde
- Confederated Tribes of Siletz Indians
- Confederated Tribes of Warm Springs
- Confederated Tribes of the Umatilla Indian Reservation
- Cow Creek Band of Umpqua Tribe of Indians
- Klamath Tribes
- Coquille Indian Tribe
- Oregon Superintendent of Indian Affairs
- Alsea language
- Coosan languages
- Chinook languages
- Klamath language (Lutuamian)

== Works cited ==
- Hubert Howe Bancroft, The Works of Hubert Howe Bancroft: Volume 29: History of Oregon, Vol. 1, 1834-1848. San Francisco, CA: The History Company, 1886.
- John Beeson, A Plea for the Indians: With Facts and Features of the Late War in Oregon. Third Edition. New York: John Beeson, 1858.
- Charles Henry Carey, History of Oregon: Volume 1. Chicago: Pioneer Historical Publishing Co., 1922.
- Ross Cox, Adventures on the Columbia River: Including the Narrative of a Residence of Six Years on the Western Side of the Rocky Mountains Among Various Tribes of Indians Hitherto Unknown, Together with a Journey Across the American Continent. New York: J. & J. Harper, 1832.
- Samuel Chenery Downing, A Journey to Lower Oregon and Upper California, 1848-49. San Francisco: John J. Newbegin, 1927.
- Carlos A. Schwantes, The Pacific Northwest: An Interpretive History. Lincoln, NE: University of Nebraska Press, 1989.
