= Western Oregon Indian Termination Act =

1954 United States federal law

The Western Oregon Indian Termination Act or Public Law 588, was passed in August 1954 as part of the United States Indian termination policy. It called for the termination of federal supervision over the trust and restricted property of numerous Native American bands and small tribes, all located west of the Cascade Mountains in Oregon. The act also called for disposition of federally owned property which had been bought for the administration of Indian affairs, and for termination of federal services which these Indians received under federal recognition. The stipulations in this act were similar to those of most termination acts.

== Tribes and bands ==
The Western Oregon Indian Termination Act was unique because of the number of tribes it affected. In all, 61 tribes in Western Oregon were terminated, more than the total tribes terminated under all other individual acts. However, it appears that authorities named every tribe that had been named in various treaties over the years. A review of the 1890 and 1930 censuses shows that several of the named tribes in the termination act reported no members. In addition, the history of the area, with the Coastal Reservation being established by Executive Order and not treaty, then separated into the Siletz and Grande Ronde Reservations, then those two reservations being combined, and yet again separated, makes the situation complicated and difficult to ascertain specific data.

The 1930 census report notes that there were people who reported that they were Indian but did not denote a tribe in almost every state. In addition, it combines groups into language stock and tribes; however, "tribe" may reflect all speakers rather than separate bands and tribes. The total number of Indians affiliated with the language groups were as follows:

- Athapaskan (1930=504; 1910=656)
- Chinookan (1930=561; 1910=897)
- Kalapooian (1930=45; 1910=106)
- Kusan (1930=107; 1910=93)
- Salish (1930=9; 1910=18)
- Shastan (1930= 138; 1910=177)
- Waiilatpuan (1930=193; 1910=302)
- Yakonan (1930=7; 1910=55)

The totals in Oregon for 1930 were 1,564. In comparison, the numbers for the 1910 census for these same groups represented a population of 2,304. On June 22, 1956, the final roll of the Confederated Tribes of Siletz contained 929 names. On April 14, 1956, the Federal Register published the final roll of the Confederated Tribes of Grand Ronde which contained 862 names. The combined total of these two confederations' population was 1,791, though there may well have been scattered native peoples in the coastal region who were not affiliated with these reservations.

== Restoration acts ==
There were five restoration acts that restored all of the bands who had tribe members that had been located on the Grand Ronde or Silez Reservations. Some of these tribes were restored with those acts and later obtained their own federal recognition.

The Chinook Indian Nation is made up of the five westernmost Tribes of Chinookan peoples, Lower Chinook, Willapa and Wahkiakum in Washington State plus Clatsop and Cathlamet in Oregon. The Chinook Nation is seeking Tribal recognition.

Western Oregon Indians
	As Listed on Treaty	Tribal entity	Language Stock	Merger with Other Reservation	Date of Reinstatement	Date of Land Restoration	Details
1.	Alsea	Alsiya Indians	Yakonan	Confederated Tribes of Siletz Indians	1977 as part of the Siletz Confederation	1977 as part of the Siletz Confederation	As of the 1890 census, there were no members of this tribe enumerated who were not in the confines of the Siletz Reservation. Comments in the 1930 US Federal Census state, "The report of the Office of Indian Affairs for 1932 shows 13 Alsea and Yaquina enrolled at the Siletz Reservation of whom 5 are residing there and 8 elsewhere." It also indicates that the 1910 Census showed 29 Alsea, 7 Siuslaw, and 19 Yaquina living in Oregon.
2.	Applegate Creek	Applegate Creek Tribe	Athapascan	Confederated Tribes of Siletz Indians	1977 as part of the Siletz Confederation	1977 as part of the Siletz Confederation	As of the 1890 census, there were no members of this tribe enumerated who were not in the confines of the Siletz Reservation.
3.	Calapooya	Kalapuya Indians	Kalapooian	Confederated Tribes of the Grand Ronde Community and Confederated Tribes of Siletz Indians	1977 as part of the Siletz Confederation and/or 1983 as Grand Ronde Confederation	1977 as part of the Siletz Confederation and/or 1983 as Grand Ronde Confederation	Various bands of this group were incorporated into either the Grand Ronde or Siletz Communities.
4.	Chaftan	Chafan Band of the Kalapuya	Kalapooian	Confederated Tribes of the Grand Ronde Community	1983 as part of the Grand Ronde Confederation	1983 as part of the Grand Ronde Confederation	There were no members of this tribe enumerated on the 1890 census.
5.	Chempho	Muddy Creek Chemapho Band of the Central Kalapuya	Kalapooian	Confederated Tribes of the Grand Ronde Community	1983 as part of the Grand Ronde Confederation	1983 as part of the Grand Ronde Confederation	
6.	Chetco	Chetco Indians	Athapascan	Confederated Tribes of Siletz Indians	1977 as part of the Siletz Confederation	1977 as part of the Siletz Confederation	
7.	Chetlessington	Chet-less-ing-ton Band of Tututni	Athapascan	Confederated Tribes of Siletz Indians	1977 as part of the Siletz Confederation	1977 as part of the Siletz Confederation	
8.	Chinook	Chinook Indian Nation	Chinookan	n/a	n/a	On January 3, 2001, the US Congress endorsed restoring the tribal status of 5 Tribes of the Chinook Indian Nation: the Wahkiakum, Lower Chinook and Willapa (in Washington State) as-well-as Cathlamet and Clatsop in Oregon; however, on July 5, 2002, the decision was reversed. An appeal is in process.	
9.	Clackamas	Clackamas Tribe	Chinookan	Confederated Tribes of the Grand Ronde Community	1983 as part of the Grand Ronde Confederation	1983 as part of the Grand Ronde Confederation	
10.	Clatskanie	Clatskanie (Tlatskanai) Indians	Athapascan	Shasta Costa (Shastao-Skoton, Shista-Kkhwusta)Band of Tututni	1977 as part of the Siletz Confederation and/or 1983 as Grand Ronde Confederation	1977 as part of the Siletz Confederation and/or 1983 as Grand Ronde Confederation	The Clatskanie people merged with the Shasta Costa and in 1910, had only 3 remaining members.
11.	Clatsop	Clatsop Band of Chinook Indian Nation	Chinookan	n/a	n/a	n/a	On January 3, 2001, the US Congress endorsed restoring the tribal status of 5 Tribes of the Chinook Indian Nation: the Wahkiakum, Lower Chinook and Willapa (in Washington State) as-well-as Cathlamet and Clatsop in Oregon; however, on July 5, 2002, the decision was reversed. An appeal is in process.
12.	Clowwewalla	[]	Chinookan	Confederated Tribes of Siletz Indians	1977 as part of the Siletz Confederation	1977 as part of the Siletz Confederation	
13.	Confederated Tribes of the Grand Ronde Community	Confederated Tribes of the Grand Ronde Community	Chinookan	n/a	November 22, 1983	November 22, 1983	By federal statute. Public Law No. 98-165, 97 Stat. 1064 Upon restoration 10,678.36 acres of land were placed back into trust by the Bureau of Land management.
14.	Confederated Tribes of Siletz Indians	Confederated Tribes of Siletz Indians	various	n/a	November 18, 1977	November 18, 1977	By federal statute. Public Law No. 95-195, 91 Stat. 1415 Records of the Bureau of Land Management confirm that upon restoration 4,250.68 acres of land were re-established in the federal trust.
15.	Coos	Coos/Kusa peoples	Kusan	Confederated Tribes of Siletz Indians	1977 as part of the Siletz Confederation	1977 as part of the Siletz Confederation	
15.	Coos	Coos/Kusa peoples	Kusan	Confederated Tribes of Coos, Lower Umpqua and Siuslaw Indians	October 17, 1984	October 17, 1984	By federal statute. Public Law No. 98-481, 98 Stat. 2250 130.50 acres were placed into the Bureau of Land Management's trust upon tribal restoration.
16.	Cow Creek	Cow Creek Band of Umpqua Tribe of Indians	Athapascan	Confederated Tribes of the Grand Ronde Community	1983 as part of the Grand Ronde Confederation	1983 as part of the Grand Ronde Confederation	
16.	Cow Creek	Cow Creek Band of Umpqua Tribe of Indians	Athapascan	Cow Creek Band of Umpqua Tribe of Indians	December 29, 1982		By federal statute. Public Law No. Public Law 97-391 96 Stat. 1960
17.	Euchees	Euchre (Yukwitche, Yugweechi) Band of Tututni	Athapascan	Confederated Tribes of Siletz Indians	1977 as part of the Siletz Confederation	1977 as part of the Siletz Confederation	
18.	Galic Creek	Galice Creek Indians	Athapascan	Confederated Tribes of Siletz Indians	1977 as part of the Siletz Confederation	1977 as part of the Siletz Confederation	
19.	Grave	Grave Creek Umpqua	Athapascan	Confederated Tribes of the Grand Ronde Community	1983 as part of the Grand Ronde Confederation	1983 as part of the Grand Ronde Confederation	
20.	Joshua	Joshua or Chemetunne Band of the Tututni	Athapascan	Confederated Tribes of Siletz Indians	1977 as part of the Siletz Confederation	1977 as part of the Siletz Confederation	
21.	Karok	Karok Tribe	Hokan				As of the 1930 census, there were no Karok peoples enumerated living outside the State of California.
22.	Kathlamet	Cathlamet Band of Chinook Indian Nation	Chinookan	n/a	n/a	On January 3, 2001, the US Congress endorsed restoring the tribal status of 5 Tribes of the Chinook Indian Nation: the Wahkiakum, Lower Chinook and Willapa (in Washington State) as-well-as Cathlamet and Clatsop in Oregon; however, on July 5, 2002, the decision was reversed. An appeal is in process.	
23.	Kusotony	Kusotony Band of the Tututni	Athapascan	Confederated Tribes of Siletz Indians	1977 as part of the Siletz Confederation	1977 as part of the Siletz Confederation	Kusotony, Co-sutt-hen-ton, Co-ca-to-ny, Co-sate-he-ne all appear as variations of this name. An 1854 memo lists that the group, which had 27 members at that time was part of the "ToToTin" (clearly Tututni) Indians.
24.	Kwatami or Sixes	Kwatami or Sixes Band of Tututni	Athapascan	Confederated Tribes of Siletz Indians	1977 as part of the Siletz Confederation	1977 as part of the Siletz Confederation	
25.	Lakmiut	Luckiamute Band of Central Kalapuya	Kalapooian	Confederated Tribes of the Grand Ronde Community	1983 as part of the Grand Ronde Confederation	1983 as part of the Grand Ronde Confederation	
26.	Long Tom Creek	Long Tom Creek Band of the Kalapuya	Kalapooian	Confederated Tribes of the Grand Ronde Community	1983 as part of the Grand Ronde Confederation	1983 as part of the Grand Ronde Confederation	
27.	Lower Coquille	Lower Coquille (Ko-Kwell) of the Tututni	Athapascan	Confederated Tribes of Siletz Indians	1977 as part of the Siletz Confederation	1977 as part of the Siletz Confederation	
27.	Lower Coquille	Lower Coquille (Ko-Kwell) of the Tututni	Athapascan	Coquille Indian Tribe	June 28, 1989	June 28, 1989	By Federal Statute. Public Law 101-42. The Bureau of Land Management placed 6,481.95 acres of land into trust for the tribe upon restoration.
28.	Lower Umpqua	Lower Umpqua	Athapascan	Confederated Tribes of Siletz Indians	1977 as part of the Siletz Confederation	1977 as part of the Siletz Confederation	
28.	Lower Umpqua	Lower Umpqua	Athapascan	Confederated Tribes of Coos, Lower Umpqua and Siuslaw Indians	October 17, 1984	October 17, 1984	By federal statute. Public Law No. 98-481, 98 Stat. 2250 130.50 acres were placed into the Bureau of Land Management's trust upon tribal restoration.
29.	Maddy	Maddy or Chemapho Band of the Central Kalapuya	Kalapooian	Confederated Tribes of the Grand Ronde Community	1983 as part of the Grand Ronde Confederation	1983 as part of the Grand Ronde Confederation	
30.	Mackanotin	Mikonotunne Band of the Tututni	Athapascan	Confederated Tribes of Siletz Indians	1977 as part of the Siletz Confederation	1977 as part of the Siletz Confederation	
31.	Mary's River	Mary's River Chepenefa Band of Kalapuya	Kalapooian	Confederated Tribes of the Grand Ronde Community	1983 as part of the Grand Ronde Confederation	1983 as part of the Grand Ronde Confederation	
32.	Multnomah	Multnomah Band of the Chinook Indian Nation	Chinookan	Confederated Tribes of Siletz Indians	1977 as part of the Siletz Confederation	1977 as part of the Siletz Confederation	
33.	Munsel Creek	Munsel Creek Band	unknown				The band or sub-tribe was probably located near present Florence, Oregon, which is in Siuslaw country.
34.	Naltunnetunne	Naltunnetunne Band of the Tututni	Athapascan	Confederated Tribes of Siletz Indians	1977 as part of the Siletz Confederation	1977 as part of the Siletz Confederation	
35.	Nehalem	Nehalem or Tillamook Tribe	Coast Salish	Confederated Tribes of Siletz Indians	1977 as part of the Siletz Confederation	1977 as part of the Siletz Confederation	
36.	Nestucca	Nestucca	Coast Salish	Confederated Tribes of the Grand Ronde Community and Confederated Tribes of Siletz Indians	1977 as part of the Siletz Confederation and/or 1983 as Grand Ronde Confederation	1977 as part of the Siletz Confederation and/or 1983 as Grand Ronde Confederation	The 1890 census indicates that the Nestucca were residing on the Grand Ronde Reservation and the Nostucca were residing on the Siletz Reservation.
37.	Northern Molalla	Northern Molalla Band of the Plateau Indians	Waiilatpuan	Confederated Tribes of the Grand Ronde Community and Confederated Tribes of Siletz Indians	1983 as part of the Grand Ronde Confederation	1983 as part of the Grand Ronde Confederation	
38.	Port Orford	Naltunnetunne Band of the Tututni	Athapascan	Confederated Tribes of Siletz Indians	1977 as part of the Siletz Confederation	1977 as part of the Siletz Confederation	The 1890 census states that the Nahltanadons live in Port Orford; however, in the enumeration portion, the closest tribe listed to this spelling is Nultuatana.
39.	Pudding	Pudding River Ahantchuyuk Band of Kalapuya	Kalapooian	Confederated Tribes of the Grand Ronde Community	1983 as part of the Grand Ronde Confederation	1983 as part of the Grand Ronde Confederation	
40.	River Tribe						Smith River tribe merged with Siletz, but impossible to determine without more quantifiers what "river" refers to.
41.	Rogue River	Rogue River Band of Tututni	Athapascan	Confederated Tribes of the Grand Ronde Community and Confederated Tribes of Siletz Indians	1977 as part of the Siletz Confederation and/or 1983 as Grand Ronde Confederation	1977 as part of the Siletz Confederation and/or 1983 as Grand Ronde Confederation	Various bands of this group were incorporated into either the Grand Ronde or Siletz Communities. Rogue River appears on both the Grand Ronde and Siletz census for 1890.
42.	Salmon River	Salmon River Band of Salish	Coast Salish	Confederated Tribes of the Grand Ronde Community and Confederated Tribes of Siletz Indians	1977 as part of the Siletz Confederation and/or 1983 as Grand Ronde Confederation	1977 as part of the Siletz Confederation and/or 1983 as Grand Ronde Confederation	
43.	Santiam	Santiam Band of Kalapuya	Kalapooian	Confederated Tribes of the Grand Ronde Community	1983 as part of the Grand Ronde Confederation	1983 as part of the Grand Ronde Confederation	
44.	Scoton	Shasta Costa Band of Tututni	Athapascan	Confederated Tribes of Siletz Indians	1977 as part of the Siletz Confederation	1977 as part of the Siletz Confederation	Chasta-Scotons, Chasta Costas, Shis-ta-koos- tee, Shasta Coazta, Shasta Costa, Chaste Costa, Shasta Costa, ChasteCosta and Shista Kwusta all appear as variations of this name.
45.	Shasta	Shasta (Chasta) Band of the Tututni	Athapascan	Confederated Tribes of the Grand Ronde Community	1983 as part of the Grand Ronde Confederation	1983 as part of the Grand Ronde Confederation	
46.	Shasta Costa	Shasta Costa Band of Tututni	Athapascan	Confederated Tribes of the Grand Ronde Community and Confederated Tribes of Siletz Indians	1977 as part of the Siletz Confederation and/or 1983 as Grand Ronde Confederation	1977 as part of the Siletz Confederation and/or 1983 as Grand Ronde Confederation	Chasta-Scotons, Chasta Costas, Shis-ta-koos- tee, Shasta Coazta, Shasta Costa, Chaste Costa, Shasta Costa, ChasteCosta and Shista Kwusta all appear as variations of this name.
47.	Siletz	Siletz Band of the Tillamook Tribe	Coast Salish	Confederated Tribes of Siletz Indians	1977 as part of the Siletz Confederation	1977 as part of the Siletz Confederation	
48.	Siuslaw	Siuslaw Indians	Athapascan	Confederated Tribes of Siletz Indians	1977 as part of the Siletz Confederation	1977 as part of the Siletz Confederation	
48.	Siuslaw	Siuslaw Indians	Athapascan	Confederated Tribes of Coos, Lower Umpqua and Siuslaw Indians	October 17, 1984	October 17, 1984	By federal statute. Public Law No. 98-481, 98 Stat. 2250 130.50 acres were placed into the Bureau of Land Management's trust upon tribal restoration.
49.	Skiloot		Chinookan	Confederated Tribes of Siletz Indians	1977 as part of the Siletz Confederation	1977 as part of the Siletz Confederation	
50.	Southern Molalla	Southern Molalla Band of the Plateau Indians	Waiilatpuan	Confederated Tribes of the Grand Ronde Community and Confederated Tribes of Siletz Indians	1983 as part of the Grand Ronde Confederation	1983 as part of the Grand Ronde Confederation	
51.	Takelma	Takelma Band of the Tututni	Athapascan	Confederated Tribes of Siletz Indians	1977 as part of the Siletz Confederation	1977 as part of the Siletz Confederation	
52.	Tillamook	Tillamook Indian Tribe	Coast Salish	Confederated Tribes of the Grand Ronde Community and Confederated Tribes of the Siletz	1977 as part of the Siletz Confederation and/or 1983 as Grand Ronde Confederation	1977 as part of the Siletz Confederation and/or 1983 as Grand Ronde Confederation	
53.	Tolowa	Tolowa Indians	Athapascan	Confederated Tribes of Siletz Indians	1977 as part of the Siletz Confederation	1977 as part of the Siletz Confederation	
54.	Tualatin	Atfalati or Tualatin Band of Kalapuya	Kalapooian	Confederated Tribes of the Grand Ronde Community	1983 as part of the Grand Ronde Confederation	1983 as part of the Grand Ronde Confederation	
55.	Tututui	Tututni Indians	Athapascan	Confederated Tribes of the Grand Ronde Community and Confederated Tribes of Siletz Indians	1977 as part of the Siletz Confederation and/or 1983 as Grand Ronde Confederation	1977 as part of the Siletz Confederation and/or 1983 as Grand Ronde Confederation	Various bands of this group were incorporated into either the Grand Ronde or Siletz Communities.
56.	Upper Coquille	Upper Coquille Band of the Tututni	Athapascan	Confederated Tribes of Siletz Indians	1977 as part of the Siletz Confederation	1977 as part of the Siletz Confederation	
56.	Upper Coquille	Upper Coquille Band of the Tututni	Athapascan	Coquille Indian Tribe	June 28, 1989	June 28, 1989	By Federal Statute. Public Law 101-42. The Bureau of Land Management placed 6,481.95 acres of land into trust for the tribe upon restoration.
57.	Upper Umpqua	Upper Umpqua Band	Athapascan	Confederated Tribes of the Grand Ronde Community and Confederated Tribes of Siletz Indians	1977 as part of the Siletz Confederation and/or 1983 as Grand Ronde Confederation	1977 as part of the Siletz Confederation and/or 1983 as Grand Ronde Confederation	
58.	Willamette Tumwater	Willamette Tumwater Band of the Chinook Indian Nation	Chinookan	Confederated Tribes of the Grand Ronde Community	1983 as part of the Grand Ronde Confederation	1983 as part of the Grand Ronde Confederation	
59.	Yamhill	Yamhill Band of Kalapuya	Kalapooian	Confederated Tribes of the Grand Ronde Community	1983 as part of the Grand Ronde Confederation	1983 as part of the Grand Ronde Confederation	
60.	Yaquina	Yaquina Tribe	Yakonan	Confederated Tribes of Siletz Indians	1977 as part of the Siletz Confederation	1977 as part of the Siletz Confederation	By the time the Coast Reservation of 1856 was established, the population of the Yaquina Tribe was so reduced that the entire record of the Yakonan/Alsean language stock comes from the Alsea. The reservation was established in the traditional homeland of the Yaquina and Alsea and encompassed their homelands. Comments in the 1930 US Federal Census state, "The report of the Office of Indian Affairs for 1932 shows 13 Alsea and Yaquina enrolled at the Siletz Reservation of whom 5 are residing there and 8 elsewhere." It also indicates that the 1910 Census showed 29 Alsea, 7 Siuslaw, and 19 Yaquina living in Oregon.
61.	Yoncalla	Yoncalla Band of the Kalapuya	Kalapooian	Confederated Tribes of the Grand Ronde Community	1983 as part of the Grand Ronde Confederation	1983 as part of the Grand Ronde Confederation	

== See also ==
- California Rancheria Termination Act
