= Oregon Penutian languages =

Hypothetical Native American language family

Oregon Penutian
- (hypothetical / obsolete)
- Geographic distribution: Oregon
- Linguistic classification: Penutian: Oregon Penutian
- Subdivisions: Kalapuyan; Takelma; Coast Oregon

Language codes
- Glottolog: None

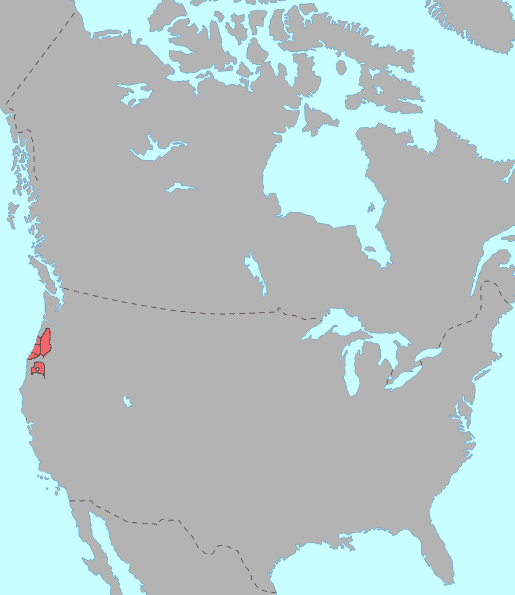
Theoretical spread of Oregon Penutian

Oregon Penutian is a hypothetical language family in the Penutian language phylum comprising languages spoken at one time by several groups of Native Americans in present-day western Oregon and western Washington in the United States. Various languages in the family are divided by dialects that are in most cases identical to the various identified tribal bands in the region.

The languages were spoken largely along both banks of the lower and middle Columbia River, in the Willamette Valley, in the Oregon Cascade Range, along the Oregon Coast, and in the valleys of the Umpqua and Rogue rivers. The area in which the languages were spoken includes the most populated areas of Oregon today.

Languages in the Oregon Penutian family are:

- Kalapuyan
- Takelma
- Coast Oregon group
  - Alsean
  - Siuslaw
  - Coosan

Recent internal classifications of Penutian, such as that of Scott DeLancey, have abandoned Oregon Penutian, while retaining the Coast Oregon Penutian family.
