= Coquille Indian Tribe =

Native American tribe in Oregon, United States

Regions with significant populations
- Coos County, Oregon

Languages
- Miluk, Upper Coquille (Nuu-wee-ya)

Related ethnic groups
- Lower Rogue River Athabascan

The Coquille Indian Tribe (/ˈkoʊkwɛl/ KOH-kwel) is the federally recognized Native American tribe of the Coquille people who have traditionally lived on the southern Oregon Coast.

Location of Coquille Indian Reservation

== History ==
=== Pre-contact through the mid-19th century ===
Beginning in 1847, following the Cayuse Indian slaughter of the white, Presbyterian missionaries at the "Whitman Mission", a series of retaliatory attacks ensued against the indigenous peoples all throughout the Oregon Territory, perpetrated by both miners and settlers. By 1854, several dozen miners who were angry over an altercation with a native man, went into the Coquille Indian village in what is now Bandon, Oregon, and killed all the members of that tribe that they could find there, burning their houses and slaughtering all women and children.

=== Treaty with the United States ===
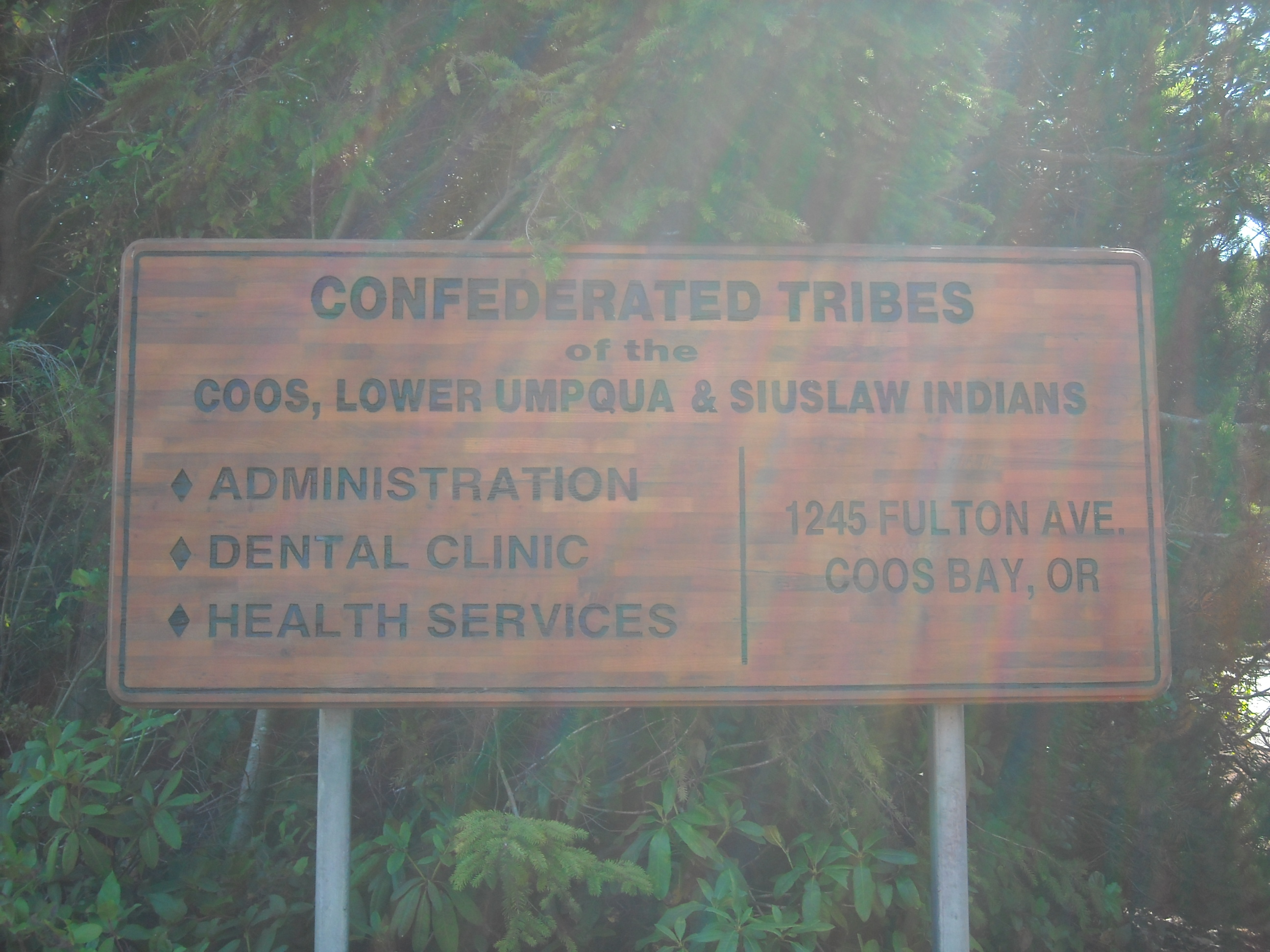
Sign of The Confederated Tribes

In 1855, Joel Palmer, Oregon Superintendent of Indian Affairs, negotiated a treaty with the Coquille and surrounding tribes that set aside 125 miles (201 km) of coastline extending from the Siltcoos River to Cape Lookout to form the Coastal (or Siletz) Indian Reservation near present-day Florence. The Coquille people were forcibly marched to the reservation in 1856; however, the treaty was never ratified by Congress. Disease and overcrowding were problems on the reservation, which was eventually reduced to a fraction of its former size. The remnants of the original Coastal Indian Reservation are contained in the Siletz Reservation and associated tribally owned lands. Over the years many Coquilles returned to their traditional homeland and fought for acknowledgement of the Treaty of 1855.

=== Termination and restoration ===
The U.S. federal government terminated its recognition of the Coquille as part of the Western Oregon Indian Termination Act. In 1989 the tribe regained its federal recognition. With restoration came tribal sovereignty, which gives the tribe authority to form its own government and have jurisdiction over tribal lands, businesses, and community members.

The Coquille Tribe opened The Mill Casino on May 19, 1995, at a former waterfront plywood mill between North Bend and Coos Bay. The mill had been built in 1961 by Weyerhauser and closed in 1991; it was sold to the tribe for $7 million. The site was criticized by the Confederated Tribes of Coos, Lower Umpqua and Siuslaw Indians, who claimed that the Coquille's ancestral lands did not include Coos Bay and its siting would unfairly compete with their smaller casino. The casino project was developed by the Coquille Economic Development Corporation (Cedco), led by businessman and former NFL football player Bruce Anderson. Anderson was later found to have used federal funds earmarked for tribal housing to pay for personal expenses and his own home. He was indicted by a federal grand jury in 1999 of illegal dumping of asbestos from the casino's construction.

== Name origin ==
According to the Tribe's website, the name comes from a native word for lamprey, a staple food for the tribe. European settlers approximated the word as KOH-kwel but it came to be spelled Coquille (the French word for shell). Eventually the pronunciation of the town and river shifted to koh-KEEL, but the tribe's name retained the older pronunciation.

== Coquille Indian Reservation ==
Map of the Coquille Reservation with neighbouring reservations (In red)

The Confederated Tribes of Siletz, based in Siletz, Oregon, recognize the Coquille people as one of the tribes that make up their confederation. The Confederated Tribes of Siletz continue to live on the Siletz Indian Reservation. In addition, by an Act of Congress in 1996, the Coquille Tribe now has reservation area totaling 6,512 acres (26 km^{2}). The reservation's lands are located in numerous non-contiguous parcels of land in southern Coos County, mostly in and to the southeast of the Coos Bay-North Bend urban area. Parts of the communities of Bandon, Barview, Coos Bay, and North Bend extend onto reservation lands. The 2000 census listed the reservation's official resident population as 258 people.

=== Forest management ===
The "Oregon Resources Conservation Act of 1996" (part of Public Law 104-208) restored to the Coquille Tribe approximately 5,400 acres (2,200 ha) of forest in Coos County, Oregon. The act's author, Oregon Senator Mark Hatfield, said of the Coquille Forest: "I hope this proposal, with its relatively modest acreage and the required adherence to the most environmentally friendly forest management plan ever implemented in the Pacific Northwest—President Clinton's forest plan—is successful and can become a model for how our Nation deals with other claims by native American tribes." The Forest was formally taken into trust for the Tribe by the U.S. government on September 30, 1998. The Coquille Forest comprises fourteen separate parcels of former BLM timberlands in eastern Coos County.

Unlike other forests held in trust for and managed by federally recognized tribes, under the National Indian Forest Resources Management Act, the Coquille Forest has the additional requirement of meeting the "standards and guidelines" of adjacent federal forests, such as the Northwest Forest Plan. While most federal forests have not met their timber production expectations under the Northwest Forest Plan, the Coquille Forest is widely considered the only entity to meet both the ecological and economic outputs of the Northwest Forest Plan.

In 2011, the U.S. Secretary of Interior endorsed the first component of the landscape management proposal in which the Coquille Indian Tribe and the BLM would work together to develop a demonstration timber sale pilot in coordination with professors Norm Johnson and Jerry Franklin. This pilot will demonstrate the professors' ecological principles of variable retention regeneration harvest in the Oregon Coast Range. The timber sale will be designed under the Northwest Forest Plan and comply with all BLM requirements.

Management of the Coquille Forest has earned recognition for being environmentally sound and sustainable. The Forest Stewardship Council certified the Coquille Forest in September 2011.

== Government ==
The tribal government is based in Coos Bay.

In 2008 the tribe legalized same-sex marriage, becoming the first tribal nation in the United States to do so. Although the Oregon voters approved an amendment to the Oregon Constitution in 2004 to prohibit such marriages, the Coquille are not bound by the Oregon Constitution, because they are a federally recognized sovereign nation.

The Coquille Indian Tribe Library contains information on the Coquille Indian Tribe and other Tribes of southwest Oregon including the Confederated Tribes of Coos, Lower Umpqua, and Siuslaw Indians.

Policing is handled by the Coquille Tribal police force.

== Economy ==
The Coquille Tribe owns several businesses, including the Ko-Kwel Casino Resort in North Bend, and ORCA Communications, a telecommunications provider.

In September 2012, the tribe announced plans for a casino in Medford, to be built in a bowling alley that was acquired for $1.6 million. It opened in 2025. The tribe is also leasing an adjacent golf course.

The tribe offers essential healthcare services to Native American and non-Native American patients alike at their Ko-Kwel Wellness clinics in Coos Bay and Eugene.

== See also ==
- Coos Bay Wagon Road Lands
- List of Native American Tribal Entities in Oregon
