= Confederated Tribes =

Confederated Tribes may refer to a number of associations of Indigenous peoples in the American part of the Pacific Northwest:

- Confederated Tribes of the Chehalis Reservation
- Confederated Tribes of the Colville Reservation
- Confederated Tribes of Coos, Lower Umpqua and Siuslaw Indians
- Confederated Tribes of the Grand Ronde Community of Oregon
- Confederated Salish and Kootenai Tribes of the Flathead Nation
- Confederated Tribes of Siletz Indians
- Confederated Tribes of the Umatilla Indian Reservation
- Confederated Tribes of Warm Springs
- Confederated Tribes and Bands of the Yakama Nation
