= Siuslaw =

Siuslaw may refer to:

- Siuslaw people, Native American tribe and the Siuslaw language they spoke
- Siuslaw River, a river named for the tribe
- Siuslaw River Bridge, a bridge named for the river it spans
- Siuslaw National Forest, a forest named for the river
