= Coquelle Thompson =

Coquelle Thompson (ca. 1848–1946) was a Coquille Indian from the U.S. state of Oregon who was a cultural and linguistic consultant to at least six important anthropologists over the course of his long life. Born the son of a chief of the Upper Coquille Indians, and his Hanis Coos wife, he was among the several hundred Indians from southwestern Oregon who were removed by ship from Port Orford to the Coast or Siletz Indian Reservation in June 1856. His is an Indian eye-witness account of that removal. He grew up and lived on the Siletz Reservation, serving for decades as a member of the tribal police force.

In 1873, Coquelle Thompson attended a version of the Ghost Dance of 1870 held at Corvallis, Oregon, and later he attended a dance of the Warm House at Upper Farm, Siletz Reservation. He soon became a convert to a version of the Ghost Dance known at Siletz as the Warm House Dance, and proselytized along the Oregon Coast as far south as Coos Bay. His version became known as the Thompson Warm House Dance.

He was married three times and had eleven children, all of whom died before adulthood except two, who married and have descendants to the present day among the Confederated Tribes of Siletz Indians.
