= Government Hill (disambiguation) =

Government Hill is a hill in Central, Hong Kong.

Government Hill may also refer to:

- Government Hill, Anchorage, Alaska, United States
- Siletz Agency Site, a historic site and park in Oregon, United States
- Government Hill, a neighborhood in Central El Paso, Texas, United States
- Fort Canning Hill, formerly known as the Government Hill, Singapore from 1824 to 1861
