= Confederated Tribes of Siletz Indians =

Indian tribe of Washington, Oregon, and California, United States

Total population
- 5,600 (2020)

Regions with significant populations
- United States (Oregon)

Languages
- English

Related ethnic groups
- Athabaskan peoples, southern Interior Salish peoples

The Confederated Tribes of Siletz Indians in the United States is a federally recognized confederation of more than 27 Native American tribes and bands who once inhabited an extensive homeland of more than 20 million acres from northern California to southwest Washington and between the summit of the Cascades and the Pacific Ocean. After the Rogue River Wars, these tribes were removed to the Coast Indian Reservation, now known as the Siletz Reservation. The tribes spoke at least 11 distinct languages, including Tillamook, Shasta, Lower Chinook, Kalapuya, Takelma, Alsea-Yaquina, Siuslaw/Lower Umpqua, Coos, the Plateau Penutian languages Molala and Klickitat, and several related Oregon Athabaskan languages.

== Name ==
The confederation takes its name from the Siletz River, which surrounds the original headquarters of the reservation. The word siletz translates to a description of something that is coiled like a rope or a snake, describing the route of the river winding through the mountains circuitously to the ocean. The confederation includes remnants of the Siletz, a Coast Salish people who also became incorporated into the larger confederation.

== Tribes ==
The confederation is made up of the following tribes and bands.

- Tillamook
  - Siletz
  - Salmon River/Neachesna
  - Nestucca
  - Nehalem
  - Tillamook Bay
- Alsea, including Yaquina
- Chinook, including Wakhiakum, Multnomah, and Clatsop
- Coos, including Hanis and Miluk
- Kalapuya, including Santiam, Tualatin, Yamhill, Yoncalla, Marys River band, and others
- Lower Umpqua (also known as Kuitsh) and Siuslaw
- Molalla
- Shasta, including Klamath River people
- Rogue River peoples, including Shasta, Upper Rogue River Athapaskan peoples: Applegate and Galice Creek, or any of the tribes of Lower Rogue River Athapaskan (or Tututni) people
- Klickitat
- Takelma, including Dagelma, Latgawa, and Cow Creek
- Oregon Athabaskans, including all Athabaskan bands from southwestern Oregon (bands of Rogue River Athabaskan peoples, Chetco people, Tolowa people and Upper Umpqua (Etnemitane) people), such as the following:
  - Lower Rogue River Athabaskan (also known as Tututni) peoples
    - Upper Coquille (also known as Mishikwutinetunne)
    - Chasta Costa
    - Tututni
      - Euchre Creek (also known as Yukichetunne)
      - Flores Creek
      - Mikonotunne
      - Naltunnetunne
      - Pistol River (also known as Chetleshin)
      - Port Orford band of Kwatami (also known as Kaltsergheatunne)
      - Sixes (also known as Kwatami)
      - Yashute (also known as Chemetunne) and others
  - Upper Rogue River Athabaskan (also known as Galice/Applegate) peoples
    - Applegate River (also known as Dakubetede)
    - Galice Creek (also known as Taltushtuntede)
  - Chetco-Tolowa
    - Tolowa
    - Chetco
  - Upper Umpqua (also known as Etnemitane)

== History ==
The Confederated Tribes emerged from the remnants of around 28 different tribes of coastal and other Western Oregon Indians.

=== Interim-reservations ===
- Table Rock Indian Reservation

=== After the war of 1855–1856 ===
After the Rogue River Wars of 1855–56, most of the peoples were forced onto the Coast Indian Reservation, which later became known as the Siletz Reservation, where they were to form a single unified tribe. The Coast Reservation originally comprised 1.1 million acres, which was established by the executive order of President Franklin Pierce on November 9, 1855, only weeks after the start of the last phase of the Rogue River Wars. The Siletz Reservation was reduced by around 3/4 its area (approximately 900,000 acres) in 1865 and 1875 in violation of treaties. In 1894, 551 individuals received federal allotments from the remaining reservation, and tribal members were forced to cede the "surplus" for 74 cents an acre. By 1912, restrictions on inheriting lands within families led to more than one half of the Siletz allotments being owned by non-Indians.

=== Termination act of 1954 ===
The Western Oregon Indian Termination Act of 1954, Public Law 588, was passed into law on August 13, 1954. This new law severed Bureau of Indian Affairs (BIA) supervision of trust lands and BIA regulation of services to the Indian peoples.

All of the remaining Siletz lands were sold except for the 39 acres called Government Hill. The proceeds of the sale of the timberland property were distributed to enrolled tribal members in two installments: $250 per person in December 1954, and a final payment of $542.50 per person in August 1956. Other inherited allotments were held in trusts but were also sold off at the request of the owners.

=== Restoration bills ===
During the 1960s, several members of the Siletz tribe began to organize and restore common bonds. Their initiatives included the restoration of the tribal cemetery on Government Hill and aggressive lobbying of Congress and the office of the President to again recognize Siletz as a federal Native American tribe.

In June 1974, Rep. Wendell Wyatt introduced a first restoration bill, but it did not pass.

On December 17, 1975, Senator Mark Hatfield introduced restoration bill S. 2801. At the time Senator Hatfield presented his restoration bill he was quoted as saying that the Siletz People were "ill-prepared to cope with the realities of American society" when the Termination act went to effect and that they had been "tossed abruptly from a state of almost total dependency to a state of total independence ...[forcing them] to leave the only way of life they had known." The bill included wording to grant or restore hunting and fishing rights. This bill also did not pass.

Senator Hatfield and Senator Bob Packwood introduced a new bill, S. 1560, in the month of May 1977. Unlike its 1975 predecessor, it did not include that the hunting or fishing rights be restored (although a companion bill was sent by Rep. Les AuCoin to the United States House of Representatives, H.R. 7259, which the Oregon Fish and Wildlife Commission fought and helped to stall). On August 5, 1977, the United States Senate passed the restoration bill and on November 1, 1977, so did the House. The bill was then sent to President Jimmy Carter on November 3 and then signed into law on November 18, 1977.

Today about 5,600 of their descendants are enrolled members of this tribe, which is based on the Siletz Reservation along the Siletz River in the Central Oregon Coast Range, about 15 miles northeast of Newport, Oregon.

=== Important events in tribal history ===
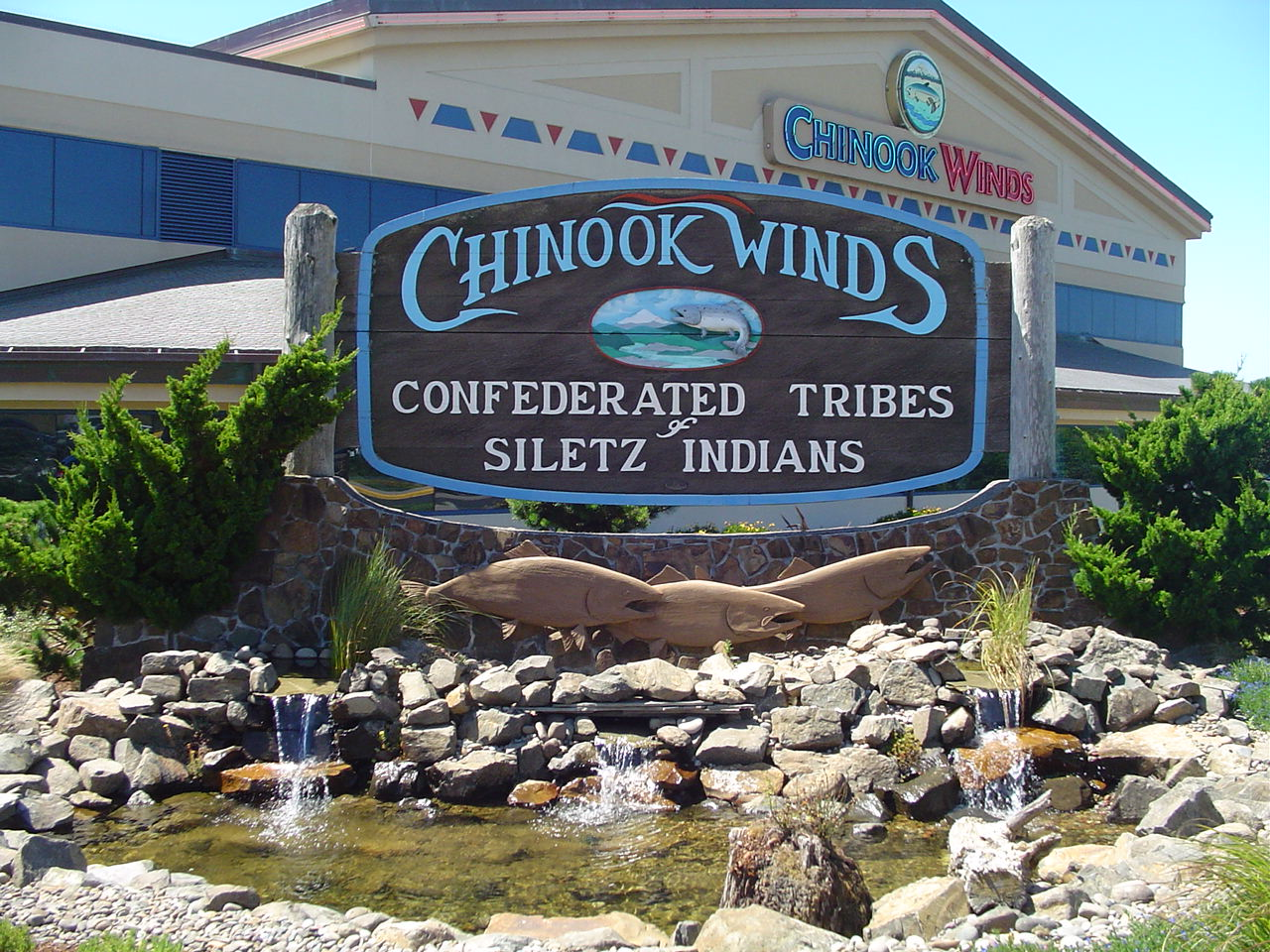
A sign in front of Logan Road, owned by the Confederated Tribes of the Siletz Indians

- On November 18, 1977, the Confederated Tribes became the second tribe in the U.S. to have its federal status restored, and returned to being a sovereign government.
- On June 2, 1979, tribal members adopted a constitution.
- On November 1, 1979, people of the town of Siletz, voted 148 to 134 to give back to the tribe approximately 36 acres (150,000 m^{2}) of former tribal land, which was originally the site of the old Siletz Agency, "Government Hill". The tribe had given this land to the city at the time of termination.
- In 1980, the Siletz Reservation Act was signed into law, returning about 3,660 acres to the Siletz Tribe as its initial restored Siletz Reservation.
- In 1994, the Tribe voted to lower the blood quantum, to 1/16, which allowed new members to join.
- In 1995, the first "Run to the Rogue" took place, in which tribal members took turns carrying an eagle flag staff from Government Hill in Siletz to Agness, Oregon (located on the Rogue River) in what is Oregon's longest relay on foot.
- In 1995, the Siletz Tribe opened up a 157,000-square-foot (14,600 m^{2}) casino/convention center, called Chinook Winds Casino, which overlooks the Pacific Ocean from Lincoln City, Oregon.
- In 2005, a 227-room hotel adjacent to Chinook Winds Casino was purchased and added to the casino.
- December 6, 2016 S.817 Bill Passed in U.S. House of Representatives. Real Property located within the original Siletz Reservation boundaries lines is now deemed "on reservation."
- In 2024 after 40 years the Confederated Tribes of Siletz Indians regained their Hunting; fishing and gathering rights

== Organization and location ==
Map of the Siletz Reservation with neighbouring reservations (In green)

The Confederated Tribes have 5,600 enrolled members, 70% of whom live in Oregon and only 8% of whom live near on the 3,900-acre (16 km^{2}) reservation. An additional 6% live in the town of Siletz and 22.6% live in Lincoln County. There are 445 households in the city of Siletz and 143 households on the Siletz Reservation.

The tribe owns and manages about 16,000 acres total, about 4,000-acre (16 km^{2}) of which is a reservation located along the Siletz River in the Central Oregon Coast Range of central Lincoln County, Oregon, approximately 15 mi (24 km) northeast of Newport. In total, they own a checkerboard of approximately 15,000 acres (61 km^{2}) in and around the original 1.1 million acre Coast Indian Reservation, established Nov 9, 1855 – which was quickly whittled down, and the tribe terminated by act of Congress in 1956. The Confederated Tribes of Siletz Indians became the second tribe terminated by an act of Congress to regain federal recognition by passage of the Siletz Restoration Act Nov 18, 1977.

The tribe owns and operates the Chinook Winds Casino and Convention Center, the Chinook Winds Golf Resort in Lincoln City (including the Chinook Winds Resort hotel purchased from Shilo Inn hotels in 2004), the oceanfront Lot 57 north of Chinook Winds Casino, Hee Hee Illahee RV park in Salem, the Logan Road RV Park, the Salem Flex Building where the Salem Area Offices currently exist, the Portland Stark Building which was purchased in August 2007, which is the site of the tribe's Portland Area Office, the Eugene Elks building which houses the Eugene Area Office, the Siletz Gas & Mini Mart, the old Toledo Mill site, and a commercial building in Depoe Bay.

The tribe also owns and runs the Siletz Community Health Clinic. A $7.5 million plan is underway to expand the clinic. $2 million of the funding will come from the Federal government's IHS Small Ambulatory Grant funding. The clinic is currently 15,000 square feet (1,400 m^{2}) but will grow to 45,000 square feet (4,200 m^{2}) between 2006 and 2016.

The Siletz Tribal Police department was discontinued, but the tribe now contracts with the nearby Lincoln County Sheriff's Office to provide law enforcement services to the Siletz area.

The tribe is gradually accumulating additional property into the reservation, as part of its Comprehensive Plan. This includes 3,851 acres (15.58 km^{2}) entrusted to the tribe in 2007 by the state and federal governments as part of the New Carissa oil spill settlement, on the condition that the Confederated Tribes will manage it as a marbled murrelet habitat.

The tribal government is attempting to get its 1850s treaties with the United States recognized by referencing them in the tribe's constitution, and also by mentioning the treaties in a work by Charles Wilkinson, who was hired by the tribal council to write a history of the Siletz. There have also been attempts to retrieve the remains of tribal ancestors from the Smithsonian Institution, and to retrieve various other tribal artifacts distributed throughout the United States of America.

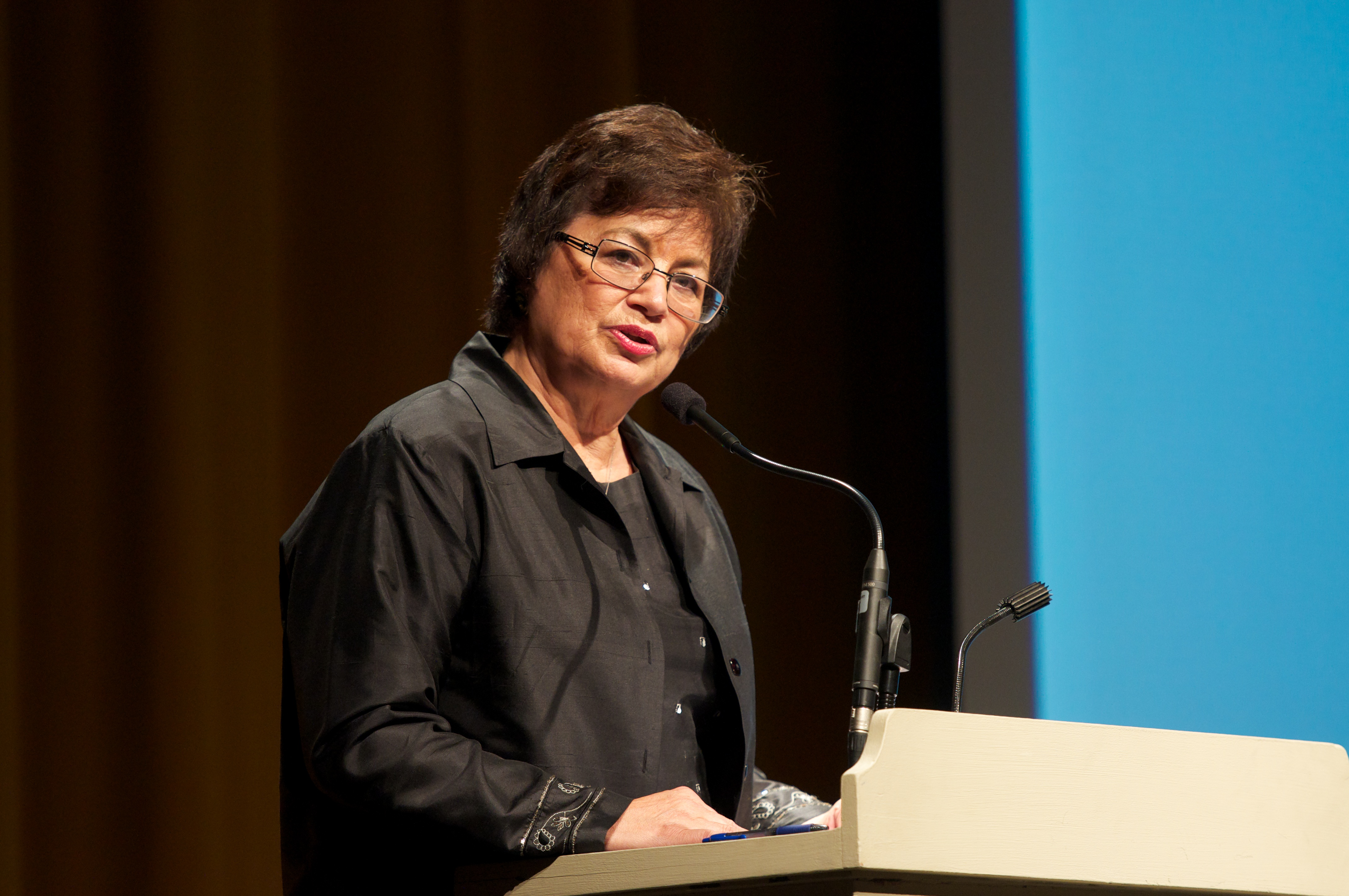
Tribal Council Chairman Delores Pigsley

The current Tribal Council includes Chairman Delores Pigsley, Vice Chairman Alfred "Bud" Lane III, Secretary Judy Muschamp, Treasurer Robert Kentta, Reggie Butler Jr., Gerald Ben, Loraine Butler, Alfred "Buddy" Lane IV, and Selene Rilatos.

The tribal government's Public Information Office publishes the monthly Siletz News.

== Cultural activities ==
Artifacts and historical documents are stored and displayed at the Siletz Tribal Cultural Center, located on Government Hill, under the care of Cultural Programs Staff.

Tolowa is taught as a common tribal language. Beginning Athabaskan language has been taught at the Siletz Valley Charter School, which opened in the fall of 2006.

The second weekend in August of every year the tribe is host to its annual Nesika Illahee Pow-wow.

Every summer and winter solstice for hundreds if not thousands of years, a dance has been held, called the Feather Dance (or Nee-dash), for 10 nights.

In recent years a new tradition has been started. During the winter solstice, dancers, singers, and tribal members from the Confederated Tribes visit the Tolowa's cedar plank dance house near Smith River, California. During the summer solstice, dancers, singers, and tribal members of the Tolowa tribe visit the peoples of the Confederated Tribes of Siletz's cedar plank dance house.

In 2025, a beached whale remains were salvaged by the tribe.

== Population ==
Finding records of the ethnic and cultural history of the Confederated Tribes of Siletz is somewhat difficult. A partial attempt at the tribal population makeup before it was forced on reservation lands in the mid-19th century is as follows:

- Upper Rogue River or Shasta Tribe:
  - John's Band 172
  - George's Band 222
  - Joseph James's Band 160
- Coastal Tribes:
  - Joshuas's Band 179
  - Choallie's Band 215
  - Totoem's Band 202
  - Macanotin's Band 129
  - Shasta Costa 110
  - Port Orford (a Qua-to-mah band) 242
  - Upper Coquille 313

== Language ==
The ancestors of the Confederated Tribes spoke at least 11 different languages.

- Salishan languages
  - Tillamook
- Shastan languages
  - Shasta
- Penutian languages (proposed grouping)
  - Chinookan languages
    - Lower Chinook
  - Kalapuyan languages
  - Takelma
  - Plateau Penutian languages
    - Sahaptian languages
      - Sahaptin (Klickitat dialect)
    - Molala
  - Coast Oregon Penutian languages (proposed)
    - Alsea
    - Siuslaw
    - Coosan languages
- Na-Dene languages
  - Athabaskan languages
    - Lower Rogue River (or Tututni)
    - Upper Rogue River (or Galice-Applegate)
    - Upper Umpqua (or Etnemitane)
    - Tolowa (or Siletz Dee-niʼ)

According to a report by the National Geographic Society and the Living Tongues Institute for Endangered Languages, Siletz Dee-ni is the last of many tribal languages spoken on the reservation. In 2007 only one living fluent speaker remained. However, according to a later report in The Economist, the language has since been at least partially revived thanks to an on-line dictionary project; in some areas, "many now text each other in Siletz Dee-ni." The tribe has a language revival program with classes in three area offices and Siletz Valley school. As of 2020, a number of younger conversant speakers have learned the language.

== Notable Siletz people ==
- Peter DePoe, drummer for the band Redbone
- Sister Francella Mary Griggs, advocate for the restoration of federal recognition
- Mary "Dolly" Fisher, activist to restore federal recognition of the Confederated Tribes of Siletz Indians from 1974. She won the Nanwood Honeyman Award for significant contribution to the advancement of women in Oregon. She won The National Congress of American Indians award, honoring Indian and Native Women's leadership. Named tribal casino as "Chinook Winds."
- Calvin Leroy Van Pelt (1924–2011), businessman and tribal elder
- Delores Ann (Lane) Pigsley, one of the longest serving Tribal leaders in the United States as of 2025, still serving as Siletz Tribal Chairman.

== See also ==
- List of Native American Tribal Entities in Oregon
