= Calvin Leroy Van Pelt =

Native American businessman

- Born: September 4, 1924; Alsea, Oregon
- Died: September 25, 2011 (aged 87)
- Citizenship: Confederated Tribes of Siletz Indians of Oregon and U.S.
- Occupation: businessman

Calvin Leroy Van Pelt (September 4, 1924 – September 25, 2011) was a businessman in the U.S. state of Oregon.

== Early life, military service, and education ==
Born in Alsea, Oregon, in 1924, he served in the U.S. Army during World War II and was among those who landed on Utah Beach as part of the Northern France, Ardennes and Rhineland Campaigns. After World War II, Van Pelt returned to Oregon, where he graduated from Pacific University in 1949 and subsequently from the Thunderbird Graduate School of International Management in 1950.

== Business career ==
He began his career as an export trainee with Jantzen, Inc. in Portland, Oregon, and eventually became manager of Jantzen's international division. Later, he held executive positions at Columbia Exporters, White Stag, Sea-Pac International, and Martin Sales International. He also worked more than 20 years to establish the World Trade Center in Portland and served several years as Honorary Consul to the Republic of South Africa.

== Volunteering ==
Van Pelt served on the Pacific University Alumni Board of Directors, as an Elder for the Confederated Tribes of Siletz Indians and several other community-based boards, foundations, and committees.

== Awards ==
In June 2007, Pacific University bestowed a Lifetime Achievement Award to Van Pelt and five other graduates. Van Pelt died on September 25, 2011, in Portland, Oregon.
