= Siletz Agency Site =

- U.S. National Register of Historic Places
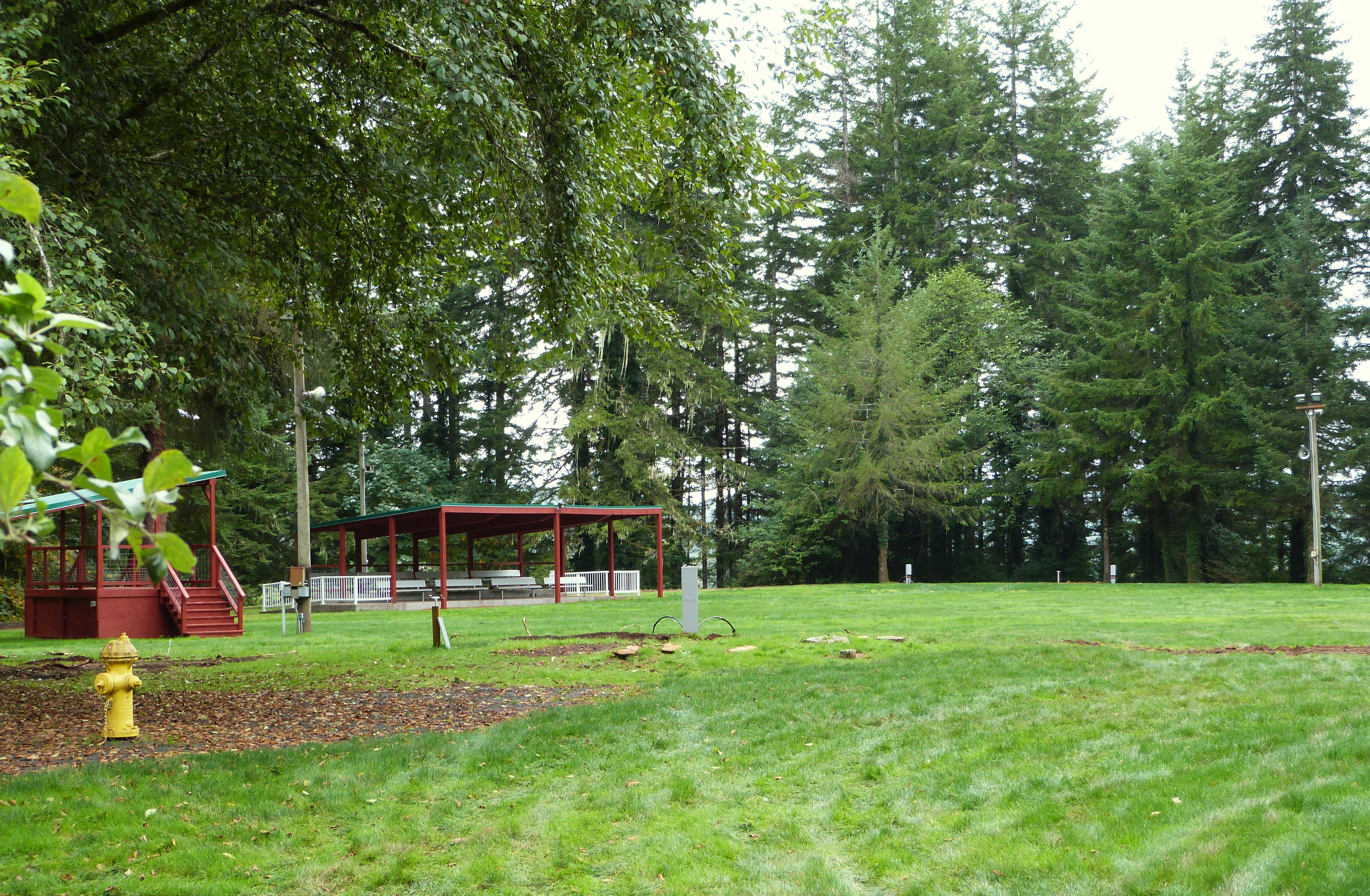
- Pow-wow grounds at the Siletz Agency Site in 2013.
- Location: Siletz–Logsden Road; Siletz, Oregon, United States
- Coordinates: 44°43′23″N 123°54′38″W
- Area: 36.55 acres (14.79 ha)
- Built: ca. 1856–1895
- NRHP reference No.: 76001582
- Added to NRHP: January 1, 1976

The Siletz Agency Site, also known as Government Hill, is a historic site and park located in Siletz, Oregon, United States. Beginning in 1855, U.S. Army forcibly relocated over 2,600 people of several different tribes to the Siletz Reservation. The U.S. government established an Indian agency at Siletz in 1857. Within 30 years, hardship had reduced the Indian numbers to approximately 600. By the time the agency closed in 1925, it had grown to include a blockhouse, boarding house, schoolhouse, barn, office building, several employee residences, hospital/meeting house, and cemetery, several of which have since been destroyed.

The site is the most important physical reminder of the tragic history of Indian affairs on the Oregon Coast, and remains a focal point for members of the Siletz tribes. The site was added to the National Register of Historic Places in 1976.

== See also ==
- National Register of Historic Places listings in Lincoln County, Oregon
