= Coquille people =

The Coquille (/ˈkoʊkwɛl/ KOH-kwel, sometimes spelled Ko-Kwel or Ko'Kwel) are a Native American people who historically lived in the Coquille River watershed and nearby coast south of Coos Bay. They were signatories of the Oregon Coast Tribes Treaty of 1855 and were subsequently removed to the Siletz Reservation in northwestern Oregon in 1856. Most Coquille people today live there as members of the Confederated Tribes of Siletz Indians, but some whose ancestors remained in the traditional homeland or fled the reservation now make up the Coquille Indian Tribe, centered in southwest Oregon where the Coos River flows into Coos Bay.

== Name ==
According to the Coquille Indian Tribe's website, the name comes from a native word for lamprey, a staple food for the tribe. European settlers approximated the word as KOH-kwel but it came to be spelled Coquille (the French word for shell). Eventually the pronunciation of the town and river shifted to koh-KEEL, but the tribe's name retained the older pronunciation.

== Groups ==
The Coquille are part Lower Coquille Miluk and part Lower Rogue River Athabascan “tribes,” Tututni which included the Coquille (Upper Coquille, Mishikwutinetunne) tribe, Shastacosta tribe and Tututni tribe (including Euchre Creek (Yukichetunne) band). Bands of Tututni tribe include the Kwatami, Tututunne, Mikonotunne, Chemetunne, Chetleshin, Kwaishtunnetunne, and Yukichetunne,

== Languages ==
The Coquille people historically spoke two languages, Miluk, a Coosan language, and the Upper Coquille dialect of Lower Rogue River, a Pacific Coast Athabaskan language classified as part of the Oregon Athabaskan subgroup. After relocation to the Siletz Reservation, Coquille people had to resort to communicating in Chinuk Wawa, the lingua franca on the reservation, which was composed of many languages foreign to each other in the 19th and early 20th centuries.

The Coquille Indian Tribe is involved in language revitalization efforts for both Miluk and Upper Coquille Athabaskan, and the Confederated Tribe of Siletz has a language program focused on Siletz Dee-ni, a loosely standardized variety of the Oregon Athabaskan language, which is a heritage language for many of the communities that make up Siletz.

== History ==
Human occupation of the coastal areas of the Coquille watershed dates back as far as 8,000 years, and 11,000 years in inland areas. Fish traps used on the lower Coquille River have been dated back at least 1,000 years. Extensive oral histories of the Coquille have been collected and preserved at the Coquille Indian Tribe Library in Coos Bay, Oregon.

The Coquille fished in the tidewaters and estuaries along the Oregon coastline using fishing weirs and basket traps, and collected shellfish. Some lived in lean-tos made of cedar planks, others constructed homes on wood-frame poles out of willow frames covered with sod or grass reeds.

Modern scholars have documented an extensive network of trails, footpaths, and canoe routes that the Coquille people had developed by the time of contact by the North West Company's Alexander McLeod in 1826.

=== Mid-19th century to the present ===
After the treaty of 1855, the Coquille people were forced to move to the Coastal Indian Reservation (now the Siletz Reservation). Today Coquille people may be part of one of two tribal entities: the Coquille Indian Tribe or the Confederated Tribes of the Siletz.

The Rogue River Athabascan tribes (including Coquille), Takelma, Latgawa and Shasta peoples were in 19th century collectively known as Rogue River Indians.

== See also ==
- Coquelle Thompson
- Coquille Indian Tribe
- Confederated Tribes of the Siletz
