= Francella Mary Griggs =

Sister Francella Mary Griggs, S.N.J.M., (February 5, 1920 – January 7, 2012) was a Native American member of the Sisters of the Holy Names of Jesus and Mary and a leading advocate of the Confederated Tribes of Siletz Indians of Oregon. She successfully advocated for the restoration of federal recognition of the Confederated Tribes of Siletz Indians. The tribe regained federal recognition in 1977.

Sister Francella was born Florence Griggs on February 5, 1920, to Lloyd Manley and Amanda West Griggs. She graduated from St. Mary School in Medford, Oregon. The oldest of two sisters, Grigg's parents both died when she was young. She and her sister were raised at the Christie School, as the school is now called, in Marylhurst, Oregon, by the Sisters of the Holy Names of Jesus and Mary.

Griggs entered the Sisters of the Holy Names of Jesus and Mary and took her vows on February 5, 1943, which was her 23rd birthday. She completed bachelor's degrees in English and Spanish. Sister Francella then taught at high schools throughout the Pacific Northwest, including Holy Names Academy in Seattle, Holy Names Academy in Spokane, Sacred Heart Academy in Salem, Oregon, St. Mary's High School in Eugene, Oregon, Star of the Sea in Astoria, Oregon, and St. Mary's Academy in Portland, Oregon. In 1975, she was listed at the director of the Chicano-Indian Study Center of Oregon (CISCO), housed at the former site of Camp Adair just north of Corvallis, Oregon. That same year, she was serving on Portland Metropolitan Human Relations Commission. In 1976, Griggs was appointed to a committee to select the recipient of the Portland Board of Education's McPherson Memorial Award for Interracial Understanding, which was given to Creston Elementary School.

Griggs began focusing on Native American issues beginning in the late 1960s. She joined a commission to restore federal recognition of the Confederated Tribes of Siletz Indians, which she and her family were members. She collaborated with several Oregon United States representatives for federal recognition, which was restored in 1977. She became a professor at the Indian Center of Eastern Oregon State College, now known Eastern Oregon University, in La Grande, Oregon. She also served as the executive director of the Portland Urban Indian Program.

Griggs died on January 7, 2012, at the Marie-Rose Center at Mary's Woods in Lake Oswego, Oregon, at the age of 91. She was the oldest member of the Confederated Tribes of Siletz Indians at the time. Her Mass of Christian Burial was held at the Mary's Woods Provincial House Chapel in Lake Oswego and she was buried in a family plot on the Siletz Indian reservation.
