= Santiam people =

Native American tribe

The Santiam people are an indigenous people of the Northwest Plateau, living in Oregon.

They are a Kalapuyan tribe, whose traditional homelands were on the banks of the Santiam River, which feeds into the Willamette River.

Today, they are enrolled in the Confederated Tribes of the Grand Ronde Community and the Confederated Tribes of Siletz Indians.
