= Alsea =

Ethnic group from western Oregon, U.S.

Total population
- 1774: 3,060 1806: 1,700; 1875: 1,800; 1961: 12 2010: 7

Regions with significant populations
- Oregon

Languages
- Alsea

Religion
- Not a lot is known about Alsea religion/beliefs. It is thought to be similar to that of the Coos

Related ethnic groups
- Yaquina

The Alsea are a Native American tribe of Western Oregon. They are (since 1856), confederated with other Tribes on the Siletz Reservation, Oregon, and are members of the Confederated Tribes of Siletz.

Their origin story says that the Yaquina, Alsea, Yachats, Lower Umpqua, and Siuslaw people are all one tribe, and speak the same language. Today however, the Yakonan language branch is divided into Alsean and Siuslawan. The Alsean people (Yaquina/Alsea/Yachats) all practiced forehead flattening (by slight pressure applied in baby's cradleboard) until about 1860. The Alsea signed the 1855 Coast Treaty, agreeing to share their homelands with other Tribes when the Siletz Reservation was to be established, the treaty not being ratified by the U.S. Senate, the appropriations never arrived. The Confederated Tribes of Siletz Indians, represented Tillamook, Yaquina, Alsea, Coquille, Tututni, Chetco aboriginal title compensation claims in the 1940s–50s. The lawsuit “Alsea Band of Tillamooks et al vs the United States”. The confederated Tribes of Siletz Indians won that case, and some compensation was received about 1959.

== Name ==
The name "Alsea" comes from /alsíiya/, the name applied to the Alseas by their neighbors, the Tillamook and Coos peoples.

Kûnis'tûnne is their Chastacosta name. Päifan amím is their Luckiamute Kalapuya name. Si ni'-te-li tunne is their Naltunne name, meaning "flatheads." Tcha yáxo amim is their Luckiamute Kalapuya name. Tehayesátlu is their Nestucca name.

== Geography ==
The Alsea lived on the western coast of Oregon, around what is now Alsea Bay at the mouth of the Alsea River.

=== Villages ===
Alsea villages include:

- Chiink, on the south side of the Alsea River.
- Kakhtshanwaish, on the north side of the Alsea River.
- Kalbusht, on the lower course of the Alsea River.
- Kauhuk, on the south side of the Alsea River.
- Kaukhwan, on the north side of the Alsea River at Beaver Creek.
- Khlimkwaish, on the south side of the Alsea River.
- Khlokhwaiyutslu, on the north side of the Alsea River.
- Kutauwa, on the north side of the Alsea River at its mouth.
- Kwamk, on the south side of the Alsea River.
- Kwulisit, on the south side of the Alsea River.
- Kyamaisu, on the north side of the Alsea River at its mouth.
- Panit, on the south side of the Alsea River.
- Shiuwauk, on the north side of the Alsea River.
- Skhakhwaiyutslu, on the south side of the Alsea River.
- Tachuwit, on the north side of the Alsea River.
- Thlekuhweyuk, on the south side of the Alsea River.
- Thlekushauk, on the south side of the Alsea River.

John R. Swanton wrote the following in his 1953 book The Indian Tribes of North America: "Mooney (1928) estimates the number of Indians belonging to the Yakonan stock at 6,000 in 1780. The census of 1910 returned 29 Indians under this name, and that of 1930 only 9 under the entire Yakonan stock."

== Culture ==
The Alsea hunted seals and sea lions, fished for salmon, and gathered camas roots. Like many tribes in the area, they flattened the heads of infants. They placed their dead in canoes on isolated land jutting into estuaries.

=== Language ===
Alsea was an Alsean language very closely related to Yaquina. By 1910, it was almost extinct, with fewer than six people having a speaking knowledge of the language.

=== Religion ===
Very little is known about Alsea religion. It is thought to be similar to that of the Coos. Alsea shamans promoted good salmon runs and the Alsea appealed to animal spirits and powers in nature for aid.

=== Arts ===
The Alsea wore robes of seal skin, wove baskets, and made grass raincoats.

== See also ==
- List of federally recognized tribes in the contiguous United States
