= Coast Oregon Penutian languages =

Proposed language family of North America

Coast Oregon Penutian
- (proposed)
- Geographic distribution: western North America
- Linguistic classification: Penutian?: Coast Oregon Penutian
- Subdivisions: Alsean †; Siuslaw †; Coosan †

Language codes
- Glottolog: None

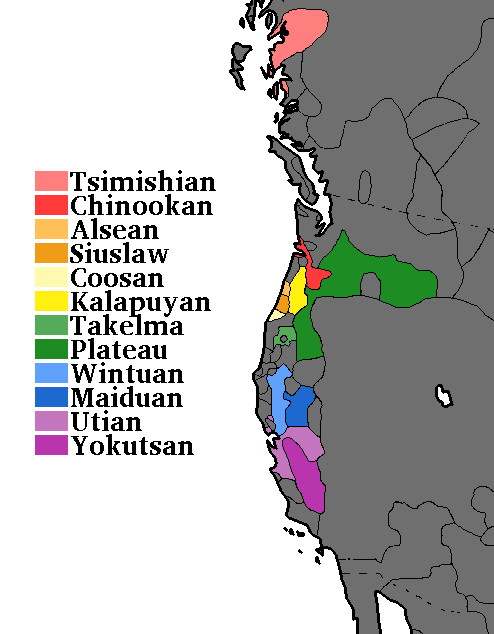
A map showing distribution of Penutian languages.

The Coast Oregon Penutian languages are a proposed family of three small languages or language clusters on the Oregon Coast that has moderate support. Although much of their similarity is demonstrably due to language contact, linguists such as Scott DeLancey believe they may be genealogically related at a greater time depth. They are part of the much more hypothetical Penutian proposal.

== Languages ==
The Coast Oregon Penutian languages are:

- Alsean
  - Yaquina, spoken on the central Oregon coast around Yaquina Bay & along the Yaquina River (central Oregon coast) by the Yaquina people
  - Alsea, spoken on the central Oregon coast around Alsea Bay and along the Alsea and Yachats rivers by the Alsea people
- Siuslaw
  - Siuslaw dialect spoken on the central Oregon coast along the Siuslaw River and around Siltcoos Lake
  - Kuitsh dialect spoken on the central Oregon coast around Winchester Bay and along the lower Umpqua and Smith rivers.
- Coosan
  - possibly several Hanis dialects spoken along the southern Oregon coast in the vicinity of Coos Bay and along the Coos River.
  - possibly one or two Miluk dialects spoken along the southern Oregon coast around South Slough of Coos Bay and along the lower Coquille River.

All Coast Oregon Penutian languages became extinct in the 20th century.

== Vocabulary ==
Below is a comparison of selected basic vocabulary items in Alsea, Coos, and Lower Umpqua (a Coosan language variety). The lexical data is from Leo J. Frachtenberg's works.

gloss	Alsea	Coos	Lower Umpqua
head	kusiʼntsi, ʟōkˑ	xwî´l̄uxᵘ	xwā´ka
hair	pelūʽʼpᴇlū, ʟōʼsin	xˑne´kˑ; yı̂´akᵘ	hī´qūⁱ
eye	hayaʼnīyustǃ, kˑǃīkˑ	xwa´lxwal	kōpx
ear	tskwaīʼsalyustǃ	kᵘha´n̄as	qa´kwīx
nose	tᴇsiʼn	tcūɬ	ʟᵒwa´sî
tooth	tǃᴇliʼl	qtsä	tʼîx
tongue	stilaʼkˑayustǃ	he´ˡlta	tʽǃa´lˑtʽǃalˑ
mouth	kxai	ye´es	ʟaa´
hand	tāʼmtᴇm	kˑe´ɬa	tcīʟ; ʟpīkᵘ
foot	yūⁿʼsalyustǃ	kxla	tsı̄kᵘ
breast	ɫkwa᷇ⁿ	gā 'nipple'	ɬqū´wa (of man)
meat	hatsīʼlāl	tǃeˣt	nı̄ʟ
blood	puʼstᴇx	wı̂´tı̂n	qā´wī
bone	qēʼkus	lā´makˑ (pl.)	tsnā´wî
person	hīʼtsʟᴇm	ma	hītc
name	ʟān, ɫaʼni	ɬn̻´nas	ɬīn
dog	tsqax, tsqēⁿx	kwī´yos < Jargon	cqaxtc < Siuslaw
fish	tsūdaīʼs		ɬtʼī´aⁱ̄
louse		täts; mî´tcîɬ	ta´wî
tree	kōts, kōʼxᵘ		ɬqaⁱ´ʽtū
leaf	kˑ'ēʼpau	ɬⁱnēlˑ	ʟǃīp
flower	hālēʼtxaū		tcāᵃxānᵋ
water	kˑiʼlū	xāᵃp	tcī
fire	tkᴇlɫtsǃīʼs, ʟkˑilīʼtǃa	tc!waɬ	ʟīya´aᵘ
stone	kˑlīl	kᵘɬī´yex	qayū´ʷⁱnts
earth	leʽwīʼ	ʟǃtā	ʟǃa´ᵃⁱ
salt	qaʼlōs	mî´tsǃlîs	hîlˑa´xwa
road	yāʼxalīᵋtǃ, xˑūʼlamīt'	he´wı̂lts	txaⁱnᵋ
eat	nūns-	qǃm-; ʟōᵘ-	ɬītǃ-
die	hask-, qan-	e´qe	xaū-
I	qan	n̻; nᴇx	nà
you	nīx	eᵋ	nı̄xᵃts
