= Shasta Costa =

Native American tribe of southwestern Oregon

The Shasta Costa (also known as the Chasta Costa, Shastacosta, Chastacosta, Shastao-Skoton, Shista-Kkhwusta or Shistakwasta) are a Native American tribe, one of Lower Rogue River Athabascan tribes from southwestern Oregon, who originally lived on the Rogue River and its tributaries, or, more precisely, on the "Lower Illinois River and the Rogue River between present-day Agness and Foster Bar." They spoke Shasta Costa dialect of Tututni (also known as Lower Rogue River Athabaskan) language. They were classified as Rogue River Indians for the purposes of treaty negotiation. One of their villages, Tlegetlinten, was located near Agness, and was eventually "occupied by Euro-American settlers."

The Shasta Costa were "driven from their villages" by miners in the 1850s.

In January 1856, two miners near the junction of the Illinois and Rogue Rivers were killed. It was never known if the miners were killed by the Indians living in the area or if they were killed by other miners in the area. The military sent Lieutenants John Chandler and John Drysdale with seventeen men to the fork of the Illinois and Rogue Rivers to persuade the "Shis-ta-koos-tee" ... band to leave their settlement and move to the coast to avoid further disruptions between miners and Indians. According to Beckham, "When the young lieutenants were not able to induce the peaceful bands to leave their plank houses for the uncertainties of life near the white settlements, the troops fell back to the towns at the mouth of the Rogue River."

Later that winter, a group of Indians surrendered following a battle at the Big Bend of the Rogue, and by June, members of the tribe were sent to the Siletz Reservation or Grand Ronde Reservation.

In 1856, there were 153 Shasta Costa and in 1937 there were only 30. The descendants of the Shasta Costa are now a part of the Confederated Tribes of Siletz.

== See also ==
- Confederated Tribes of Siletz
