= Siuslaw people =

Indigenous people in Oregon, U.S.

Siuslaw
sha’yuushtl’a
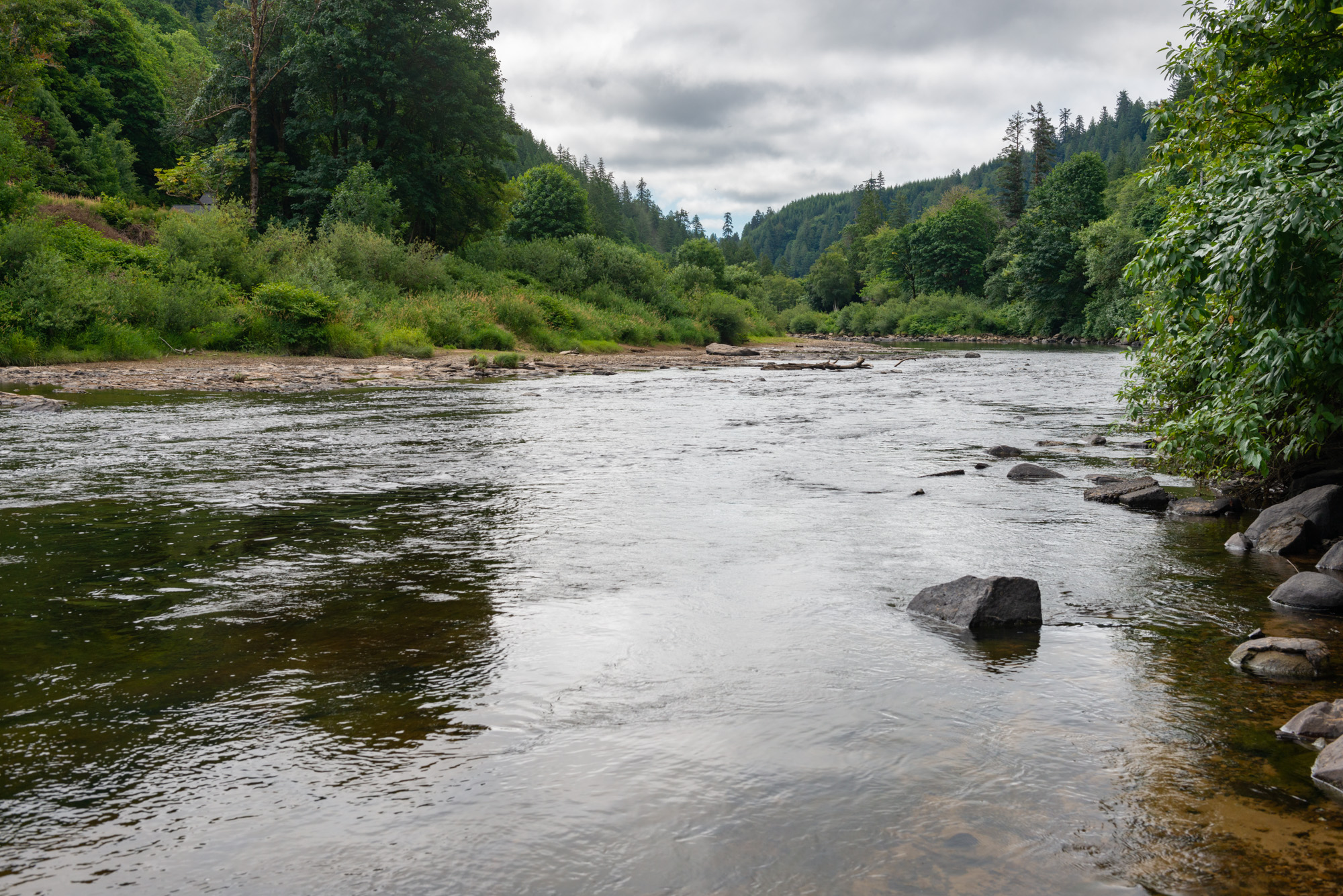
- Siuslaw people have historically lived along and near the Siuslaw River in southwestern Oregon

Regions with significant populations
- Oregon

Languages
- English, formerly Siuslaw language

Related ethnic groups
- Lower Umpqua

The Siuslaw are an Indigenous people of the Pacific Northwest. Their autonym is sha’yuushtl’a.

Today Siuslaw people are enrolled with the Confederated Tribes of Siletz Indians and the Confederated Tribes of Coos, Lower Umpqua and Siuslaw Indians located on the southwest Oregon, on the Pacific Coast.

== Territory ==
Historically, the Siuslaw lived along the Siuslaw River in western Oregon. They had 34 distinct named villages in the 1880s.

== Language ==
The Siuslaw are closely related to the Lower Umpqua (or Kuitsh), and both group spoke dialects of Siuslaw language, a Coast Oregon Penutian language. The Siuslaw language is extinct.

== History ==
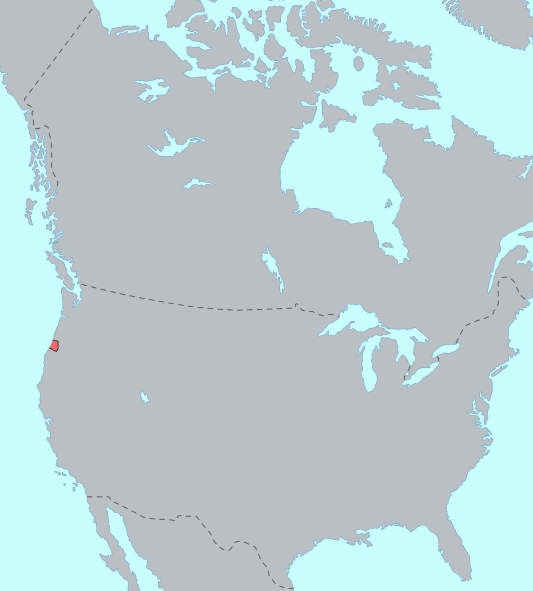
Historical territory of Suislaw people

The Siuslaw people lived in their villages along the Siuslaw River for centuries until 1860, when they were forcibly removed to an Indian reservation in Yachats, Oregon.

The Siuslaw, Coos, and Lower Umpqua had signed the 1855 Empire Treaty; however, the United States failed to ratify this treaty and lost it until 1916. In 1918, members of these three tribes who were not enrolled in the Confederated Siletz Tribes sued the U.S. federal government in the U.S. Court of Claims for federal recognition. After two decades in 1938, the court ruled against the tribes. They filed suits with the Indian Claims Commission in 1951 and 1952 but were rejected. Despite not having secured recognition, these tribes were included in the 1954 law terminating recognition of more than 61 tribes in Oregon that went into effect in 1966. In 1984, the U.S. Congress recognized the Confederated Tribes of the Coos, Lower Umpqua and Siuslaw Indians through legislation.
