= Confederated Tribes of Coos, Lower Umpqua and Siuslaw Indians =

Indian tribe in Oregon, United States

Confederated Tribes of the Coos, Lower Umpqua and Siuslaw Indians of Oregon
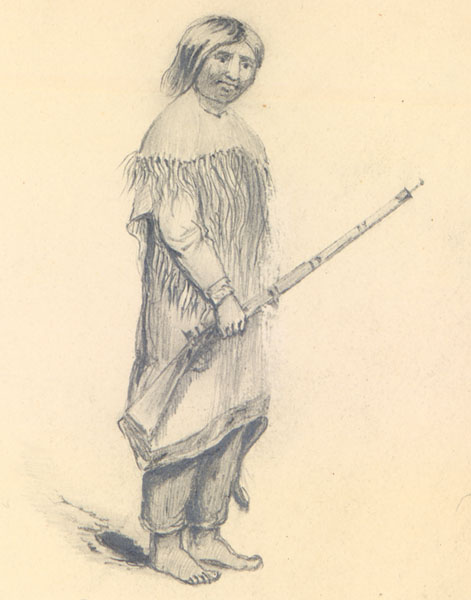
- Drawing of an Umpqua man

Total population
- ≈ 1300 (2020s)

Regions with significant populations
- United States(Oregon)

Languages
- English, formerly Coos, Siuslaw, and Kuitsh (Lower Umpqua)

Religion
- Traditional Tribal Religion

Related ethnic groups
- Other Coos, Lower Umpqua, and Siuslaw people

The Confederated Tribes of the Coos, Lower Umpqua and Siuslaw Indians of Oregon are a federally recognized Native American tribe of Hanis Coos, Miluk Coos, Lower Umpqua (or Kuitsh), and Siuslaw people in Oregon.

== Lands ==
Map of the Coos, Lower Umpqua and Siuslaw Reservation with neighbouring reservations (In orange)

The service area of the Confederated Tribes of the Coos, Lower Umpqua and Siuslaw Indians includes lands in a five-county area spanning Coos, Curry, Lincoln, Douglas, and Lane Counties.

== Government ==
The Confederated Tribes of the Coos, Lower Umpqua and Siuslaw Indians are headquartered in Coos Bay, Oregon. The tribe is governed by a democratically elected general council, serving four-year terms. The tribal chief serves ten-year terms. The current tribal government leadership is as follows:

- Chief: Doug Barrett
- Chairman: Teresa Spangler
- Vice-chair: Brad Kneaper
- Councilperson: Julie Siestreem
- Councilperson: Iliana Montiel
- Councilperson: Debbie Bossley
- Councilperson: Ashley Russell

== Languages ==
Members of the Confederated Tribes of Coos, Lower Umpqua and Siuslaw speak English. Formerly they spoke the Coos language and Siuslaw language (Siuslaw and Kuitsh dialects), which is a language isolate. The tribe runs a language program to revive Coos and Siuslaw.

== Economic development ==
The Confederated Tribes of Coos, Lower Umpqua and Siuslaw owns and operates:

- Three Rivers Resort, a Class 3 Facility in Florence, Oregon.
- Three Rivers Casino, a Class 2 Facility in the Empire District of Coos Bay, Oregon.
- Blue Earth Federal Corporation

== History ==
The tribes did not have contact with Europeans until 1792. In 1828, Lower Umpqua (Kuitsh) people massacred members of the Jedediah Smith Party and attacked the Hudson's Bay Company's fort in 1838. Most of their population died in the epidemics which followed European contact.

In 1860 the remnants of these and other tribes were forced onto the Siletz Reservation. The reservation was split into three parts, with one section being opened to non-native settlement and another becoming the Alsea Reservation, which was opened to non-native settlement in 1875.

The Confederated Tribes of Coos, Lower Umpqua and Siuslaw formally organized in 1916. They adopted their first constitution in 1938 and ratified their current constitution in 1987.
