= Yaquina people =

Tribe of Native Americans in Oregon

The Yaquina or Yaqo'n people were a tribe of Native Americans. There were 19 Yaquina in 1910. Their language was one of the Yakonan languages. The Yaquina lived around the Yaquina River and Yaquina Bay, both of which have been named after them. The town of Yaquina, Oregon, has also been named after the tribe. The Yaqo'n remaining after the tribe was decimated by disease lived on the Coastal Indian Reservation, the territory of which was greatly reduced to the Siletz Indian Reservation. Descendants of the Yaqo'n are members of the Confederated Tribes of Siletz Indians.

== Villages ==
=== North of Yaquina River ===
Yaquina villages north of the Yaquina River were:

- Holukhik
- Hunkkhwitik
- Iwai
- Khaishuk
- Khilukh
- Kunnupiyu
- Kwulaishauik
- Kyaukuhu
- Kyuwatkal
- Mipshuntik
- Mittsulstik
- Shash
- Thlalkhaiuntik
- Thlekakhaik
- Tkhakiyu
- Tshkitshiauk
- Tthilkitik
- Ukhwaiksh
- Yahal
- Yikkhaich

=== South side of Yaquina River ===
Yaquina villages south of the Yaquina River were:

- Atshuk
- Chulithltiyu
- Hakkyaiwal
- Hathletukhish
- Hitshinsuwit
- Hiwaitthe
- Kaku
- Khaiyukkhai
- Khitalaitthe
- Kholkh
- Khulhanshtauk
- Kilauutuksh
- Kumsukwum
- Kutshuwitthe
- Kwaitshi
- Kwilaishauk
- Kwulchichicheshk
- Kwullaish
- Kwullakhtauik
- Kwutichuntthe
- Mulshintik
- Naaish
- Paiinkhwutthu
- Pikiiltthe
- Pkhulluwaaitthe
- Pkuuniukhtauk
- Puuntthiwaun
- Shilkhotshi
- Shupauk
- Thlekwiyauik
- Thlelkhus
- Thlinaitshtik
- Thlukwiutshthu
- Tkulmashaauk
- Tuhaushuwitthe
- Tulshk
