= Alsea language =

Extinct Native American language formerly spoken in Oregon

Alsea
- Alsea–Yaquina, Yakonan, Alséya
- Native to: United States
- Region: Oregon
- Ethnicity: Alsea people, Yaquina people
- Extinct: 1951, with the death of John Albert
- Language family: Coast Oregon Penutian?: Alsea
- Dialects: Alsea; Yaquina

Language codes
- ISO 639-3: aes
- Glottolog: alse1251
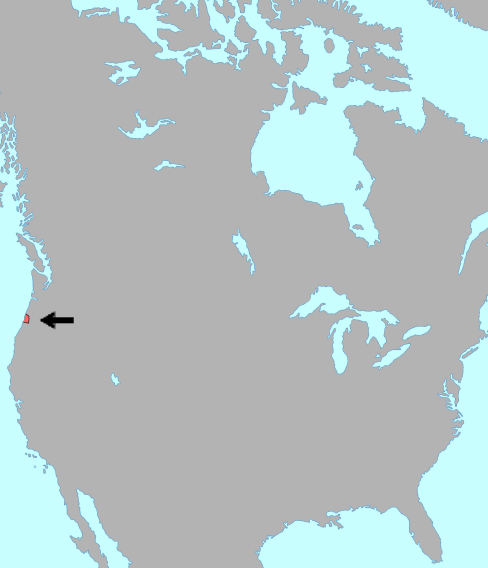
- Pre-contact distribution of Alsean

Alsea /ˈælsiː/ or Alsean (also Yakonan) and Yaquina were two closely related speech varieties spoken along the central Oregon coast until the early 1950s. They are sometimes taken to be different languages, but it is difficult to be sure given the poor state of attestation; Mithun believes they were probably dialects of a single language. They are commonly held to be components of a language isolate.

== Classification ==
Alsea is usually considered to belong to the Penutian phylum, and may form part of a Coast Oregon Penutian subgroup together with Siuslaw and the Coosan languages. Numerous lexical resemblances between Alsea and the Northern Wintuan languages, however, are more likely the result of borrowing about 1,500 years ago when the (Northern) Wintuan speech community appears to have been located in Oregon. Alsea is also considered to be a language isolate.

== Varieties ==
- Alsea
  - Alsea (Alséya) †
  - Yaquina (Yakwina, Yakona) †

Both are now extinct.

The name Alsea derives from the Coosan name for them, alsí or alsí·, and the Marys River Kalapuyan name for them, alsí·ya. Alsea was last recorded in 1942 from the last speaker, John Albert, by J. P. Harrington. Albert died in 1951.

The name Yaquina derives from the Alsean name for the Yaquina Bay and the Yaquina River region, yuqú·na. Yaquina was last recorded in 1884 by James Owen Dorsey.

== Phonology ==
=== Consonants ===
Alsea had 34 consonants:

		Labial	Alveolar		(Alveolo-) palatal	Velar		Uvular		Glottal	
		Labial	plain	lateral	(Alveolo-) palatal	plain	labialized	plain	labialized	plain	labialized
Plosive/ Affricate	plain	p	t		tɕ	k	kʷ	q	qʷ	ʔ	
Plosive/ Affricate	ejective	pʼ	tʼ	tɬʼ	tɕʼ	kʼ	kʷʼ	qʼ	qʷʼ		
Fricative				ɬ	ɕ	x	xʷ	χ	χʷ	h	hʷ (Note: The status of /hʷ/ is uncertain.)
Sonorant	plain	m	n	l	j		w				
Sonorant	glottalized	mʼ	nʼ	lʼ	jʼ		wʼ				

/ɕ/, /tɕ/ and /tɕ'/ are spelled as s, c and c̓ in modern descriptions. Their phonetic value has been described as "palatal", or "between alveolar and palatal".

=== Vowels ===
	Front	Back
High	i	u
Low	a	

Three vowels are listed as /a, i, u/. Long vowel variants of /i, u/ are [eː, oː]. A mid vowel /ə/ occurs as a phonetically inserted vowel sound.
