= Siletz, Oregon =

- City
- Location in Oregon
- Coordinates: 44°43′19″N 123°55′07″W
- Country: United States
- State: Oregon
- County: Lincoln
- Incorporated: 1946

Area
  - Total: 0.63 sq mi (1.63 km^{2})
  - Land: 0.63 sq mi (1.63 km^{2})
  - Water: 0 sq mi (0.00 km^{2})
- Elevation: 135 ft (41 m)

Population (2020)
  - Total: 1,230
  - Density: 1,952.0/sq mi (753.69/km^{2})
- Time zone: UTC-8 (PST)
  - Summer (DST): UTC-7 (PDT)
- ZIP code: 97380
- Area code: 541
- FIPS code: 41-67500
- GNIS feature ID: 2411900
- Website: www.cityofsiletz.org

Siletz (/sɪˈlɛts/ suh-LETS, Tolowa: Sv-le’-si) is a city in Lincoln County, Oregon, United States. The population was 1,230 at the 2020 census. The city is located next to the Siletz Reservation and is the site of the annual Nesika Illahee Pow Wow in August.

== Geography ==
According to the United States Census Bureau, the city has a total area of 0.63 square miles (1.63 km^{2}), all of it land.

== Demographics ==
Historical population
Census	Pop.	Note	%±
1950	570		—
1960	583		2.3%
1970	596		2.2%
1980	1,001		68.0%
1990	926		−7.5%
2000	1,133		22.4%
2010	1,212		7.0%
2020	1,230		1.5%
U.S. Decennial Census

=== 2020 census ===
As of the 2020 census, Siletz had a population of 1,230. The median age was 41.0 years. 26.1% of residents were under the age of 18 and 19.0% of residents were 65 years of age or older. For every 100 females there were 93.1 males, and for every 100 females age 18 and over there were 90.2 males age 18 and over.

0% of residents lived in urban areas, while 100.0% lived in rural areas.

There were 462 households in Siletz, of which 31.2% had children under the age of 18 living in them. Of all households, 47.4% were married-couple households, 18.4% were households with a male householder and no spouse or partner present, and 25.1% were households with a female householder and no spouse or partner present. About 25.3% of all households were made up of individuals and 12.1% had someone living alone who was 65 years of age or older.

There were 500 housing units, of which 7.6% were vacant. Among occupied housing units, 69.9% were owner-occupied and 30.1% were renter-occupied. The homeowner vacancy rate was 2.4% and the rental vacancy rate was 5.4%.

Racial composition as of the 2020 census
Race	Number	Percent
White	767	62.4%
Black or African American	12	1.0%
American Indian and Alaska Native	273	22.2%
Asian	3	0.2%
Native Hawaiian and Other Pacific Islander	2	0.2%
Some other race	11	0.9%
Two or more races	162	13.2%
Hispanic or Latino (of any race)	65	5.3%

=== 2010 census ===
As of the census of 2010, there were 1,212 people, 448 households, and 321 families living in the city. The population density was 1,923.8 inhabitants per square mile (742.8/km^{2}). There were 483 housing units at an average density of 766.7 per square mile (296.0/km^{2}). The racial makeup of the city was 69.7% White, 0.4% African American, 18.4% Native American, 0.4% Asian, 0.2% Pacific Islander, 1.5% from other races, and 9.4% from two or more races. Hispanic or Latino of any race were 5.0% of the population.

There were 448 households, of which 33.9% had children under the age of 18 living with them, 50.7% were married couples living together, 14.7% had a female householder with no husband present, 6.3% had a male householder with no wife present, and 28.3% were non-families. 21.0% of all households were made up of individuals, and 7.6% had someone living alone who was 65 years of age or older. The average household size was 2.67 and the average family size was 3.07.

The median age in the city was 42 years. 24.5% of residents were under the age of 18; 7.1% were between the ages of 18 and 24; 21.4% were from 25 to 44; 32.9% were from 45 to 64; and 14.3% were 65 years of age or older. The gender makeup of the city was 50.5% male and 49.5% female.

=== 2000 census ===
As of the census of 2000, there were 1,133 people, 420 households, and 315 families living in the city. The population density was 1,799.3 inhabitants per square mile (694.7/km^{2}). There were 468 housing units at an average density of 743.2 per square mile (287.0/km^{2}). The racial makeup of the city was 71.23% White, 0.44% African American, 21.01% Native American, 0.71% Asian, 0.09% Pacific Islander, 0.44% from other races, and 6.09% from two or more races. Hispanic or Latino of any race were 1.85% of the population.

There were 420 households, out of which 36.9% had children under the age of 18 living with them, 57.1% were married couples living together, 12.1% had a female householder with no husband present, and 25.0% were non-families. 19.8% of all households were made up of individuals, and 9.5% had someone living alone who was 65 years of age or older. The average household size was 2.70 and the average family size was 3.04.

In the city, the population was spread out, with 28.9% under the age of 18, 7.5% from 18 to 24, 28.9% from 25 to 44, 22.6% from 45 to 64, and 12.1% who were 65 years of age or older. The median age was 36 years. For every 100 females, there were 104.5 males. For every 100 females age 18 and over, there were 99.8 males.

The median income for a household in the city was $38,542, and the median income for a family was $42,250. Males had a median income of $32,153 versus $21,250 for females. The per capita income for the city was $14,690. About 11.0% of families and 15.4% of the population were below the poverty line, including 20.6% of those under age 18 and 8.1% of those age 65 or over.
