= Siuslaw language =

Extinct Native American language formerly spoken in Oregon

Siuslaw
- Lower Umpqua
- Šáayušƛa; Qúuiič
- Native to: United States
- Region: Oregon
- Ethnicity: Siuslaw people
- Extinct: 1960
- Language family: Coast Oregon Penutian?: Siuslaw
- Dialects: Siuslaw; Lower Umpqua

Language codes
- ISO 639-3: sis
- Glottolog: sius1254
- ELP: Siuslaw
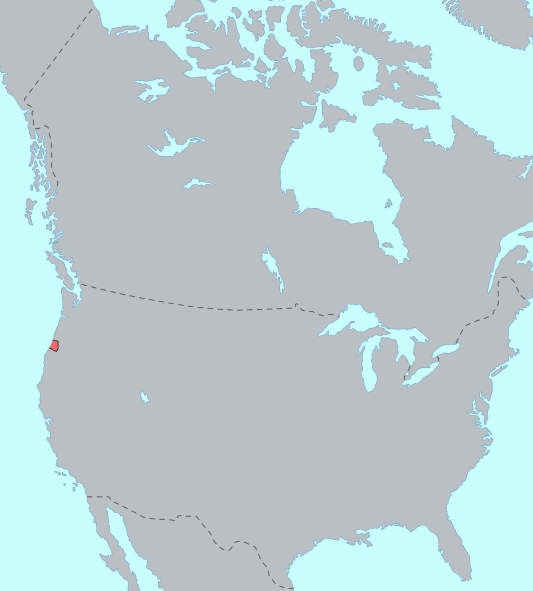
- Pre-contact distribution of Siuslaw

- Siuslaw is classified as Extinct by the UNESCO Atlas of the World's Languages in Danger.

Siuslaw /saɪˈjuːslɔː/ was the language of the Siuslaw people and Lower Umpqua (Kuitsh) people of Oregon. It is also known as Lower Umpqua. (Note: Upper Umpqua (or simply Umpqua) was an Athabaskan language and thus unrelated to Siuslaw/Lower Umpqua.) The Siuslaw language had two dialects: Siuslaw proper (Šaayušƛa) and Lower Umpqua (Quuiič).

== Classification ==
Siuslaw is currently considered to be a language isolate. It may be part of a Coast Oregon Penutian family together with Alsea and the Coosan languages, although the validity of this family is still controversial. Proponents of the disputed Penutian phylum usually include Siuslaw as part of it, together with the other Coast Oregon Penutian languages.

== Documentation ==
Published sources are by Leo J. Frachtenberg who collected data from a non-English-speaking native speaker of the Lower Umpqua dialect and her Alsean husband (who spoke it as a second language) during three months of fieldwork in 1911, and by Dell Hymes who worked with four Siuslaw speakers in 1954.

Further archived documentation consists of a 12-page vocabulary by James Owen Dorsey, a wordlist of approximately 150 words taken by Melville Jacobs in 1935 in work with Lower Umpqua speaker Hank Johnson, an audio recording of Siuslaw speaker Spencer Scott from 1941, hundreds of pages of notes from John Peabody Harrington in 1942 based on interviews with several native speakers, and audio recordings of vocabulary by Morris Swadesh in 1953.

== Phonology ==
=== Consonants ===
	Labial	Alveolar	Lateral	Palatal	Velar	Glottal
Plosive	p	t			k	ʔ
Affricate		ts	tɬ	tʃ		
Fricative		s	ɬ	ʃ	x	h
Nasal	m	n				
Approximant	w		l	j		

Cluster of stops/affricates + glottal stop are realized as ejective consonants: [pʼ, tʼ, tɬʼ, tsʼ, tʃʼ, kʼ].

=== Vowels ===
Vowels are noted as /i æ a u ə o/.
