= Coosan languages =

Language family of Oregon, US

Coosan
- Kusan
- Geographic distribution: Oregon
- Ethnicity: Coos people
- Extinct: 1972, with the death of Martha Harney Johnson (Hanis)
- Linguistic classification: Penutian?: Coast Oregon Penutian?; Coosan
- Subdivisions: Hanis; Miluk

Language codes
- Glottolog: coos1248
- Pre-contact distribution of Coosan languages in Oregon

The Coosan (also Coos or Kusan) is a small extinct language family consisting of two languages spoken along the southern Oregon coast.

== Classification ==
- Coosan
  - † Hanis
  - † Miluk (a.k.a. Lower Coquille)

Melville Jacobs (1939) says that the languages are as close as Dutch and German. They share more than half of their vocabulary, though this is not always obvious, and grammatical differences cause the two languages to look quite different.

The origin of the name Coos is uncertain: one idea is that it is derived from a Hanis stem gus- meaning 'south' as in gusimídži·č 'southward'; Another idea is that it is derived from a southwestern Oregon Athabaskan word ku·s meaning 'bay'.

Frachtenburg was the first major ethnolinguist to address the relatedness of these languages, saying that Hanis and Miluk were dialects of the same "Kusan" language. Melville Jacobs also said that they were two dialects of the same language; though he did note that Mrs. Annie Miner Peterson said they were in fact distinct languages and that Miluk had two dialects. In 1916 Edward Sapir suggested that the Coosan languages are part of a larger Oregon Penutian genetic grouping. This analysis has been accepted by some.

However, more recent work has placed Hanis and Miluk as both separate languages and part of their own language family, with Douglas-Tavani doing a comparative reconstruction of Proto-Coosan's phonemes and vocabulary

== Phonology ==
=== Vowels ===
	Front		Central		Back	
	short	long	short	long	short	long
Close	i	iː			u	uː
Mid	e	eː	ə			
Open			a	aː		

=== Diphthongs ===
ai	a*
e*	o*

=== Consonants ===
		Labial	Coronal			Dorsal			Glottal
		Labial	plain	lateral	affricate		plain	labial	Glottal
Occlusive	voice	b	d		d		g	gʷ	
Occlusive	voiceless	p	t		ts	tʃ	k	kʷ	
Occlusive	ejective	pʼ	tʼ		tsʼ	tʃʼ	kʼ	kʷʼ	
Continuant	voice	m	n	l			j		
Continuant	voiceless		s	ɬ		ʃ	x	w	h

==== Three Series of Stops ====
Aspirated	/p/, /t/, /c/, /ĉ/, /k/, /kw/, /q/, /ʔ/
Optionally Voiced	/b/, /d/, /ɜ/, /g/, /gw/, /ɢ/
Ejectives	/pʼ/, /tʼ/, /cʼ/, /kʼ/, /kwʼ/, /qʼ/

=== Key ===
- Glottal stops are represented by ʔ for ⟨ɜ⟩.
- Ejectives raised by an apostrophe (pʼ) can be substituted as exclamation points (p!)
- Length and gemination are shown by a dot (m·)
