= Tolo, Oregon =

Unincorporated community in the state of Oregon, United States

- Unincorporated community
- Nickname: Construction City
- Location within Oregon Location within the United States
- Coordinates: 42°25′27″N 122°58′17″W
- Country: United States
- State: Oregon
- County: Jackson
- Established: 1888
- Elevation: 1,198 ft (365 m)
- Time zone: UTC-8 (Pacific (PST))
  - Summer (DST): UTC-7 (PDT)
- Area code: 541/458
- GNIS feature ID: 1136834

Tolo is an unincorporated community in Jackson County, Oregon, United States, located north of Interstate 5, between Central Point and Gold Hill, south of Sams Valley. Platted near the site of the Willow Springs mining camp, the town was envisioned to be one of the biggest cities of Southern Oregon. Tolo was platted in 1888, but was virtually abandoned by the year 1918. In 1986, the Jackson County Commission returned the plat to public ownership.

== History ==
Prior to the arrival of settlers in mid-19th century, Shasta, Takelma, Latgawa, and Athabaskan Indians lived in the Rogue River valley. Early Hudson's Bay Company hunters and trappers, following the Siskiyou Trail, passed through the area in the 1820s. In the late 1840s, settlers (mostly American) following the Applegate Trail began passing through the area. By the early 1850s, the Donation Land Act brought many white settlers into the Rogue Valley and in conflict with its Native people. These often violent clashes prompted the signing of the Table Rock Treaty on September 10, 1853.

=== Table Rock Treaty and Fort Lane ===
The Table Rock Treaty established the first reservation in the Pacific Northwest, the Table Rock Indian Reservation, which encompassed Upper and Lower Table Rock, Sams Valley, and the Evans Creek and Sardine Creek watersheds. The treaty also called for a fort to protect the Indians from the ambitions of the white settlers. Fort Lane was constructed in 1853 in what was to become Willow Springs, and later, Tolo. It was occupied by two companies of the U.S. Army's 1st Dragoons under the command of Captain Andrew Jackson Smith. The fort was used to maintain the peace between the pioneers and native peoples. However, tensions and violence continued to mount, leading to the Rogue River Wars of 1855–1856. Joel Palmer, Oregon Superintendent of Indian Affairs, ordered the removal of the Indians of southwest Oregon to the Coastal Indian Reservation of northern Oregon. Fort Lane became the Army headquarters for the removal.

=== Growth of the community ===
After the removal of the Indians, Willow Springs continued to grow. The Willow Springs post office was opened in 1864. Mines, quarries, and mills sprang up in the area. In 1871, the Department of the Interior relinquished Fort Lane, which was subsequently purchased by investors.

In 1886, the name Willow Springs was officially changed to Tolo. Popular belief is that the intended name was to be Yolo in tribute to Yolo County, California, but that the postal authorities misread the "Y", mistaking it for a "T", thus naming the Post Office "Tolo". Examination of the 1886 application to the Post Office Department reveals, however, that the first name selected was "Table Rock," apparently rejected because at the time two-word names for new post offices were not being accepted. "Table Rock" was then crossed off on the 1886 form and replaced with a very clearly written "Tolo." Tolo is a word from the Chinook Jargon, and means a "windfall" or "payday", possibly reinforcing the hopes of its founders that Tolo would become one of the larger cities in Southern Oregon, with prosperity for all.

In 1888, Tolo was platted by lawyer and former Oregon Supreme Court Chief Justice Paine Page Prim.

Tolo began to dwindle around the turn of the 20th century. Tolo post office closed in 1897. Around that time, two brothers from New York, Colonel Frank H. Ray, and Doctor Charles R. Ray began developments in Tolo. The post office re-opened in 1898. The Ray brothers opened a rock quarry, which led to Tolo's nickname of "Construction City". From 1902 to 1904, the Ray brothers constructed the Gold Ray Dam, the first hydro-electric plant in Southern Oregon, bringing electricity to the region.

=== Demise ===
By 1915, it appeared that Tolo was not going to become the large city envisioned by its founders. The population remained at 150, and the momentum for growth was lacking, despite the city having a brick plant, quarry, sawmill, and gold mines. In 1918, the post office closed permanently, along with the railroad depot. In 1986, the Jackson County Commission returned the plat, which contained 474 building lots, along with public streets, to public ownership.

== Future ==
The Tolo area is designated by Jackson County Commissioners for future industrial development, along with the Medford Industrial Park in White City.

== See also ==
- List of Chinook Jargon placenames
