= Latgawa =

Native American people residing in Oregon

Latgawa are Native American people who lived in the Rogue Valley of interior southwest Oregon. In their own language "Latgawa" /latʰka:wàʔ/ means "those living in the uplands," though they were also known as the Walumskni by the neighboring Klamath tribe.

They are close relatives of the Takelma (Dagelma) ("(Those) Along the River"), which were also known as Lowland or River Takelma. The Latgawa were often called Upland Takelma.

== History ==
The Latgawa were located in the upper Rogue River valley eastward to the former Table Rock Indian Reservation and Bear Creek and in the neighborhood of Jacksonville, Oregon. Together with other tribes along the Rogue River, they were grouped as the Rogue River Tribe, but after the Rogue River Wars in 1856, bands of the Rogue River were split between the Siletz Indian Reservation or the Grand Ronde Indian Reservation far to the north of the tribe's traditional lands. The Latgawa were one of two peoples who spoke the Takelma language. The Takelma lived mainly on the east side of the Klamath and Coast Mountains in the middle Rogue River area around Grants Pass, Oregon; and the Latgawa in the upper Rogue River area around Applegate, Jacksonville, Talent, Medford, Eagle Point, Butte Falls, Shady Cove, Trail, and extending beyond Prospect and Union up to Crater Lake.

=== Pre-European contact days ===
The Latgawa relied on hunting, gathering, and fishing for their subsistence. Latgawa dwellings were small brush shelters for warm months and constructed of sugar pine boards for cold months. They adorned their garments with Dentalium shell, and skin art was practiced regularly. They also bore cultural traits from California, and valued obsidian and Shasta basket hats. During the winters, extended family bands resided in semi-permanent villages at lower elevations often situated at the meeting of major streams, where the spring steelhead runs would provide a welcome supply of fish. From late spring through early fall, they typically spent much time in the nearby uplands and mountains, following game and harvesting plant foods as the snow melted from higher elevations. By autumn, hunters and gatherers regrouped with village elders and others along the lower-elevation streams to intercept the fall salmon run and prepare for another winter.

=== Contact with European settlers ===
With the arrival of the European settlers in the 1850s, the Latgawa and Takelma began to have their homeland stolen. Like their neighbors, the Latgawa resisted encroachment on their lands and became embroiled in the bloody Rogue River Wars of the 1850s. Rogue Valley Indians were killed or captured, but some escaped. The U.S. Army exiled the remaining Takelma and Latgawa to the Grand Ronde Reservation many miles to the north, where they arrived both overland and by sea. An 1853 treaty established the Table Rock Reservation in order to throw open the entire Bear Creek and Rogue Valley to white settlement. In the end, from 1855 to 1856, a final Indian War raged from one end of the Rogue Valley to the other. The natives were again forced to move from Table Rock to the Grande Ronde and Siletz reservations.

== Bibliography ==
- Beckham, Stephen Dow. (1996). Requiem for a People: The Rogue Indians and the Frontiersmen. Corvallis, Oregon: Oregon State University Press. ISBN 0-87071-521-6.
- Campbell, Lyle. (1997). American Indian languages: The historical linguistics of Native America. New York: Oxford University Press. ISBN 0-19-509427-1.
- Douthit, Nathan. (2002). Uncertain Encounters: Indians and Whites at Peace and War in Southern Oregon 1820s-1860s. Corvallis, Oregon: Oregon State University Press. ISBN 0-87071-549-6.
- Hannon, Nan. (1990). An Underview of Southwest Oregon in Living with the Land: the Indians of Southwest Oregon. Nan Hannon and Richard K. Olmo (eds.). Medford, Oregon: Southern Oregon Historical Society.
- Goddard, Ives (Ed.). (1996). Languages. Handbook of North American Indians (W. C. Sturtevant, General Ed.) (Vol. 17). Washington, D. C.: Smithsonian Institution. ISBN 0-16-048774-9.
- Gray, Dennis J. (1987). The Takelmas and Their Athapascan Neighbors: A New Ethnographic Synthesis for the Upper Rogue River Area of Southwestern Oregon, University of Oregon Anthropological Papers, No. 37. Eugene: Department of Anthropology, University of Oregon.
- LaLande, Jeff. (1987). First Over the Siskiyous: Peter Skene Ogden's 1826-1827 Journey through the Oregon-California Borderlands. Portland: Oregon Historical Society Press.
- LaLande, Jeff. (1990) The Indians of Southwest Oregon: An Ethnohistorical Review. in Living with the Land: The Indians of Southwest Oregon Nan Hannon and Richard K. Olmo (eds.). Medford, Oregon: Southern Oregon Historical Society. ISBN 0-943388-08-2.
- Mithun, Marianne. (1999). The languages of Native North America. Cambridge: Cambridge University Press. ISBN 0-521-23228-7 (hbk); ISBN 0-521-29875-X.
- Sapir, Edward. (1922). "The Takelma Language of Southwest Oregon," in Franz Boas (ed.), Handbook of American Indian Languages: Part 2. Washington, DC: U.S. Government Printing Office, 1922; pp. 1–296.
- Sapir, Edward. (1909). Takelma Texts. Anthropological Publications of the University Museum, Pennsylvania: University [of Pennsylvania] Publications of the University Museum. 2(1)pp. 34–42.
- Sturtevant, William C. (Ed.). (1978–present). Handbook of North American Indians (Vol. 1-20). Washington, D. C.: Smithsonian Institution. (Vols. 1–3, 16, 18-20 not yet published).
