= Fort Lane (Oregon) =

US Army fort in Southern Oregon

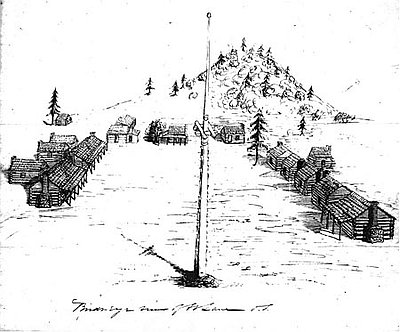
A sketch by the fort's commander. Andrew Jackson Smith.

- Fort Lane Military Post was a U.S. Army fort in Jackson County in southern Oregon established on September 21, 1853. The fort was occupied by 2 companies of the 1st Regiment of U.S. Dragoons under the command of Capt. Andrew Jackson Smith during the Rogue River War. Its site was listed on the National Register of Historic Places in 1988.

== Construction ==
The fort was built in a U shape, with no real walls and a central flagpole. 18 log huts were constructed and were apparently "As comfy as could be expected".

There were:

- 5 Officers quarters
- 4 Enlisted mens' quarters
- 1 Officer's kitchen
- 3 Enlisted men's kitchens
- 1 Guard house
- 1 Hospital
- 1 Blacksmiths shop
- 1 Quartermasters supply hut

The fort was in charge of administering the Table Rock Indian Reservation from 1854-55. After white settlers massacred the inhabitants of an Indian village, the remaining Indians fled to the fort in hopes of a safe refuge. While these natives fled to the fort, chiefs by the names of Tecumtum, Cholcultah, and Lympe declared war on the settlers and began to killing settlers and burning cabins. When they were finally beaten, Fort Orford and Fort Lane were used as staging grounds before the remaining Indians were moved onto reservations up north. On February 23, 1856, before the war was even over, the Indians interned at Fort Lane were marched 260 mi to the Grand Ronde Reservation, and were escorted by 106 men under Lt. William B. Hazen.

== Post-War ==
The fort was abandoned on September 17, 1856, after all of the Indians had been removed to the Coastal Reservations. None of the buildings remain today, and the site has experienced periodical vandalism and looting. On April 28, 2008, the site was given to the Oregon Parks and Recreation, who said they would put $135,000 towards improving the site and adding bathrooms among other things.

== See also ==
- National Register of Historic Places listings in Jackson County, Oregon
