= List of Indian reservations in Oregon =

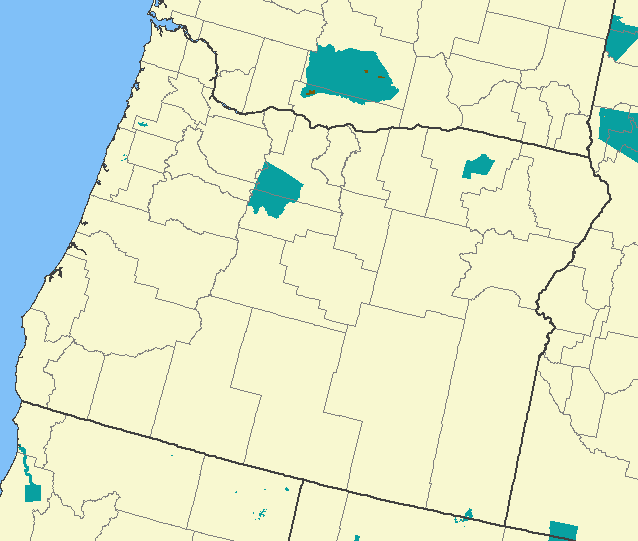
Indian land

This is a list of Indian reservations in the U.S. state of Oregon.

== Existing reservations ==
There are seven Native American reservations in Oregon that belong to seven of the nine federally recognized Oregon tribes:

- Burns Paiute Indian Colony, of the Burns Paiute Tribe: 13,738 acres (55.60 km^{2}) in Harney County
- Coos, Lower Umpqua and Siuslaw Reservation, of Confederated Tribes of Coos, Lower Umpqua and Siuslaw Indians is less than 10 acres (40,000 m^{2})
- Coquille Reservation includes 5,400 acres (22 km^{2}) of land held in trust for the Coquille Tribe in and around Coos Bay, Oregon
- Grand Ronde Community, of the Confederated Tribes of the Grand Ronde Community of Oregon: 11,040 acres (44.7 km^{2}), mostly in Yamhill County, with the rest in Polk County
- Siletz Reservation, of the Confederated Tribes of Siletz: 4,204 acres (17.01 km^{2}), 3,666 acres (14.84 km^{2}) of which is in Lincoln County
- Umatilla Reservation, of the Confederated Tribes of the Umatilla Indian Reservation: 172,882 acres (699.63 km^{2}), mostly in Umatilla County, with the rest in Union County
- Warm Springs Reservation, of the Confederated Tribes of Warm Springs: 641,118 acres (2,594.51 km^{2}), mostly in Wasco County and Jefferson County, with parts in Clackamas, Marion, and Linn counties

== Planned reservations ==
- Cow Creek Reservation, of the Cow Creek Band of Umpqua Tribe of Indians
- Klamath Reservation, of the Klamath Tribes

== Celilo Village ==
Celilo Village is not a reservation but is owned by the United States and held in trust by the Bureau of Indian Affairs for the use of the Umatilla, Tenino (Warm Springs) and Yakama tribes and Columbia River Indians.

== Fort McDermitt, Nevada-Oregon ==
One reservation in Oregon, for a Nevada tribe, straddles Oregon's southern border with Nevada:

- Fort McDermitt Indian Reservation, of the Fort McDermitt Paiute and Shoshone Tribes: near McDermitt in Humboldt County, Nevada and Malheur County, Oregon

== Historic reservations ==
- Coastal Indian Reservation, formed in 1856, a much smaller remnant exists as the Siletz Reservation
- Malheur Indian Reservation
- Table Rock Indian Reservation

== See also ==
- Federally recognized tribes
  - List of federally recognized Native American tribes in Oregon
- List of Indian reservations in the United States
- List of casinos in Oregon (all current casinos in Oregon are Native American owned)
- Lists of Oregon-related topics
