= Tututni =

Native American tribe

The Tututni tribe is a historic Native American tribe, one of Lower Rogue River Athabascan tribes from southwestern Oregon who signed the 1855 Coast Treaty, and were removed to the Siletz Indian Reservation in Oregon. They traditionally lived along the Rogue River and its tributaries, near the Pacific Coast between the Coquille River on the north and Chetco River in the south. Lower Rogue River Athabascan (also called Tututni) tribes are a group of Athabascan tribes (the Tututni, Upper Coquille and Shasta Costa) who were historically located in southwestern Oregon in the United States and speak the same Athabascan language, known as Lower Rogue River (or Tututni, or Tututni-Shasta Costa-Coquille).

== Rogue River Athabascans vs. Rogue River Indians ==
In its narrower sense, the term "Rogue River" refers to the Rogue River Athabascan tribes who speak two closely related languages: Lower Rogue River (also known as Tututni) and Upper Rogue River (also known as Galice-Applegate).

In its broader sense, "Rogue River" as a term refers to Rogue River Indians, a conglomeration of many tribal groups in the total Rogue River Valley area. They belong to three language families: Athabaskan, Takelma, and Shastan.

== Lower Rogue River Athabascan groups ==
The Tututni (or Lower Rogue River Athabascan) tribes included the following:

- Upper Coquille (Coquille, Mishikwutinetunne) tribe,
- Shasta Costa tribe, and
- Tututni tribe, including Euchre Creek (Yukichetunne) band.

Bands of Tututni tribe include

  - the Kwatami,
  - Tututunne,
  - Mikonotunne,
  - Chemetunne,
  - Chetleshin,
  - Kwaishtunnetunne,
  - Yukichetunne, and
  - Naltunnetunne.

=== Tututni tribe ===
"There were as many as seven Tututni groups, who were culturally related and had kinship ties. They did not, however, constitute a typical tribe because the usual sociopolitical organization, involving chiefs and governmental authority, was lacking".

I) Tututni dialect speaking:

- 1) Kwatami (Sixes) band;

- 2) Tutu-tunne (Tututunne, Tututni) band;

- 3) Mikono-tunne (Mikonotunne, Mikwunutunne, Mackanotin) band;

- 4) Cheme-tunne (Chemetunne, Joshua, Yashute) band;

- 5) Chetleshin (Pistol River) band;

- 6) Kwaish-tunne-tunne (Kwaishtunnetunne, Wishtenatin) band; and

- 7) Nal-tunne-tunne (Naltunnetunne) band;

II) Euchre Creek (Yukiche-tunne) dialect speaking:

- 8) Yukiche-tunne (Yukichetunne, Euchre Creek) band;

=== Upper Coquille tribe ===
III) Upper Coquille (Coquille, Mishi-kwutine-tunne) dialect speaking:

- 9) Coquille (Upper Coquille, Mishikwutinetunne) Tribe;

- 10) Floras Creek (Kosotshe, Kusu'me, Luckkarso, Lukkarso);

=== Shasta Costa tribe ===
IV) Chasta Costa (Shasta Costa, Chasta Kosta, Shistakoostee, Illinois River) dialect speaking:

- 11) Shasta Costa Tribe;

== Language ==
The Tututni (Lower Rogue River Athabascan) tribes spoke dialects of the Lower Rogue River (or Tututni or Tututni-Shasta Costa-Coquille) language. In the 21st century, this Pacific Coast Athabaskan language is extinct; it was classified as part of the Oregon Athabascan subgroup. Dialects were Coquille (Upper Coquille, Mishikhwutmetunee), spoken along the upper Coquille River; Tututni (Tututunne, Naltunnetunne, Mikonotunne, Kwatami, Chemetunne, Chetleshin, Khwaishtunnetunnne); Euchre Creek, and Chasta Costa (Illinois River, Šista Qʼʷə́sta).

Lower Rogue River (also known as Tututni)

dialects:
- Upper Coquille (also known as Coquille, Mishikhwutinetunee)

- Coquille (also known as Mishi-khwutine-tunee, Upper Coquille)
- Flores Creek

- Tututni

- Tututunne
- Naltunnetunne
- Mikwunutunne (also known as Mikonotunne, Mackanotin)
- Joshua (also known as Chemetunne, Yashute)
- Sixes (also known as Kwatami)
- Pistol River (also known as Chetleshin)
- Wishtenatin (also known as Khwaishtunnetunnne)

- Euchre Creek (also known as Yukichetunne)
- Chasta Costa (also known as Illinois River, Chastacosta, Chasta Kosta)

== History ==
The first contact between Tututni tribe and Europeans came in the late 1700s when British, Spanish and American ships explored Oregon's coastal region. In the spring of 1792, some Tututni met British explorer Captain George Vancouver. Merchants traded with the Tututni for sea otter pelts. With the arrival of settlers, infectious diseases new to the Native Americans were transmitted, resulting in the deaths of 75% to 90% of the populations of many Oregon native peoples. They did not have any acquired immunity to these diseases, such as smallpox, measles, and others that were endemic among Europeans and Americans.

In the 1840s the first wagon trains carrying immigrants started arriving overland to Oregon (Emigrant Road or Oregon Trail), but the region remained peaceful for some time.

During the 1850s the Tututni game trails and hunting grounds were destroyed by whites clearing land for farms. In 1851 some settlers built Port Orford on Tututni land. The Tututni came under more pressure as settlers and miners were attracted to Port Orford after the discovery of gold in the Rogue River valley. Mining activities heightened the competition for resources and tensions between the Tututni and the European Americans. Armed conflicts finally led to the Rogue River Wars of 1855–1856, in which United States troops, volunteer militia and others fought against the Native Americans. In February 1856 Tututni attacked the Gold Beach Guards, who were encamped opposite the large Tututni village at Port Orford. In the conflict the Tututni burned most of the settlers' homes between Port Orford and Smith River.

After the Rogue River Wars in 1856, the Tututni and other Rogue River Indians were removed from this area, forced to settle on the Coast Indian Reservation (the base of the Confederated Tribes of Siletz), considerably north of their traditional territory, or the Grand Ronde Indian Reservation, base of what is known as the Confederated Tribes of the Grand Ronde Community of Oregon.

The several tribes at each of these reservations have intermarried and their descendants are counted as enrolled members of the consolidated tribes.

The Tututni Tribe is not a federally acknowledged tribe, but the Confederated Tribes of Siletz is a recognized tribe.
