= Rogue River Indians =

Exonym for Native American tribes of the Rogue River Valley

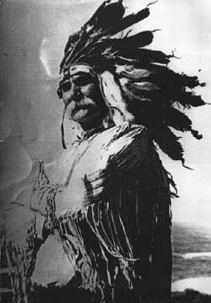
Hoxie Simmons (1872–1963), a Rogue River Indian

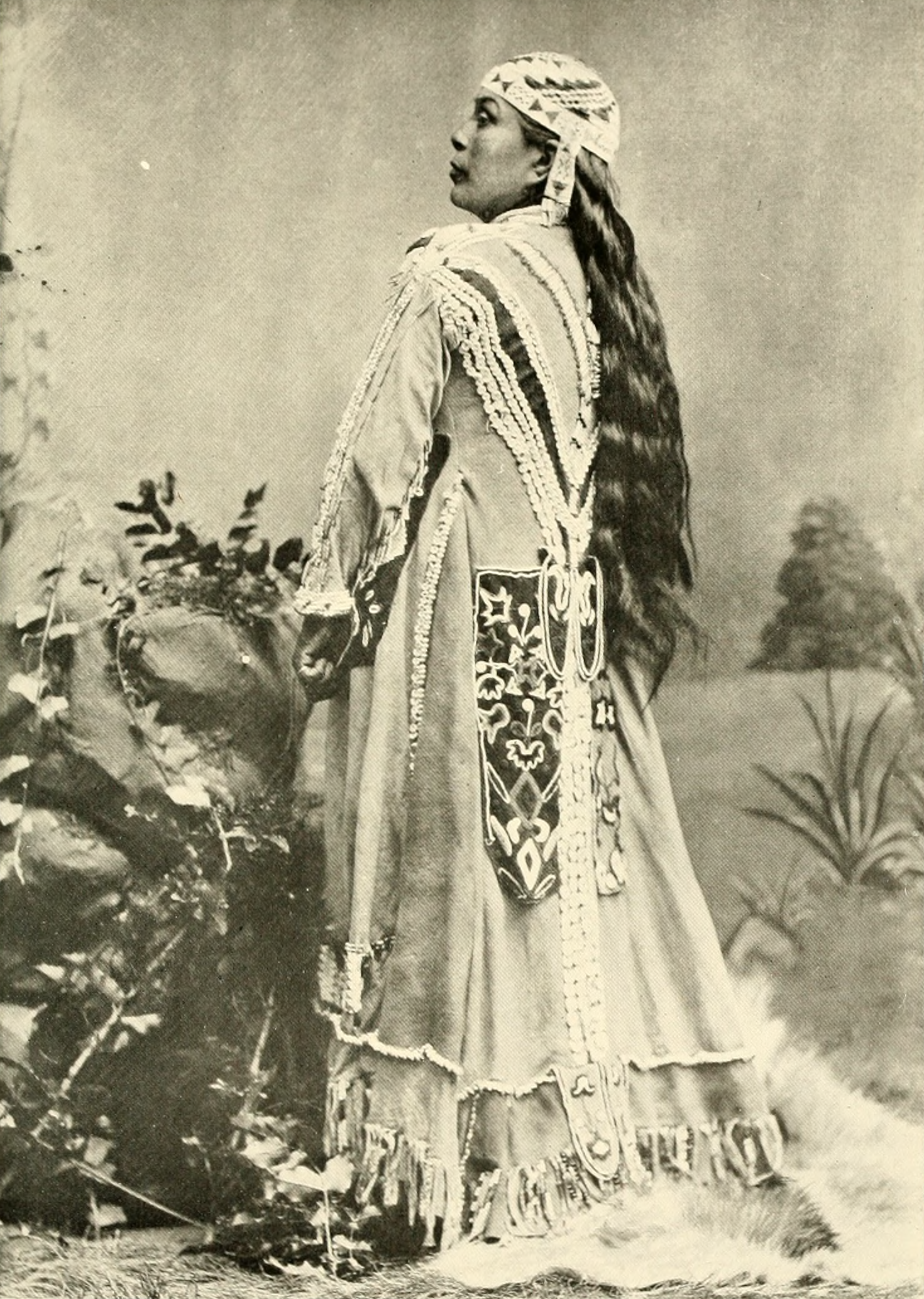
Oscharwausha, "Rogue River Indian" before 1911

Rogue River Indians are a conglomeration of many tribal groups in the Rogue River Valley area, belonging to three language families: Athabascan, Takelma, and Shastan.

== Groups ==
The principal tribes grouped under the name Rogue River Indians were:

- Lower Rogue River Athabascan (or Tututni) tribes, including:

- Upper Coquille (Mishikwutinetunne, Mishi-qute-me-tunne - ″the people dwelling on the river Mishi″) tribe (Coquille River Area),
- Shasta Costa tribe, and
- Tututni tribe (Lower Rogue River Area) (including Yukichetunne or (Yugweeche, Eu-qua-chees) band (Euchre Creek Area)) and

- Upper Rogue River Athabascan (Siskiyou: Galice-Applegate) tribes, including:

- Taltushtuntede, Taltushtuntude or (Tal-tuc-tun-te-de) tribe (Galice Creek Area) and
- Dakubetede (Da-ku-be-te-de) tribe (Applegate Area),

- Takelman tribes, including:

- Latgawa (Upland Takelma),
- Takelma (Dagelma) (Lowland or River Takelma),

- Shasta (Chasta).

The total estimated population of these tribes in 1850 was about 9,500. The French Canadian employees of the Hudson's Bay Company called them all "coquins", meaning "Rogues", where the designation Rogue River comes from.

After the Rogue River Wars in 1856, bands of the Rogue River Indians were split between the Confederated Tribes of Siletz Indians and the Confederated Tribes of the Grand Ronde Community of Oregon, relocating to either the Siletz Reservation north of the tribe's traditional lands or to the Grand Ronde Community. Some of the tribal members were never captured and were forced to wander.
