= Tecumtum =

American Indian chief (died 1864)

- Tecumtum (aka Chief John), ca. 1863

Etch-Ka-Taw-Wah leader

Personal details
- Born: Date and location unknown
- Died: August 6, 1864 Fort Yamhill, Oregon
- Cause of death: Old age
- Children: At least four sons and two daughters
- Nickname(s): Chief John, Old John, Tyee John, Elk killer

Military service
- Battles/wars: Rogue River Wars

Chief Tecumtum (died 1864), was the chief of the Etch-ka-taw-wah band of Athabaskan Indians and a leader in the Rogue River Wars. He signed three treaties with the United States between 1851 and 1854.

== Biography ==
Tecumtum, whose name meant Elk-killer, was the chief of the Etch-ka-taw-wah Band of Athabaskan Indians who were the last to surrender in the Rogue River war in 1855–1856. He lived in Deer Creek in Illinois Valley. Prior to the Rogue River war, he signed three treaties with the US: the Treaty with the Rogue River in 1851, the Treaty with the Rogue River in 1853, and the Treaty with the Rogue River in 1854. The discovery of gold in this area led to high tensions between the white settlers and the native tribe. Tecumtum was one of the leaders of The Rogue River War and he and his soldiers were one of the last to surrender in summer 1856. Two years later, Tecumtum and his son were imprisoned in San Francisco for "allegedly plotting an uprising". In 1862, Tecumtum was released from prison thanks to an appeal from his daughters. Once he was out of jail, he moved back to Oregon to live on the Grand Ronde Reservation. He died of old age on June 6, 1864, at Fort Yamhill.

== Wars ==
The discovery of gold in Southwest Oregon in 1850 created an influx of people to the area, exacerbating the tensions between the existing Native and white populations. The biggest of the wars involving Chief John were the Rogue River Wars, a series of conflicts that began in 1851 when Captain Tichenor's crew killed around thirty Indians at Battle Rock. This war didn't start until 1855 but had ongoing engagements for years until eventually coming to a halt in 1856. Not long after the lynching in 1855 of one of Tecumtum's sons and another tribe member, Jacksonville volunteers massacred a Native American village. After this occurrence, Tecumtum, followed by his men, made their way into the mountains where they spent their time fighting with the whites for over a year. During this time of such violence, leading Tecumtum and his men to flee into the mountains, he still requested and wanted to live in peace with the whites; however Tecumtum knew that wasn't an option for him and his men. “That he would rather die fighting for his rights than to…have his people killed for nothing when ever it suited the caprice of some men to do so.” Recorded by a government official who spoke to Tecumtum. In the summer of 1856, the surrendering of Tecumtum and his men became apparent, then he and his people were forced to travel by foot 125 miles to the land they were forced to live upon, now called the Siletz Reservation. Tecumtum was also part of a battle known as the Battle of Big Meadows, but there is debate as to whether this battle was started by him and his group, or as a result of a failed truce between a group of Native Americans and a group of Euro-Americans.

== Cultural clashes ==
Tyee John was a Shasta chief who was faithful to the Table Rock Treaty. All the Indian agents regarded John as the most incredible and heroic chief in the Native history. But his life was never in peace. Chief John lived on Deer Creek near the Illinois valley, with his family, sons, and daughters. The first engagement between the whites and Chief John was in August 1856, when Lieutenant Burrell Griffin and his troops invaded an Indian village. The whites were simply overpowered and were forced to retreat. The major clash was with the gold miners who murdered Tecumtum's son and his fellow troop. This aroused Chief John's temper, moreover, the government refused to punish those criminals. Tecumtum and his people suffered through terrible invasions, injustice, and persecutions. Conflicts and tensions became more intense when the troops of Tipsu Tyee's band did violations such as thefts, burnings and killing two white settlers. Therefore, in the early 1854, the miners started attacking into the Deer Creek. The Shasta warrior led his people into the forest where they can hide and escape from the whites. The whites became strong after the California Volunteer Militia involved into the war. Colonel Buchanan and Captain Andrew Smith took parts against the Shasta leader in Rogue River War. In 1856, Tecumtum addressed Colonel Buchanan saying, "You are a great chief. So am I. This is my country; I was in it when those trees were very small, not higher than my head. My heart is sick with fighting, but I want to live in my country. If the white people are willing, I will go back to the Deer creek and live among them as I used to do. They can visit my camp, and I will visit theirs; but I will not lay down my arms and go with you on the reserve. I will fight. Good-by." Eventually, on the Coast Reservation, Over half of the Rogue Tribe was removed due to the Siletz Agency.
