= Schuman Collection =

Collection of musical instruments gathered by Jack and Dorinda Schuman

The Schuman Collection is an extensive collection of musical instruments gathered from all parts of the world by Jack and Dorinda Schuman. It comprises instruments from all classifications (string, wind, percussion) and from all eras of music history. The collection is set to go on display in the music building of Southern Oregon University in Ashland, Oregon, United States.

== History ==
Jack Schuman, a retired professor of art history at Washington State University, started his collection in 1954. While working as a librarian in San Diego, he purchased, for $400, an Austrian Mandola made in 1910 by the teacher of the niece of the Emperor Franz Josef. In the 1960s, Schuman began his graduate studies at the University of London. While in Europe, he visited many flea markets, auctions, and antique shows throughout Britain and Germany. He managed to find such items as a guitar from Naples and a Spanish harp from the 17th century. Eventually, Schuman branched out to other regions, such as Africa, Asia, and South America. From these parts of the world, he has found such rarities as an Indian Elephant Bell and a Burmese Royal Buddhist Harp.

The collection was originally offered to the University of Oregon. However, it was later decided that Southern Oregon University would house it based on issues of staffing and security maintenance.

== Instruments ==
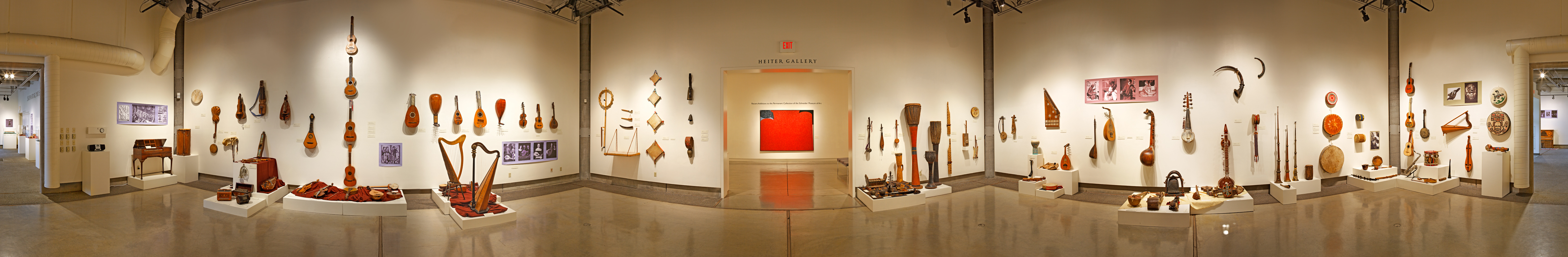

In total, Schuman's collection comprises 720 different instruments. The instruments span a wide range of continents and traditions, from European and American to Islamic, African, and Asian. Some include (to name a few): Thai Elephant Bell, American Civil War Banjo, French vielle à roue, Spanish Harp, 18th Century German Clavichord, Austrian Mandola, Moroccan Sossi Rabab (a type of guitar), Kissar (a type of harp from Mali).

== Plans and goals ==
Unlike many musical instrument collections, Schuman's will be made available for music students and faculty to play and use in the study of music history. Other goals for this collection include school tours and public viewing. It hopes to draw musicians and scholars to the Rogue Valley, as it is also intended to complement Shakespeare studies programs at Southern Oregon University and the Oregon Shakespeare Festival.

- Darling, John. "Noteworthy Gift: Collector Donates Instruments to SOU." Medford Mail Tribune November 5, 2006
- Schuman Collection of Musical Instruments, History.

== See also ==
- List of music museums
