= Battle of Big Bend =

Last major battle of the Rogue River Wars, in the US

- Part of The Rogue River Wars
Date	May 27–28, 1856
Location	near present-day Agness, Oregon, United States
Result	United States Victory; Conclusion of the Rogue River Wars

Belligerents
United States	Rogue River Indians

Commanders and leaders
Andrew Jackson Smith (C Company); Lt. Nelson B. Sweitzer (E Company); Captain Christopher C. Augur (G Company)	Chief John

Units involved
United States Army: 1st Cavalry Regiment; C Company; 4th Infantry Regiment; E Company; G Company	

Strength
C Company: 66 enlisted men One Army Surgeon; One civilian guide E Company: 30 enlisted men G Company: 54 enlisted men	150 Native Americans (est.)

Casualties and losses
10 killed 17 wounded	unknown killed or wounded 185 surrendered

The Battle of Big Bend was the last major battle of the Rogue River Wars. It began on May 27, 1856, and ended on May 28, 1856. The battle was fought along the Rogue River, eight miles upriver from Agness, Oregon. "The battle was fought between one reinforced Army company; Company "C", 1st Dragoons, and a large group of Indians from many different bands. Captain Andrew Jackson Smith was the commanding officer of Company "C" during the battle, and Chief John, a member of the Dakubetede Indian band, lead all the warriors."

Under Smith's Command were 66 enlisted men from Company "C" of the 1st Cavalry Regiment, 30 enlisted men from Company "E" of the 4th Infantry Regiment, and 54 enlisted men from Company "G" of the 4th Infantry Regiment. The orders of the G Company were to accompany Smith's forces to Big Bend and then return to Oak Flat on the Illinois River.

== Battle ==
On the morning of the 27th, several Natives came to Smith's camp at Big Bend and alerted them that more Natives were on the way. Later that morning, a group of armed Natives formed outside the camp. Upon realizing that much of the growing group were followers of Chief John, Smith placed his entire command under arms.

The first shots of the battle were fired at around 11:00am by the Natives. The attackers led a consistent assault throughout the day on Smith's position on the high ground. By the night of the 27th, US troops had suffered four killed and 15 wounded.

At about 4:00am the next morning, the firing resumed when Natives noticed US troop movements as they attempted to improve their defensive positions. Shooting continued for the next 12 hours. at 4:00pm, Captain Augur's forces from Company "G" arrived at the battle and attacked Native positions, pushing them back. Smith then commanded Sweitzer's forces from Company "E" to assault Native positions as well.

On the night of the 28th, Natives began to surrender to the US Army. By the 30th of May, 185 Natives had surrendered at Big Bend.

== Aftermath ==
The Battle of Big Bend left a total of 10 US troops dead and 17 wounded. Seven of the deaths were from Company "C", one from Company "E", and two from Company "G". Of the 17 wounded, 9 came from Company "C", 5 from Company "E", and 3 from Company "G". The number of Native casualties remains unknown as the dead and wounded were taken from the battlefield.

The Army victory at Big Bend brought an end to the hostilities in the Rogue River Valley, with all of the natives being moved from southwest Oregon to the Siletz Indian Reservations during June and July 1856.
