= Janet Reed =

American dancer

- Born: September 15, 1916; Tolo, Oregon, United States
- Died: February 28, 2000 (aged 83); Seattle, Washington, United States
- Education: Lincoln High School
- Occupations: Ballerina; Ballet mistress
- Years active: 1937–1964
- Spouse: Branson Erskine (m. 1946–1994)
- Children: 2

Janet Reed (September 15, 1916 – February 28, 2000) was an American ballerina and ballet mistress. She danced with San Francisco Ballet from 1937 to 1941 as leading ballerina.

Reed worked with Ballet Theatre from 1943 to 1947 and then with New York City Ballet from 1948 until she was made its ballet mistress in 1959, helping dancers to improve their technique.

After retiring in 1964 to spend more time with her family, she taught danced and helped in founding Pacific Northwest Dance, where she worked as its first artistic director until 1976.

== Biography ==
Reed was born in Tolo, Oregon, on September 15, 1916, and is the descent of pioneers from Oregon. Her father, Charles Lindsay Reed, was an amateur dancer and rancher, and her mother, Esther Smith Reed, was a beautician.

She began studying dance with Eve Benson and Isadora Moldovan a few miles northwest in Medford, Oregon, as a girl. When in grade school, Reed moved to Portland, and received professional training mainly from Willam Christensen.

After she graduated Lincoln High School in 1937, she joined one of Christensen's dancing groups in San Francisco in Northern California. Reed danced with the San Francisco Ballet as leading ballerina from 1937 to 1941, dancing Odette-Odile,[the hardest ballet role] in its first full-length production of Swan Lake in 1940. She toured the West and Midwestern United States, introducing ballets to new audiences.

In 1942, Reed relocated to New York City because she was keen to learn repertoire and moves. She worked with choreographer Eugene Loring, who attracted her to New York City with a contract as Dance Players' principal dancer. The group disbanded not long after, and Reed performed with pickup groups and teaching dance in a studio above Apollo Theater in Harlem to earn money.

She joined the Ballet Theatre in 1943, remaining with the company until 1947. Reed worked with choreographers Agnes de Mille, George Balanchine, Michael Kidd, and Antony Tudor, touring North America. She was cast as the Second Passerby in Jerome Robbins' maiden ballet Fancy Free in 1944. Reed danced in the premiere of Interplay in 1945, and appeared in Kidd and Tudor's On Stage the following year and then in Robbins' Broadway play Look Ma, I'm Dancing in 1948.

That same year, she joined the New York City Ballet (NYCB), after accepting an invitation from Balanchine. Reed was cast by Balanchine in Neo-Classical ballets, such as Symphony in C and Serenade, and created the final act of Bourrée Fantasque for her.

In the 1953 revival of Lew Christensen's Filling Station, she portrayed a gas station attendant opposite Jacques d'Amboise. The following year, Reed was cast as the courtesan in Con Amore and the dance-hall girl in Western Symphony. She also had roles in Robbins' The Pied Piper, The Unicorn and The Manticore from John Butler, and Tally-Ho, Undertow, Dim Lustre, Waltz Academy, Pillar of Fire, Gala Performance, Graduation Ball, Mademoiselle Angot, Blue Beard, Pas de Quatre, Three Virgins and a Devil, Judgment of Paris, Ivesiana and Western Symphony.

Reed was made NYCB's ballet mistress 1959, helping dancers such as Allegra Kent, Patricia McBride, Edward Villella, and Pacific Northwest Ballet founders Francia Russell and Kent Stowell improve their technique. Reed left the NYCB in 1964, retiring from performing dance to spend more time with her family.

She taught at Bard College, Annandale-on-Hudson, New York, and then founded a school in the Hudson Valley. Reed was a United States Cultural Exchange Programs consultant recommending companies to represent American dance abroad. She moved to Seattle in 1974 to assist in the founding of Pacific Northwest Dance (the precursor to Pacific Northwest Ballet) and becoming its inaugural artistic director.

Reed stayed at the company for the next two years, before resigning while experiencing declining health from overworking. She returned to teach at Pacific Northwest Dance not long after, remaining with the company until 1996.

== Personal life ==
Reed was married to antiques dealer and interior designer Branson Erskine from 1946 until his death in 1994. They had a son and a daughter. Reed died in Seattle on February 28, 2000, of a stroke she had had one week earlier. She was 83. A memorial service was held in her honor in April 2000.

== Legacy ==
Anna Kisselgoff of The New York Times described Reed as "A petite redhead", while Carole Beers of The Seattle Times noted the dancer as having "Piercing blue eyes". Encyclopædia Britannica wrote that she was noted for "Her charm, vivacity, and flair for comedy" and not solely on her skill, and in her entry in The Oregon Encyclopedia, Martha Ullman West said Reed's "Openness to new ideas, her pioneer work ethic, and her ability to reinvent herself in a variety of roles made her an ideal instrument for the choreographic creators of American ballet."
