= Rogue River Wars =

1855-56 conflict between Native American tribes and U.S. soldiers and settlers in Oregon

Rogue River War
- Part of American Indian Wars
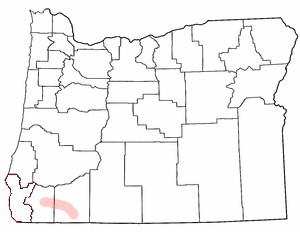
- Rogue River Valley in the state of Oregon
Date	October 8, 1855 to June, 1856
Location	Southern Oregon, United States
Result	United States Victory

Belligerents
United States; U.S. Army local militias and volunteers	Rogue River Indians

Commanders and leaders
Andrew Jackson Smith; Robert C. Buchanan	Tecumtum

Casualties and losses
33 volunteers killed 17 regulars killed 44 civilians killed	Around 100+ killed

The Rogue River Wars were an armed conflict in 1855–1856 between the U.S. Army, local militias and volunteers, and the Native American tribes commonly grouped under the designation of Rogue River Indians, in the Rogue Valley area of what today is southern Oregon. The conflict designation usually includes only the hostilities that took place during 1855–1856, but there had been numerous previous skirmishes, as early as the 1830s, between European American settlers and the Native Americans, over territory and resources.

Following the conclusion of the war, the United States forcibly removed the Tolowa and other tribes to reservations in Oregon and California.

In central coastal Oregon, the Tillamook, Siletz, and about 20 other tribes were placed with Tolowa at the Coast Indian Reservation. It is now known as the Siletz Reservation, located on land along the Siletz River in the Central Coastal Range, about 15 miles northeast of Newport, Oregon. While the tribes originally spoke 10 distinct languages here, the surviving native language in the 21st century is Siletz Dee-ni, an Athabaskan language related to Tolowa.

== History ==
=== Background ===
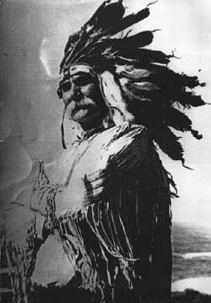
Hoxie Simmons, a Rogue River Indian, c. 1870

The interaction of the Rogue River Indians and the first European-American settlers traveling through the area was relatively peaceful. However, the situation changed drastically with the opening of the Oregon Trail and the gold rushes in northern California and later in eastern Oregon. Larger groups of settlers and miners entered the area, consuming without restrictions the natural resources on which the Indians relied for survival, competing for game and fish, and chopping down entire forests of oak trees.

The first recorded hostilities were caused by the American Ewing Young's travel to Oregon in 1834. His party murdered several natives and buried their bodies on the island where the party was camped. These bodies were later discovered by the local tribe. They retaliated the next year, attacking an American fur trapping party that passed through. Four of the eight European-Americans were killed; William J. Bailey and George Gay were two survivors.

In 1837, as part of the Willamette Cattle Company, Bailey, Gay and others were herding cattle north to the Willamette Valley when Gay shot and killed a native boy in revenge for earlier attacks against whites. The local Indians raided the cattle drive, but killed or drove off only a few cattle.

=== Cultural conflict ===
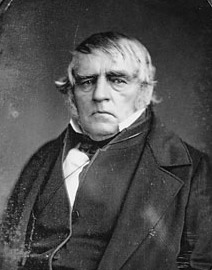
Peter Skene Ogden encountered inland Rogue River natives in 1827.

The first known contact between these groups of indigenous people and Europeans occurred when British explorer George Vancouver anchored off Cape Blanco, about 30 miles (48 km) north of the mouth of the Rogue River, and native people visited the ship in canoes. In 1826, Alexander Roderick McLeod of the Hudson's Bay Company (HBC) led an overland expedition from HBC's regional headquarters in Fort Vancouver to as far south as the Rogue.

In 1827, an HBC expedition led by Peter Skene Ogden made the first direct contact between the European and the inland Rogue River inhabitants when he crossed the Siskiyou Mountains to look for beaver for the fur trade. Friction between indigenous tribes and Europeans were relatively minor during these early encounters. In 1834, however, an HBC expedition led by Michel Laframboise was reported to have murdered 11 Rogue River natives, and shortly thereafter a party led by an American trapper, Ewing Young, shot and killed at least two more.

The name Rogue River was apparently derived from French fur trappers, who called the river La Riviere aux Coquins, because they regarded the natives as rogues (coquins).

The number of European settlers entering the Rogue River watershed greatly increased after 1846, when a party of 15 men led by Jesse Applegate developed a southern alternative to the Oregon Trail; the new trail was used by emigrants headed for the Willamette Valley. Later called the Applegate Trail, it passed through the Rogue and Bear Creek valleys and crossed the Cascade Range between present-day Ashland and south of Upper Klamath Lake. From 90 to 100 wagons and 450 to 500 emigrants used the new trail later in 1846, passing through Rogue tribe's homelands between the headwaters of Bear Creek and the future site of Grants Pass and crossing the Rogue about 4.5 miles (7.2 km) downstream of it. Despite fears on both sides, violence in the watershed in the 1830s and 1840s was limited; "Indian seemed interested in speeding whites on their way, and they were happy to get through the region without being attacked."

In 1847, the Whitman massacre and the Cayuse War in what became southeastern Washington raised fears among European settlers throughout the region. They formed large volunteer militias to fight indigenous people. Tensions intensified among the settlers passing through the Rogue River Valley in 1848 at the start of the California Gold Rush, when hundreds of men from the Oregon Territory passed through the Rogue Valley on their way to the Sacramento River basin. After native people attacked a group of miners returning along the Rogue in 1850, former territorial governor Joseph Lane negotiated a peace treaty with Apserkahar, a leader of the Takelma. It promised protection of Indigenous rights and safe passage through the Rogue Valley for European miners and settlers. (see also: Battle of Evans Creek)

=== Mining in the Rogue River valley ===
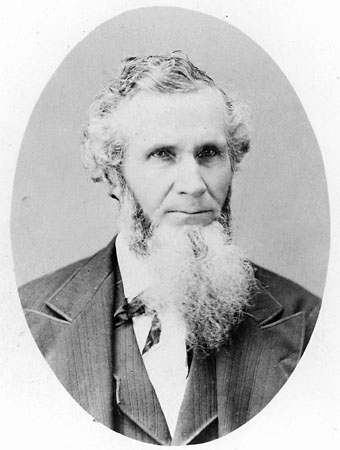
Joel Palmer, Oregon Superintendent of Indian Affairs

Miners began prospecting for gold in the watershed, including a Bear Creek tributary called Jackson Creek, where they established a mining camp in 1851 at the site of what later became Jacksonville. Indian attacks on miners that year led to U.S. Army intervention and fighting near Table Rock between Indians and the combined forces of professional soldiers and volunteer miner militias. John P. Gaines, the new territorial governor, negotiated a new treaty with some but not all of the Indian bands, removing them from Bear Creek and other tributaries on the south side of the main stem. At about the same time, more white emigrants, including families with women and children, were settling in the region. By 1852, about 28 donation land claims had been filed in the Rogue Valley.

Further clashes in 1853 led to the Table Rock Treaty with the Rogue River tribe that established the Table Rock Indian Reservation across the river from the federal Fort Lane. As the white population increased and Indian losses of land, food sources, and personal safety mounted, bouts of violence upstream and down continued through 1854–1855.

=== War ===
In 1855, this friction culminated in open conflict, which lasted into 1856, and is now called the Rogue River War. The Guide to the Cayuse, Yakima, and Rogue River Wars Papers 1847–1858 at the University of Oregon summarizes the war as follows:

Throughout the 1850s, Governor Stevens of the Washington Territory clashed with the U.S. Army over Indian policy: Stevens wanted to displace Indians and take their land, but the army opposed land grabs. White settlers in the Rogue River area began to attack Indian villages, and Captain Smith, commandant of Fort Lane, often interposed his men between the Indians and the settlers. In October 1855, he took Indian women and children into the fort for their own safety; but a mob of settlers raided their village, killing 27 Indians. The Indians killed 27 settlers expecting to settle the score, but the settlers continued to attack Indian camps through the winter. On May 27, 1856, Captain Smith arranged the surrender of the Indians to the US Army, but the Indians attacked the soldiers instead. The commander fought the Indians until reinforcements arrived the next day; the Indians retreated. A month later, they surrendered and were sent to reservations.

Suffering from cold, hunger, and disease on the Table Rock Reservation, a group of Takelma returned to their old village at the mouth of Little Butte Creek in October 1855. After a volunteer militia attacked them, killing 23 men, women, and children, they fled downriver, attacking whites from Gold Hill to Galice Creek. A group of Takelma Indians attacked the fortified home of William B. Hay, also known as Fort Hay, on March 23, 1856. The battle raged throughout the day, and the Indians retreated just before troops under Major Bruce arrived from Fort Vannoy in the morning. 2 days later, troops under Major Bruce clashed with Indians at 8 Dollar Mountain to the South-East of Fort Hay. At the Battle of Big Bend, The Indians were confronted by volunteers and regular army troops, and at first repulsed them; however, after nearly 200 volunteers launched an all-day assault on the remaining natives, the war ended at right there (at RM 35 or RK 56) on the lower river. By then, fighting had also ended near the coast, where, before retreating upstream, a separate group of natives had killed about 30 whites and burned their cabins near what later became Gold Beach.

Most of the Rogue River Indians were removed in 1856 to reservations further north. About 1,400 were sent to the Coast Reservation in central Oregon, later renamed the Siletz Reservation. They were placed with other Indians who were from Coastal Salish tribes, such as the Tillamook, the Siletz, and the Clatsop. To protect 400 natives still in danger of attack at Table Rock, Joel Palmer, the Oregon Superintendent of Indian Affairs, ordered their removal to the newly established Grande Ronde Reservation in Yamhill County, Oregon.

=== Massacre at Hungry Hill ===
The Massacre at Hungry Hill, also known as the Battle of Grave Creek Hills or Battle of Bloody Springs, was the largest massacre of the Rogue River Wars. It occurred on October 31, 1855. The Native Americans were camped on the top of a hill, with the soldiers located across a narrow ravine about 1,500 feet deep. Two hundred of the Native Americans were in the mountains southwest of present-day Roseburg armed with muzzleloaders, bows, and arrows and managed to hold off a group of "more than 300 ... dragoons, militiamen and volunteers".

== See also ==
- Cayuse War
- Table Rock Indian Reservation
- Upper and Lower Table Rock
- The Battle of Rogue River
- Battle of Big Bend
