= Battle of Hungry Hill =

Largest battle of the Rogue River Wars, in the US

- Part of American Indian Wars and Rogue River Wars
Date	October 31, 1855
Location	near Wolf Creek, Oregon, United States
Result	Native American Victory

Belligerents
Rogue River Indians	United States

Commanders and leaders
Chief George	

Strength
200 Native Americans (including non-combatants)	100 US Army dragoons 200 Militia

Casualties and losses
less than 20 killed or wounded	Army: 4 killed 7 wounded Militia: 7 killed 20 wounded

The Battle of Hungry Hill, also known as the Battle of Grave Creek Hills or Battle of Bloody Springs, was the largest battle of the Rogue River Wars. It occurred on October 31, 1855. The Native Americans (men, women and children) were camped on the top of a hill, with the soldiers located across a narrow ravine about 1,500 feet deep. Two hundred of the Native Americans were in the mountains southwest of present-day Roseburg armed with muzzleloaders, bows, and arrows and managed to hold off a group of "more than 300 ... dragoons, militiamen and volunteers".

== Battle ==
The U.S. troops had planned a surprise attack, but their position was given away by a warming fire. Seeing that they had been discovered, the soldiers attempted to charge down the ravine and up the other side, but were thwarted, as the Native Americans had good cover in the high ground, and many proved to be good marksmen. "U.S. troops and militiamen retreated out of the mountains ... As many as 36 were dead, missing or severely wounded. Native casualties numbered fewer than 20."

== Location ==
In 2012, the location of the Battle of Hungry Hill was discovered by archeologists from Southern Oregon University's Laboratory of Anthropology. Mark Tveskov, who discovered the site using metal detectors, states that although this battle involving 500 people was a "major defeat" for U.S. troops, it is not well known. He attributes this in part to "the disappointment and blame among militiamen and Army regulars over the defeat. Back then, Oregon telegraph cables were in their infancy, and photographers who would document the Civil War several years later were not on hand. If Hungry Hill had happened after the Civil War, it would have been front-page news in the New York Times."
