= Frances Johnson =

Last fluent speaker of the Takelma language (died 1934)

Frances Johnson (1835–1934) was the last living fluent speaker of the Takelma language of Oregon, United States. While living on the Siletz Reservation, during the summer of 1906 she worked for six weeks as language consultant with linguist Edward Sapir to document the language. Sapir gives her Takelma name as Gwísgwashãn (phonemically Kʷìskʷasá:n, possibly derived from kʷìskʷas "chipmunk").

Sapir reports that in 1906, "the number of individuals that can be said to have anything like a fluent speaking knowledge of [Takelma] is quite inconsiderable, barely more than a handful in fact." He describes Johnson as "an elderly full-blood Takelma woman", born in a village called Takʰts'asín or Taltaníkʰ, located near Jump Off Joe Creek (Ti:p'o:lts'ìlta) in Oregon. Her mother came from a village on the upper course of Cow creek. Sapir comments that he found her "an exceptionally intelligent and good-humored informant".

The cooperation between Johnson and Sapir produced the two central publications on the Takelma language, a collection of texts with English translations and wordlist and a grammatical description. These two sources contain a rich amount of data, and as a result Takelma can be considered a well-documented language.

During the late 1850s, Johnson lived together with Philip Sheridan during part of his tour of duty in the then Oregon Territory.

== See also ==
- Takelma language
- Takelma people

== Cited works ==
- Achen, Paris (Jan 11, 2008). "Pair breathe life into dead language". Mail Tribune. Archived from the original on July 31, 2013.
- Gilliam, Martha Elizabeth; Lockley, Fred (1916). "Reminiscences of Mrs. Frank Collins, nee Martha Elizabeth Gilliam". The Quarterly of the Oregon Historical Society. 17 (4). Portland, Oregon: Oregon Historical Society: 358–372. ISSN 2153-1706. JSTOR 20610053. This article incorporates text from this source, which is in the public domain.
- Sapir, Edward (1907). "Notes on the Takelma Indians of Southwestern Oregon". American Anthropologist. 9 (2): 251–275. doi:10.1525/aa.1907.9.2.02a00010. JSTOR 659586.
- Sapir, Edward (1909). Takelma Texts. Anthropological Publications of the University Museum. Vol. 2. Philadelphia: University of Pennsylvania.
- Sapir, Edward (1912). The Takelma Language of Southwestern Oregon. Washington, D.C.: Government Printing Office.
