= Taowhywee Point =

Coordinates: 42°15′24″N 122°41′32″W

Taowhywee Point is a summit in the U.S. state of Oregon. The elevation is 3,707 feet (1,130 m).

Taowhywee is a name derived from the Takelma language meaning "morning star". It was the Indian name of Margaret Tao-Why-Wee Harney (1807-1893), a medicine woman of the Confederated Tribes of Siletz.
