= Table Rock Indian Reservation =

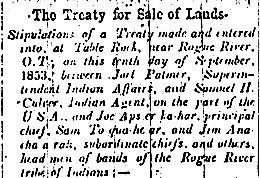
"The Treaty for Sale of Lands", a news article published in the Oregon Statesman on September 27, 1853

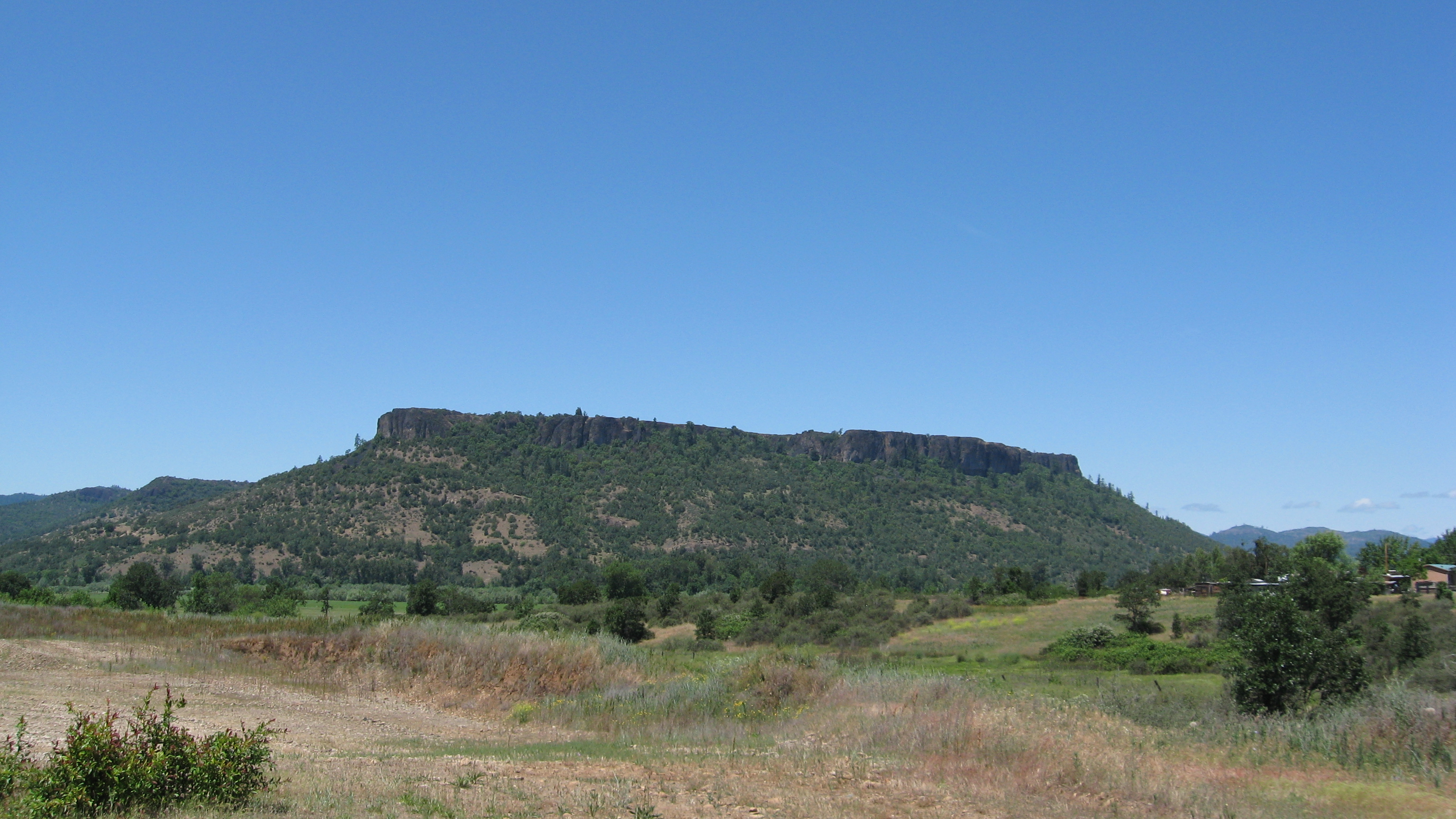
Lower Table Rock

Table Rock Reservation was a short-lived Indian reservation north of the Rogue River in Oregon, United States. It was established by treaty with the Rogue River Indians in 1853. The Reservation was abandoned on February 22 while the tribes were walked overland to Grand Ronde Reservation, and they arrived on March 25, 1856. The Rogue River War continued into June 1856. The reservation was in Southern Oregon, between Upper Table Rock and Evans Creek.

In 2025, the Confederated Tribes of Siletz Indians announced the purchase of approximately 2,000 acres of privately owned property within the original Table Rock Reserve in southern Oregon.

== History ==
Conflicts between miners and Rogue River Indians began in the early 1850s, when gold was discovered in what is now Oregon. This conflict turned into open warfare and several treaties were signed in an attempt to end the hostilities resulting in the Native Americans ceding their land. They were moved to Table Rock Reservation before being moved to the Grand Ronde Reservation and the Coast Reservation (a small fraction of which is now the Siletz Reservation).

Native Americans lost most of the Bear Creek Valley in exchange for the Table Rock Reservation. In October 1855, a lack of food, a cold winter, and disease devastated the families on the reservation, so a group of Takelma Indians returned to their old village at the mouth of Little Butte Creek on the upper Rogue River. A volunteer militia then attacked them, killing 23 including women and children. A small group responded to this dire situation by fleeing to the Rogue River Canyon, attacking miners and settlers from Evans Creek to Galice Creek on the way. The militia and regular army troops caught up with them in the Grave Creek Hills, and the Indians inflicted heavy casualties on the poorly trained troops. What became known as the Battle of Hungry Hill was a major victory for the Indians. In November, the militia and army again attacked, and again were defeated. The attack was meant to be a surprise, but the Native Americans heard them chopping trees to build rafts and were prepared.

Several more battles were then fought. In the spring of 1856, a force of nearly 200 volunteers arrived at the mouth of Ditch Creek on the Rogue River, and fired on the Indians' settlement on the far shore. Up to 30 Indians were killed during the day-long assault, forcing the survivors to surrender. In the summer and following winter, licensed hunters killed and captured Indians who remained in the area.

In the February-March 1856, 391 Indians were marched from Table Rock 200 miles (320 km) north to the new Grand Ronde Reservation in Yamhill County. The survivors of the Battle of Hungry Hill were loaded onto a steamboat at Port Orford, Oregon then transported via the Columbia River and Willamette River to the Grand Ronde Reservation. They remained at Grand Ronde for almost a year when most were moved to the Siletz Agency in May 1857.

In 2025, the Confederated Tribes of Siletz Indians announced the purchase of approximately 2,000 acres of privately owned property within the original Table Rock Reserve in southern Oregon.

"This is a historic moment that reconnects the Siletz Tribe to its ancestors, history and treaties signed near Table Rock. It is a great honor to return this special land to Indian stewardship," said Delores Pigsley, chairman of the Siletz Tribe.

== See also ==
- Upper and Lower Table Rock
