= Takelma =

Native American people in Oregon, U.S.

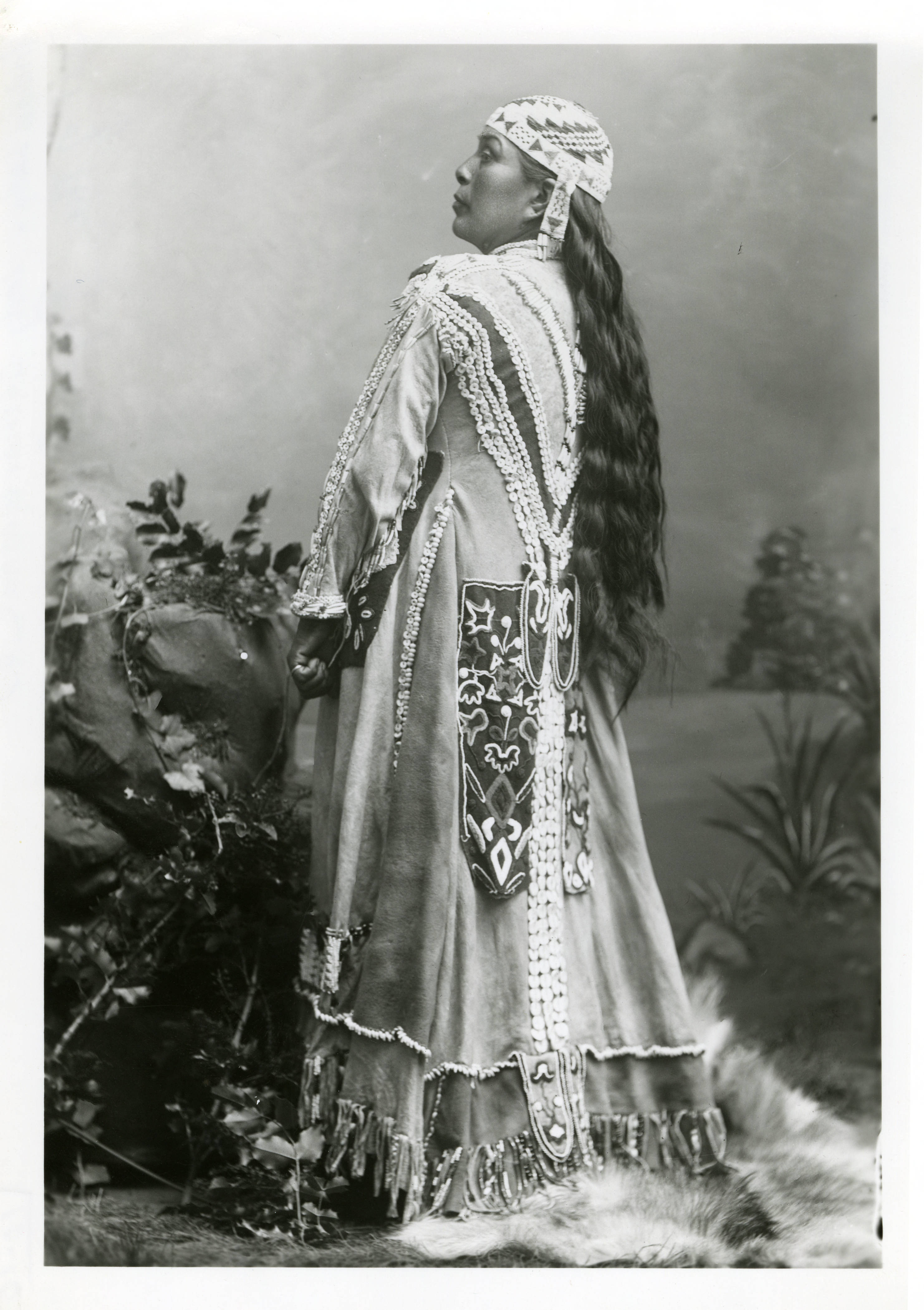
- Jennie (Takelma), who crafted the dress worn in this iconic Peter Britt portrait

Total population
- merged into Confederated Tribes of Siletz Indians of Oregon and Confederated Tribes of the Grand Ronde Community of Oregon

Regions with significant populations
- Southwestern Oregon

Languages
- Takelma language

Religion
- Indigenous religion

Related ethnic groups
- other Rogue River Indians

The Takelma are a Native American people who originally lived in the Rogue Valley of interior southwestern Oregon. Most of their villages were sited along the Rogue River. They spoke the Takelma language, which is a linguistic isolate.

== Name ==
The name Takelma means "(Those) Along the River". Taklema is also spelled Dagelma.

== History ==
=== 19th century ===
Much less is known about the lifeways of the Takelma than about their neighbors in other parts of Oregon and northern California. Their homeland was settled by Euroamericans late in the history of the American Frontier, because the surrounding mountainous country protected it. But once colonization began, it proceeded rapidly. The discovery of gold spurred the first white settlement of the region in 1852. The Takelma who survived were sent to reservations in 1856. Settlers and Natives lived in the region together for less than four years.

Because Takelma territory included the most agriculturally attractive part of the Rogue Valley, particularly along the Rogue River itself, their valuable land was preferentially seized and settled by Euroamerican settlers in the mid-19th century. Almost without exception, these newcomers had little or no interest in learning about their indigenous neighbors, and they considered them a dangerous nuisance. They recorded little about the Takelma, beyond documenting their own perspective on conflicts. Native Americans living near the Takelma but on more marginal and rugged land, such as the Shastan and Rogue River Athabascan peoples, survived the colonization period with their cultures and languages more intact.

Conflicts between the settlers and the Indigenous peoples of both coastal and interior southwest Oregon escalated and became known as the Rogue River Wars. Nathan Douthit examined peaceful encounters between the whites and southern Oregon Indians, encounters he describes as "middle-ground" interactions, undertaken by "cultural intermediaries." Douthit argues that without such "middle-ground" contact, the Takelma and other southern Oregon Indians would have been exterminated rather than relocated.

In 1856, the U.S. government forcibly relocated the Takelma who survived the Rogue Indian Wars to the Coast Indian Reservation (today the Siletz Reservation) on the rainy northern Oregon coast, an environment much different from the dry oak and chaparral country that they knew. Many died on the way to the Siletz Reservation and the Grand Ronde Indian Reservation, which now exists as Confederated Tribes of the Grand Ronde Community of Oregon. And many died on the reservations from disease, despair and inadequate diet. Indian agents taught the surviving Takelma farming skills and discouraged them from speaking their own language, believing that their best chance for productive lives depended on their learning useful skills and the English language. On the reservations, the Takelma lived with Native Americans from different cultures; and their intermarriage with people of other cultures, both on and off the reservation, worked against the transmission of Takelma language and culture to Takelman descendants.

=== 20th century ===
The Takelma spent many years in exile before anthropologists began to interview them and record information about their language and lifeways. Linguists Edward Sapir and John Peabody Harrington worked with Takelma descendants.

In the late 1980s, Agnes Baker Pilgrim, granddaughter of Takelma chief George Harney, emerged as the most significant spokesperson for the Takelma.

"In 1994, on the banks of the Applegate, the Takelma people performed a Sacred Salmon Ceremony for the first time in a century and a half ... Another endeavor, the Takelma Intertribal Project, starting in 2000, has worked to restore edible, medicinal, and basketry plants through traditional techniques of burning and pruning."

In the 2010 census, 16 people claimed Takelma ancestry, 5 of them full-blooded.

=== 21st century ===
Takelma descendants are enrolled citizens of the Confederated Tribes of Siletz Indians of Oregon and Confederated Tribes of the Grand Ronde Community of Oregon.

== Culture ==
=== Environment and adaptation ===
The Takelman people lived as foragers, a term that many anthropologists consider more exact than hunter-gatherers. They collected plant foods and insects, fished and hunted. The Takelma cultivated only one crop, a native tobacco (Nicotiana biglovii). The Takelma lived in small bands of related men and their families. Interior southwest Oregon has pronounced seasons, and the ancient Takelma adapted to these seasons by spending spring, summer, and early fall months collecting and storing food for the winter season. The Rogue River, around which their villages nucleated, provided them with salmon and other fish. Ancient salmon runs were reputedly large. The intensive and coordinated labor involved in large-scale capture of salmon with nets and spears by men, and their cleaning and drying by women, provided the Takelma with an excellent, protein-rich diet for much of the year, if the salmon runs were good. The salmon diet was supplemented, or replaced in years of poor salmon runs, by game such as deer, elk, beaver, bear, antelope, and bighorn sheep. (The last two species are now locally extinct.) Smaller mammals, such as squirrels, rabbits and gophers, might be snared by either men or women. Yellowjacket larvae and grasshoppers also provided calories.

The limiting factor in the Takelma diet was carbohydrates, since fish and game provided abundant fat and protein. To get the carbohydrates and vitamins needed for good health, the Takelma collected a variety of plant foods. However, consistent with optimal foraging theory, which suggests that humans, like other creatures, decide what foods to eat depending on what gives the greatest nutritional value for the work expended to get it, the Takelma strategically focused on two plant foods: acorns and camas, also known as camassia. They harvested acorns from the two species of oaks in their Rogue Valley territory, Oregon white oak and California black oak. When these foods were not available, or for variety in their diet, Takelma women also gathered and processed the seeds of native grasses and tarweed (Madia elegans), dug roots and collected small fruits.

=== Architecture ===
Historically, during the winter months, the Takelma lived in semi-subterranean homes dug partly into the insulating earth with superstructures built of vertically placed sugar pine planks. Poorer people also lived in pole-and-bark dwellings, well banked with earth and dry leaves for insulation. Typically the planks rested on two 6-foot-tall vertical shafts that supported a horizontal central pole. Beds of cat-tail mats were placed adjacent to the fire pit, with openings in the roof to allow for ventilation. Takelma homes bore structural similarities to the semi-subterranean homes of the Klamath and Modoc peoples to the east, who spoke languages in the Plateau Penutian family, and to those of the Shasta to the south, who spoke various Shastan languages (which may be part of the hypothetical Hokan family). One historical account describes a rectangular, plank structure large enough to hold 100 people, but archaeologists in the region have typically found remains of much smaller dwellings. During the warmer months of summer Takelma lived in residences made of brush or forwent them altogether.

== Notable Takelma ==
- Agnes Baker Pilgrim, traditionalist

== See also ==
- Latgawa
- Takelma language
- Frances Johnson
- Takilma, Oregon
- The US Navy "USS Takelma", now the ARA Suboficial Castillo (A-6), a patrol boat of the Argentine Navy

== Bibliography ==
- Beckham, Stephen Dow (1996), Requiem for a People: The Rogue Indians and the Frontiersmen, Corvallis: Oregon State University Press, ISBN 0-87071-521-6
- Campell, Lyle (1997), American Indian languages: The historical linguistics of Native America, New York: Oxford University Press, ISBN 0-19-509427-1
- Douthit, Nathan (2002), Uncertain Encounters: Indians and Whites at Peace and War in Southern Oregon 1820s-1860s, New York: Oregon State University Press, ISBN 0-87071-549-6
- Hannon, Nan (1990), Hannon, Nan; Olmo, Richard K. (eds.), "An Underview of Southwest Oregon", Living with the Land: The Indians of Southwest Oregon, Medford, Oregon: Southern Oregon Historical Society Press
- Goddard, Ives, ed. (1996), Languages, Handbook of North American Indians, vol. 17, Washington, D. C.: Smithsonian Institution, ISBN 0-16-048774-9
- Gray, Dennis J. (1987), The Takelmas and Their Athapascan Neighbors: A New Ethnographic Synthesis for the Upper Rogue River Area of Southwestern Oregon, University of Oregon Anthropological Papers, Eugene, Oregon: University of Oregon Press
- LaLande, Jeff (1987), First Over the Siskiyous: Peter Skene Ogden's 1826-1827 Journey through the Oregon-California Borderlands, Portland, Oregon: Oregon Historical Society Press
- LaLande, Jeff (1990), "The Indians of Southwest Oregon: An Ethnohistorical Review", Living with the Land: The Indians of Southwest Oregon, Medford, Oregon: Southern Oregon Historical Society, ISBN 0-943388-08-2
- Mithun, Marianne (1999), The languages of Native North America, Cambridge: Cambridge University Press Press, ISBN 0-521-23228-7
- Sapir, Edward (1907), Notes on the Takelema Indians of Southwestern Oregon, American Anthropologist New Series, vol. 9, Washington, D.C.: American Anthropological Association, pp. 251–275
- Sapir, Edward (1909), Takelema Texts, Anthropological Publications of the University Museum, vol. 2, Washington, D.C.: University of Pennsylvania Press, pp. 34–42
- Sapir, Edward (1922), "The Takelma Language of Southwest Oregon", in Boas, Franz (ed.), Handbook of American Indian Languages: Part 2, Washington, D.C.: Government Printing Office Press, pp. 1–296
