= Smoke Signals (newspaper) =

Weekly newspaper published in Grand Ronde, Oregon

- Type: Bimonthly Newspaper
- Format: Tabloid
- Founder: Greg Archuleta
- Publisher: Confederated Tribes of Grand Ronde
- Editor: Danielle Harrison
- Founded: 1978
- Headquarters: Grand Ronde, Oregon
- Website: smokesignals.org

Smoke Signals is a newspaper published by the Confederated Tribes of Grand Ronde in the U.S. state of Oregon since the late 1970s.

== History ==
The publication was launched by Greg Archuleta in or before 1978, initially as a single or multiple sheet, monthly newsletter mailed to tribal members. In April 1987 it adopted a tabloid format on traditional newsprint. In 1995 it began publishing twice month.

Smoke Signals' coverage has been cited in news publications and the academic press. A 1999 Associated Press story quoted Smoke Signals on the topic of non-natives seeking to join the Confederated Tribes of Grand Ronde. In 2000 Smoke Signals' coverage of recovering Native American remains was quoted. In 2002 editor Brent Merrill was highlighted in an Oregonian article for his walk to commemorate the Trail of Tears. A 2005 Oregonian story quoted Smoke Signals' editor on the propriety of using Indian-related terms and slurs in naming sports teams. A 2018 newspaper article published in Texas noted Smoke Signals' name as an example of creative naming to tie a newspaper to its local community.

== Awards ==
Smoke Signals has won several honors, including the General Excellence award, from the Native American Journalists Association, as well as from the Oregon Newspaper Publishers Association. In 2017 the Confederated Tribes of Grand Ronde adopted an Independent Press Ordinance, establishing an editorial board for Smoke Signals that would remove direct oversight by the Confederated Tribes. It won the Elias Boudinot Free Press Award that year. In 2020 it won second place awards from the Oregon Newspaper Publishers Association in the categories of general excellence, news writing, and photography.
