= Takelma language =

Extinct Native American language formerly spoken in Oregon

Takelma
- Ta:kɛlmàʔn
- Native to: United States
- Region: Oregon, Rogue Valley along the middle course of the Rogue River
- Ethnicity: Takelma, Latgawa, Cow Creek band of Upper Umpqua
- Extinct: 1934, with the death of Frances Johnson
- Revival: Cow Creek band of Umpqua tribe has a small group of L2 speakers
- Language family: Language isolate
- Dialects: Lower; Upper (Latgawa); Takelma B; Takelma H

Language codes
- ISO 639-3: tkm
- Glottolog: take1257
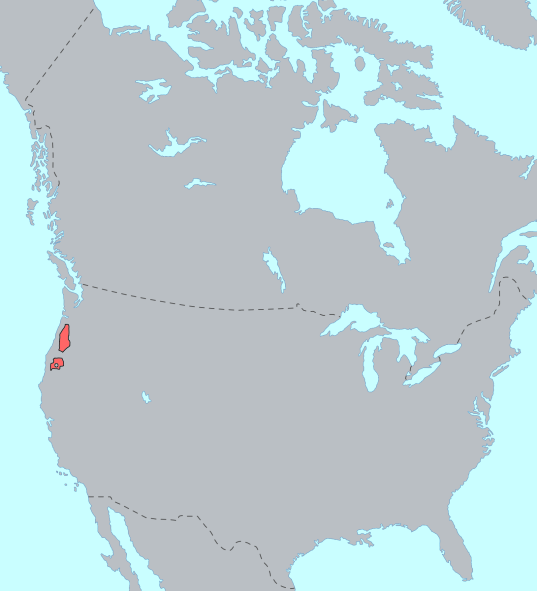
- Takelma (south), with the Kalapuyan languages to the north

Takelma /təˈkɛlmə/ is the language that was spoken by the Latgawa and Takelma peoples and the Cow Creek band of Upper Umpqua, in Oregon, United States. The language was extensively described by the German-American linguist Edward Sapir in his graduate thesis, The Takelma Language of Southwestern Oregon (1912). Sapir's grammar together with his Takelma Texts (1909) are the main sources of information on the language. Both are based on work carried out in 1906 with language consultant Frances Johnson (Takelma name Kʷìskʷasá:n), who lived on to become the last surviving fluent speaker. In 1934, with her death at the age of 99, the language became extinct. An English-Takelma dictionary is currently being created on the basis of printed sources with the aim of reviving the language.

== Name ==
The commonly used English name of the language is derived from Ta:-kɛlm-àʔn, the self-name of the Takelma people, which means "those dwelling along the Rogue River (Ta:-kɛlám)". (Note: Sapir (1912, p. 7) Dāᵃ-gelmaˊᵋn, 223 Dāᵃ-gela`m /Ta:-kɛlám/ "Rogue River", 222 suffix -aˊᵋ(n) /-àʔ(n)/ "person(s) coming from".)

== Dialects ==
There were at least four Takelma dialects:

- Lower Takelma, Sapir's Takelma proper, spoken in the Rogue Valley in southwestern Oregon
- Upper Takelma or Latgawa, spoken along the upper Rogue River in southwestern Oregon
- Takelma B, known from a vocabulary recorded by W.H. Barnhardt in 1859
- Takelma H, known from a vocabulary recorded by W.B. Hazen in 1857

A few nouns are attested for all four dialects:

	Lower	Upper	B	H
"dog"	ts’ìxi	ts’isi	tši:ki:	tši:hwi:
"wolf"	pá:xtis	maym	pa:xtiš	poktiš
"water"	xí	si	txi:	hwi:
"nose"	sini:x-	tsin-	šinik-	šiniš
"beaver"	spí:n	tspink	špin	spin
"(grizzly) bear"	mèna	menák	mena	mena

== Classification ==
Takelma is accepted as one of the many language isolates of North America. Writing in 1909, Sapir stated that "the Takelma language represents one of the distinct linguistic stocks of North America". He later revised his opinion, and assigned Takelma to the hypothetical Penutian language family, (Note: Sapir's full 1929 classification scheme including the Penutian proposal can be seen here: Classification of indigenous languages of the Americas#Sapir (1929): Encyclopædia Britannica.) a grouping that at present is not generally considered established. Over the years, several linguists have presented evidence which, in their view, linked Takelma to the other "Penutian" languages, in particular the Kalapuyan languages. A reexamination of the evidence by Tarpent and Kendall (1998, unpublished) however showed that purported lexical and grammatical similarities between Takelma and other languages were erroneous, and they concluded that Takelma is indeed an isolate.

== Phonology ==
=== Consonants ===
Takelma has 22 phonemic consonants which occur in normal speech. In addition, there are two consonants of restricted use: (Note: Sapir (1912, p. 31) lists (ɬ) in his table of consonants, but in Sapir (1912, p. 8) note 2 he points out the existence of both (ɬ) and similarly used (ɕ), which is added to the table here.)

		Labial	Alveolar		Palatal	Velar		Glottal
		Labial	plain	sibilant	Palatal	plain	labial	Glottal
Nasal		m	n					
Plosive/ Affricate	tenuis	p	t			k	kʷ	ʔ
Plosive/ Affricate	aspirated	pʰ	tʰ			kʰ	kʷʰ	
Plosive/ Affricate	ejective	pʼ	tʼ	tsʼ		kʼ	kʷʼ	
Fricative			(ɬ)	s	(ɕ)	x		h
Approximant			l		j		w	

Two consonants do not occur in normal everyday speech: in the narration of myths, /ɬ/ is the "grizzly-bear prefix" which can be prefixed to any word in the reported speech of the grizzly bear, symbolizing the animal's coarseness; and /ɕ/ is the "coyote prefix", prefixed to words in the reported speech of the coyote; thus /kʷìti/ 'where?' (normal speech), /ɬkʷìti/ (grizzly bear speaking), /ɕkʷìti/ (coyote speaking).

- /ts’, s/ have optional alveolo-palatal allophones [tɕ’, ɕ], which occur mainly word-initially before a vowel, and intervocalically.
- /w, j/ are vocalized in syllable-final position:
  - /piliw-átʰ/ [piliwátʰ] 'you jump' vs /piliw-tʰɛʔ/ [piliutʰɛʔ] 'I jump'
  - /kaːj-àʔtʰ/ [kaːjàʔtʰ] 'he will grow' vs /kaːj-kʰ/ [kaːikʰ] 'he grew'

=== Vowels ===
Takelma has six vowel qualities, with contrastive length:

	Front		Central		Back	
	short	long	short	long	short	long
Close	i	iː	ʉ	ʉː	u	uː
Mid	ɛ	ɛː			o	oː
Open			a	aː		

- /ɛ/ is open-mid while /o/ is close-mid.
- Sapir also notes the existence of close-mid [eː], as in [laːleːtʰam] 'you became', [kaneːhiʔ] 'and then', which he considers to be an (apparently unconditioned) allophone of /i:/.

=== Pitch-accent ===
Stressed syllable are pronounced with a pitch-accent, as described by Sapir:

1. a simple pitch distinctly higher than the normal pitch of unstressed speech;
2. a rising inflection that starts at, or a trifle above, the normal pitch, and gradually slides up to the same higher pitch referred to above;
3. a falling inflection that starts at, or generally somewhat higher than, the raised pitch of (1) and (2), and gradually slides down to fall either in the same or immediately following syllable, to pitch somewhat lower than the normal [high pitch].

The rising pitch (2) is clearly a conditioned realization of the high pitch (1) that occurs with syllables containing a long vowel, or syllables which end in a resonant /m n l w y/. High pitch can thus be said to be phonetically realized on the latter part of a long vowel, or on a syllable-final resonant: (Note: Sapir (1912) marks the "delayed" high pitch with a tilde: 216 gwãn, mẽx, bĩk‛ʷ, nõx, hũlk‛, 47 külü̃m, 17 dasmayam̃, nañk‛, gwal̃t‛, 35 gayaũ, gāĩ.)

/kʷá:n/	[kʷaán]	"trail"
/mɛ́:x /	[mɛɛ́x]	"crane"
/pí:kʰʷ/	[piíkʰʷ]	"skunk"
/nó:x/	[noóx]	"rain"
/hú:lkʰ/	[huúlkʰ]	"panther"
/kʰʉlʉ́:m/	[kʰʉlʉʉ́m]	"fish (sp.)"
/tasmayám/	[tasmayaḿ]	"he smiled"
/nánk/	[nańk]	"he will say"
/kʷáltʰ/	[kʷaĺtʰ]	"wind"
/kayáw/	[kayaú]	"he ate it"
/ká:y/	[ka:í]	"grow!"

There is no pitch in words that are pronounced without stress. As Sapir comments, "it not infrequently happens that the major part of a clause will thus be strung along with-out decided stress-accent until some emphatic noun or verb-form is reached", as in the sentence:

kane:hiʔ tɛwɛnxa la:le: honoʔ pʰɛlɛ̀xaʔ
{and then} tomorrow {it became} again {they went out to war}
"and then, the next day, they went out to war again"

"All that precedes the main verb form /pʰɛlɛ̀xaʔ/ 'they went out to war' is relatively un-important, and hence is hurried over without anywhere receiving marked stress [or pitch]".

=== Sapir's transcription ===
The transcription system used by Sapir (1909, 1912) is the then current version of the Americanist phonetic notation, which has long since been superseded. Its use in the publications of Sapir and other linguists working in the late 19th and early 20th centuries now impedes accessibility to the modern linguist. Below is a table pairing Sapir's notations with the International Phonetic Alphabet (IPA). Note especially Sapir's idiosyncratic way of marking pitch.

Sapir	IPA	Sapir	IPA	Sapir	IPA
m	/m/	a	/a/	o	/o/
n	/n/	a`	/á/	o`	/ó/
b, p	/p/	a´, á	/à/	o´, ó	/ò/
d	/t/	ā, āᵃ	/a:/	ō, ōᵘ	/o:/
g	/k/	ã	/á:/	õ	/ó:/
gw	/kʷ/	ā´ᵃ	/à:/	ō´ᵘ	/ò:/
p‛	/pʰ/				
t‛	/tʰ/	e	/ɛ/	u	/u/
k‛	/kʰ/	e`	/ɛ́/	u`	/ú/
k‛w, k‛ʷ	/kʰʷ/	e´, é	/ɛ̀/	u´, ú	/ù/
p!	/p’/	eᵉ, è	/ɛ:/	ū, ūᵘ	/u:/
t!	/t’/	ẽ	/ɛ́:/	ũ	/ú:/
k!	/k’/	e´ᵉ	/ɛ̀:/	ū´ᵘ	/ù:/
k!w	/k’ʷ/				
ᵋ	/ʔ/	i	/i/	ü	/ʉ/
s	/s/	i`	/í/	ü`	/ʉ́/
s·, c	[ɕ] for /s/, /ɕ/*	i´, í	/ì/	ü´	/ʉ̀/
x	/x/	ī, īⁱ	/i:/	üᵘ, ǖ	/ʉ:/
h	/h/	ĩ	/í:/	ü̃	/ʉ́:/
ts!	/ts’/	ī´ⁱ	/ì:/	ü´ᵘ	/ʉ̀:/
ts·!, tc!	[cɕ’] for /ts’/				
ł, ʟ	/ɬ/*	Vũ	[Vú] for /V́u/	ä	[æ]*
l	/l/	Vĩ	[Ví] for /V́i/	â	[ɔ:] for /a:/
w	/w/	Vl̃	[Vĺ] for /V́l/	ô	[ɔ] for /a/
y	/j/	Vm̃	[Vḿ] for /V́m/	û, ᴀ	[ʌ] for /a/
dj	[dʒ]*	Vñ	[Vń] for /V́n/	ᴇ	[ə]*
		Vⁿ	[Ṽ] for /Vn/	ē	[e:] for /i:/ (?)

(Phones marked with * occur in interjections and in sound-symbolic forms, but not in normal speech; [ə] is also epenthetic.)

== Grammar ==
Takelma, like many Native American languages, is polysynthetic meaning that one can link together many different morphemes to form a word. Therefore, one single word can often contain a lot of information that in English would be portrayed in a full sentence. This is mainly done by adding affixes to verbs.

=== Tense ===
Takelma has 6 different "tenses" listed below with the first (aorist) being the basic tense which is equivalent to the immediate future, present, and past.

1. Aorist
2. Potential
3. Future
4. Inferential
5. Present Imperative
6. Future Imperative

=== Person and possession ===
In Takelma, possession is marked by a set of affixes. Most of them are suffixes but there is one prefix. Below is a table of the four declensional sets.

		I	II	III	IV
1st person	singular	wi-	-t/tʰekʰ	´-tʰkʰ	-té:
1st person	plural	-tam	-tam	-tam	-tam
2nd person	singular	`-ʔtʰ	-t/tʰeʔ	`-ʔtʰ	-taʔ
2nd person	plural	-ʔtʰpan	-t/tʰapaʔn	`-ʔtʰpan	tapaʔn or `-ʔtʰpan
3rd person	singular/plural	-(x)	-t/tʰ	`-(tʰ)	`-ta
3rd person	singular reflexive	-(x)akʷa	-t/tʰakʷa	`-tʰkʷa	`-tʰkʷa or `-takʷa
3rd person	plural	-(x)akʷan	-t/tʰakʷan	`-tʰkʷan	`-takʷan or `-tʰkʷan

Set I is only ever used with terms of kinship. For example:

wi-wá: ‘my younger brother’	wà:-ʔtʰ ‘your younger brother’	wi:-xa ‘his younger brother’

Set II is used with bare stems or stems having the formant. For example:

-x:hè:l ‘song’	hè:l-tʰekʰ ‘my song’	hè:l-tʰa ‘his song’

tàkax-tekʰ ‘my head’	tàkax-ta ‘his head’

Alternations between –t and –tʰ in set II and set IV is regular and predictable.

Set III is used with stems having other formants. For example:

xá:n ‘urine’	xa:lám-tʰkʰ ‘my urine’	xa:lám ‘his urine’

tán ‘rock’	taná-tʰkʰ ‘my rock’	taná ‘his rock’

p’á:-n ‘liver’	p’á:n-tʰkʰ ‘my liver’	p’á:n-tʰ ‘his liver’

Set IV is used in locative constructions. For example:

ha-wili-té ‘in my house’	versus	wili-tʰkʰ ‘my house’

xa:-kʷel-té ‘between my legs’	versus	kʷé:lx-tekʰ ‘my legs’

wa-té
‘to me’

=== Object markers ===
Takelma has a complex system of verbal pronominal suffixes and is also accompanied by the loss of case markers on nouns. This represents a complete shift to full head marking. In the 3rd person object marker in Takelma, the suffix –kʰwa which is realized on the verb. However the distribution of –kʰwa is very restricted.

full set of object markers
	Singular	Plural
1st	-xi	-am
2nd	-pi	-ampʰ
3rd	∅/ -kʰwa	∅/ -kʰwa

For the 1st and 2nd person objects overt marking is required with clear difference between singular and plural. For 3rd person there is no difference between singular and plural and there is also alternation between the suffix –kʰwa and zero suffix.

The zero variant occurs with animates as well as inanimate, covert pronouns, and overt nominals.

However –kʰwa occurs in three distinct environments. First, when the subject is also 3rd person. Second, it is always used when the object is higher in animacy than the subject. This means that the object refers to a human also a mythic animal that is thought of as a human being. The third situation is when the subject and object are of equal animacy but the object outranks the subject in topicality.

=== Numerals ===
These are listed by Sapir as follows:

1	mì:ʔskaʔ, mì(:)ʔs	"once"	mʉ:ʔxtán
2	kà:p’iní ~ kà:pʔiní, kà:ʔm	"twice"	kà:ʔman
3	xìpiní, xín	3 x	xíntʰ
4	kamkàm	4 x	kamkàman
5	tɛ́:hal	5 x	tɛ́:haltan
6	haʔi:mì:ʔs	6 x	haʔi:mìts’atán
7	haʔi:kà:ʔm	7 x	haʔi:kà:ʔmatán
8	haʔi:xín	8 x	haʔi:xíntán
9	haʔi:kó	9 x	haʔi:kó:katán
10	ìxtì:l	10 x	ìxti:ltán
11	ìxtì:l mì:ʔskaʔ katákʰ		
12	ìxtì:l kà:ʔm katákʰ		
20	jap’amìʔs	20 x	jap’amìts’atan
30	xìn ixti:l		
40	kamkàman ixtì:l		
50	tɛ́:haltan ixtì:l		
60	haʔi:mìts’atan ixtì:l		
70	haʔi:kà:ʔmatan ixtì:l		
80	haʔi:xìntan ixtì:l		
90	haʔi:ko:katàn ixtì:l		
100	t’ɛimìʔs		
200	kà:ʔman t’ɛimìʔs		
300	xín t’ɛimìʔs		
400	kamkàman t’ɛimìʔs		
1000	ìxti:ltan t’ɛimìʔs		
2000	jap’amìts’atan t’ɛimìʔs		
5000	tɛ́:haltan ìxti:ltán t’ɛimìʔs		

== Cited works and further reading ==
- Achen, Paris (Jan 11, 2008). "Pair breathe life into dead language". Mail Tribune. Archived from the original on July 31, 2013.
- Aissen, Judith (2003). "Differential Coding, Partial Blocking, and Bidirectional OT". BLS 29: General Session and Parasession on Phonetic Sources of Phonological Patterns. 29: 1. doi:10.3765/bls.v29i1.981.
- Golla, Victor (2011). California Indian Languages. Berkeley: University of California Press.
- Kendall, D. (1982). "Some notes toward using Takelma data in historical and comparative work". Occasional Papers on Linguistics: Proceedings of the 1981 Hokan Languages Workshop and Penutian Languages Conference. 10: 78–81.
- Mithun, M. (1999). The Languages of Native North America. Cambridge University Press. ISBN 0-521-29875-X.
- Mithun, M. (2018). "Language Isolates". In L. Campbell (ed.). Language isolates of North America. London and New York: Routledge. ISBN 978-1-138-82105-7.
- Sapir, Edward (1907). "Notes on the Takelma Indians of Southwestern Oregon". American Anthropologist. 9 (2): 251–275. doi:10.1525/aa.1907.9.2.02a00010. JSTOR 659586.
- Sapir, Edward (1909). Takelma Texts. Anthropological Publications of the University Museum. Vol. 2. Philadelphia: University of Pennsylvania.
- Sapir, Edward (1912). The Takelma Language of Southwestern Oregon. Washington, D.C.: Government Printing Office.
- Sapir, Edward (1990). Golla, Victor (ed.). Takelma Texts and Grammar. Berlin: Mouton De Gruyter. doi:10.1515/9783110846324. ISBN 978-3-11-012329-6.
- Comparative vocabulary of the languages spoken by the 'Umpqua,' 'Lower Rogue River' [Takelma] and 'Calapooia' tribes of Indians" (35 pp., original dated May 1859), California Language Archive
