= Fort Hay (Oregon) =

Coordinates: 42.3113°N 123.6077°W

Fort Hay, also known as the Anderson (Stagecoach) Station, is an American fortification built in the Illinois Valley, near Selma, Oregon, USA. The fort was built on a donation land grant filed by William B. Hay in 1854.

== Rogue River Indian Wars ==
On Sunday, March 23, 1856, Fort Hay was attacked by 200 warriors of the Takelma tribe. A nearby group of 50 soldiers under Lt. Armstrong began to march towards Fort Hay, and stopped 300 yards from the fort. Orders were immediately sent out to quickly occupy the fort. Upon entering they found the Hay family safe inside the house and found soldiers John Davis and Alexander Caldwell dead and one mule handler severely wounded. Showing exemplary courage, 6 men carried off the dead men under heavy fire from the Indians. Reportedly, the Indians shooting was very inaccurate, and the rest of the day the fighting was limited to sniping. That night, the Indians made many fires on the heights overlooking the fort to the East, presumably burning their 5 dead. As soon as darkness fell, a rider was sent to Fort Vannoy, the site of the Oregon Volunteer Militia headquarters for Southern Oregon, asking for reinforcements. Another rider was also sent to warn Fort Briggs and the inhabitants of the Illinois Valley as to the threat of Indians. Sometime during the night, the Indians retreated towards 8 Dollar Mountain, and later that day volunteers arrived from Fort Vannoy under Major Bruce. On March 25, Volunteers under Major Bruce clashed with the Takelma near 8 Dollar Mountain a few miles to the south-west. The rest of the war, the fort was home to 6 Volunteer companies.

== Post-War ==
After the war, a post office was established here in 1889, and was moved to nearby Selma in 1897. The fort burned down on Jan. 19, 1951. Only a marker located across State Highway 199, on the former Egan Ranch (2017-2026), pays tribute to the fort.
