= Fort Briggs =

American fortification in Oregon

Coordinates: 42°7′58″N 123°36′40″W

Fort Briggs is an American fortification located in the Illinois Valley, near Cave Junction, Oregon, USA. Originally the fort started out as a stockade for mule trains operated by George E. Briggs. Mr. Briggs was a state legislator that created Josephine County out of nearby Jackson County. Briggs got a land grant in Feb. 1854 and set out building a cabin of squared logs in the stockade.

== Rogue River Indian Wars ==
When war broke out in 1855, the stockade was converted into a fort. Fort Briggs had the job of protecting settlers from Sucker Creek and the lower Illinois Valley. On March 23, 1856, a rider from Fort Hay, located in the upper Illinois Valley, came bearing news of Takelma warriors attacking Fort Hay and to be vigilant. Throughout the war, Briggs provided shelter for about 80 settlers.

== Post-war ==
The fort was abandoned at the end of the war because it was no longer needed. In 1908, the original fort burned to the ground. Today, the site is only commemorated by a historical marker nearby.
