= Superintendent of Indian Affairs =

Superintendent of Indian Affairs may refer to:

- Superintendent in the Indian Department of British North America
- Superintendent of Indian Affairs at the Bureau of Indian Affairs in the U.S.
- Minister of Crown–Indigenous Relations in Canada
- Oregon Superintendent of Indian Affairs
