= Fort Vannoy =

American fortification near Grants Pass, Oregon

Coordinates: 42.4372°N 123.4198°W

Fort Vannoy is an American fortification located 4mi west of Grants Pass, Oregon, USA. Vannoy guarded a ford on the Rogue River which had been used by the Hudson's Bay Company since 1827, the Wilkes expedition in 1841, and settlers on the Applegate Trail. A man named Mr. Long constructed the first non-native structure on the Rogue River in 1850, and started a ferry service. In 1851, James Vannoy and James Tuffs bought the ferry and began operating it. The fort was established in 1855, at the outbreak of the Rogue River Wars. During the war, the fort was the site of the headquarters for the Southern Oregon Volunteer Battalion. The fort was most likely named after the man who donated it, James Vannoy.

== Rogue River Indian Wars ==
During the Rogue River Indian Wars, Fort Vannoy was chosen as the site of the HQ of the Southern Oregon Volunteer Battalion in Oct-Nov. of 1855. The fort was merely a stockade and minor earthworks with thicker walls guarding a ford on the Rogue River. Both Fort and Camp Vannoy are mentioned, with the camp presumably being the one that surrounded the fort during the war. On March 23, 1856, Major Bruce led a company of volunteers to relieve the besieged Fort Hay, 18mi SW of modern Grants Pass. Major Bruce and his men later went on to defeat the Takelma warriors in the Illinois Valley at the Battle of 8 Dollar Mountain on March 25.

== Post-war ==
After the war, the fort was abandoned as a military post. While the exact location of the fort is unknown, since the fort was ¼ of a mile from the ford on the river, it gives us a more narrowed search area. Today, a farm called Fort Vannoy Farms is located in the approximate area of the fort.
