= Confederated Tribes of the Grand Ronde Community of Oregon =

Federally recognized Indian tribe in Oregon, United States

Confederated Tribes of the Grand Ronde Community
- Tribal flag

Total population
- Enrolled citizens: 5,200

Regions with significant populations
- United States (Oregon)

Languages
- English, Chinook Jargon

The Confederated Tribes of the Grand Ronde Community of Oregon (CTGR) is a federally recognized tribe of Indigenous peoples of the Northwest Plateau. They consist of at least 27 Native American tribes with long historical ties to present-day western Oregon between the western boundary of the Oregon Coast and the eastern boundary of the Cascade Range, and the northern boundary of southwestern Washington and the southern boundary of northern California.

The community has an 11,288-acre (45.7 km^{2}) Indian reservation, the Grand Ronde Indian Reservation. Established in 1856, the reservation occupies parts of Yamhill and Polk counties.

Because the tribes had lived near each other, and often spoke more than one language for use in trading, after they were grouped in the 19th century on the reservation, they refined a creole language that became known as Chinook Wawa. Although long forced to speak English, the people are working to conserve this Native language. They have taught Native speakers through immersion programs for young children.

== Member bands of the confederation ==
The tribes who were removed to the Grand Ronde reservation are:

- Chasta (or Shasta; from present-day Oregon and California bands of the Shasta Nations)
- Chasta Costa (Southern Oregon Athapaskan speakers)
- Kalapuya (Yamel (Yamhill), Winefelly, (Mohawk), Atfalati (Tualatin), Yoncalla (Kommema), Ahantchuyuk (Pudding River), Santiam), Chelamela, Chemapho, Champinefu, Luckiamute, Chafan
- Molalla (Santiam Forks Band, Northern Molala, Mountain Band, Crooked Finger Band)
- Rogue River (Historically an erroneous name conglomerating Takelma, Upper Umpqua, Northern Shasta, and Rogue River Athapaskan tribes)
- Klickitat
- Klamath
- Chinook (Ne-pe-chuck (Multnomah), Thomas Band Chinook, Williams Band Chinook, Wal-la-lah band of Tumwaters (Cascades), Johns Band Chinook (Clowewalla- Oregon City), Clackamas Chinook)
- Tillamook (Salmon River, Tillamook, Nechesne (Salmon River), Nehalem, Nestucka)

=== United States ratified treaties establishing the CTGR ===
- Treaty with the Cow Creek Band of Umpqua, 1853 (Land sale, established a temporary reservation)
- Treaty with the Rogue River, 1853 (Land sale, established the Table Rock Reservation)
- Treaty with the Chasta, etc., 1854 (Land sale, moved them to Table Rock Reservation)
- Treaty with the Rogue River, 1854 (agreement to allow Chasta Costa on Table Rock Reservation and confederate the tribes.)
- Treaty with the Umpqua and Kalapuya, 1854 (Land Sale, created the Umpqua Reservation (Coles Valley)); secondary agreement signed by the chiefs allowed for the Molele on the reservation.
- Treaty with the Kalapuya, etc. (Willamette Valley Treaty), 1855 (Land Sale, tribes removed to temporary reserves in the valley and on the Columbia)
- Treaty with the Molalla, 1855 (Land Sale, moved to Umpqua Reservation, first treaty to mention the Yamhill River Reserve (Grand Ronde Indian Reservation)

=== United States unratified treaties related to CTGR ===
- Treaty with the Santiam, 1851
- Treaty with the Tualatin, 1851
- Treaty with the Yamhill, 1851
- Treaty with the Luckiamute, 1851
- Treaty with the Clackamas, 1851
- Treaty with the Klatskania, 1851
- Treaty with the Principal band of Molala, 1851
- Treaty with the Santiam Band of Molalla, 1851
- Treaty with the Clatsop, 1851
- Treaty with the Naalem, 1851
- Treaty with the Tillamook, 1851
- Treaty with the Waukikum, 1851
- Treaty with the Kathlamet, 1851
- Treaty with the Tualatin, 1854.
- Treaty with the Coastal tribes, 1855. (Many of these people ended up at CTGR and our histories align for several tribes.)
- all treaties

=== United States peace treaties related to Grand Ronde ===
- Treaty of Peace with the Rogue River Tribes, 1850, Negotiated by General Joseph Lane.
- Treaty of Peace with the Rogue River Tribes, 1853. Negotiated by General Joseph Lane and Joel Palmer.

== History ==
=== 19th century ===
From 1854 to 1856, the U.S. Army resettled Native people from western Oregon, the Oregon coast, and along the Columbia River to territory along the South Yamhill River. It was here that the Grand Ronde Reservation was established in 1857. In 1887, with the passage of the Dawes Act, the Grand Ronde Reservation was reduced through the privatization of property. Land that was not allotted to Natives through the process of privatization was made available to non-Native ownership.

=== 20th century ===
In 1936, Grand Ronde voted to confederate, accept an Indian Reorganization Act (IRA) government, and adopted a constitution and by-laws modeled after the U.S. government. In 1954, US Congress "terminated" the tribe. The land of terminated tribes was no longer tax-exempt. Faced with the increased cost of land ownership, many lost their property. In addition, people from terminated tribes could no longer attend Chemawa School and had to pay for medical services. In 1956 the reservation was closed and the tribal council disbanded. In 1975, the tribal council was reconstituted. In 1983, House Resolution 3885 restored federal recognition status to the Confederated Tribes of Grand Ronde. Five years after this resolution, a small portion of the original reservation was returned to Grand Ronde which is used today for timber, recreation, and traditional harvesting practices.

The tribes began publishing Smoke Signals, then a monthly newsletter, in 1978; it has since shifted to a semi-monthly publication schedule, and a tabloid newspaper format.

== Cultures ==
The Confederated Tribes of Grand Ronde has a curriculum specialist who created tribal history lessons funded in part by Oregon Senate Bill 13, which supplies funds for each of the nine federally recognized tribes in Oregon to create curriculum about Native Americans' contributions to Oregon history.

A Chinuk Wawa immersion program is available for kindergarteners and first graders. The tribe published Chinuk Wawa: As our elders teach us to Speak It, a Chinuk Wawa dictionary, in 2012.

In 2010, the tribe built a plank house on the reservation. In 2011, Grand Ronde Canoe Journey, an exhibit about the tribe's canoe traditions, was installed at the Willamette Heritage Center.

Every year the reservation hosts powwows and a Round Dance.

== Reservation and land management ==
The community has an 11,288-acre (46 km^{2}) Indian reservation, the Grand Ronde Indian Reservation, located in Yamhill and Polk counties of Oregon. In the 2000s, the tribe's population was more than 5,500 members.

The tribe partners with Oregon Metro to manage land according to traditional use, such as for quamash harvest at Quamash Prairie.

Map of the Grand Ronde Community with neighbouring reservations (In blue)

== Economy ==
The Tribes employ around 1,600 people.

Since 1996, the tribes have generated most of their income by operating the Spirit Mountain Casino in Grand Ronde, between Lincoln City and Salem. The most successful casino in Oregon, it attracts considerable tourist traffic from the coastal beaches and resorts. Six percent of the casino's profits goes to the Tribes' Spirit Mountain Community Fund, which supports and funds various organizations in the following 11 western Oregon area counties: Benton, Clackamas, Lane, Lincoln, Linn, Marion, Multnomah, Polk, Tillamook, Washington, and Yamhill. By 2017, the Spirit Mountain Community Fund had given more than $75 million to non-profit organizations, making it Oregon's eighth largest charitable foundation.

They also earn revenue from the management of their timber resources. They have developed "other tribal enterprises in construction and environmental management, real estate investment and inventory logistics services."

In the 21st century, the Grand Ronde tribes have opposed the Confederated Tribes of Warm Springs' plans to build an off-reservation casino in Cascade Locks, Oregon. They spent more than $800,000 trying to influence decisions on the issue by supporting certain candidates in the 2006 primary races for Governor of Oregon.

== Tribal languages ==
Historically the tribe had people speaking 27 distinct languages. Numerous members of these tribes could speak more than one language due to their proximity and trading relationships. The Oregon Territory was one of the most linguistically diverse regions in the world. On the reservation, most Native Americans began communicating using Chinook Jargon, the trade language that had developed earlier. The Chinook Jargon was widely spoken throughout the Northwest between tribes and newcomers to the region.

At Grand Ronde reservation, Chinook Jargon developed as a creole language, and was the first language in most native homes. Tribal members continued to use this language, even as their children were educated in English and through the termination era (1954–1983). During this period, children were being sent to Indian boarding schools and forced to learn English; all individual tribal languages at Grand Ronde became extinct as their last native speakers died.

In the 1970s, Grand Ronde elders began teaching Chinook Jargon language classes in the community. In 1983, the Confederated tribes of Grand Ronde regained federal recognition as a sovereign tribe. As part of restoration, they established a formal language program for children, which they could support through revenues generated from gaming. They renamed Chinook Jargon as Chinuk Wawa (Talking Chinuk). The Grand Ronde tribe's immersion language program has produced native speakers, joining another half-dozen Native language immersion programs in such success. This program begins in preschool classes (Lilu) and continues into Kindergarten. The language program officials plan to expand the immersion program to a pre-8 grade program, and offer classes for adults. This will create speakers of the language to help the language survive in perpetuity.

== Enrollment ==
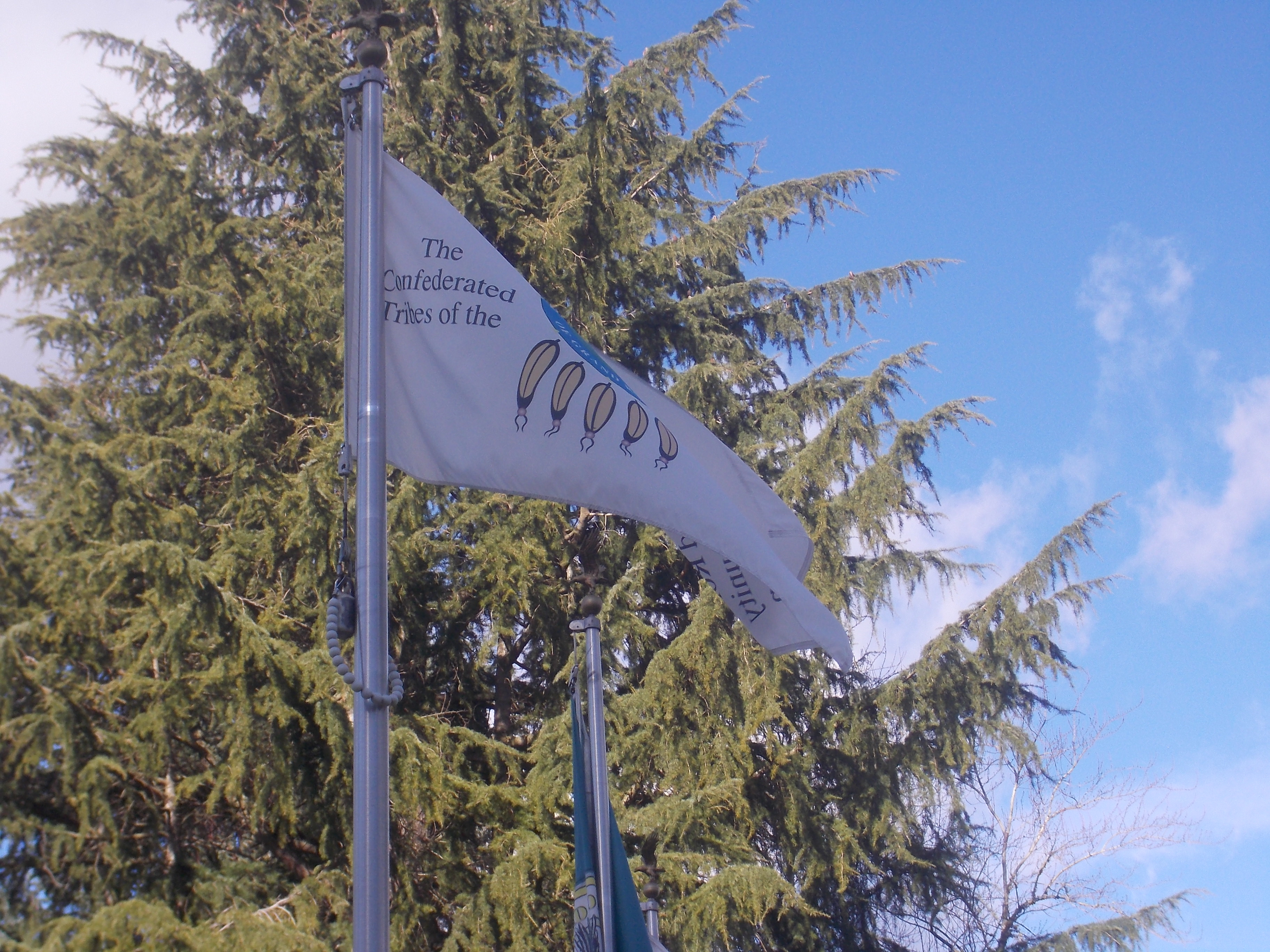
Tribal flag flying at the Walk of Flags at the State Capitol

The elected tribal council sets the rules for membership. Generally, membership requires direct descent from a person listed on the rolls at particular times and a percentage of Native American ancestry from among the tribes in the Confederation. Being a member of the tribe has an estimated financial benefit of between $5500 and $7000 per year when such things as housing benefits, student scholarships and per capita payouts from casino revenue are added up; however, that does not include health care or elder pension.

Created by the Tribal Constitution, the Grand Ronde Tribal Council was set up to be the tribe's primary governing and legislative body. The council is made up of nine standing members. Each member is meant to serve a three-year term with three council seats up for re-election every year and no restrictions for how many terms a council member can serve. To qualify for a position as a council member, a person simply needs to be 18 years or older and be an enrolled member of the Tribe according to the Tribal Constitution. To vote for council members, confirmed tribal members mail in ballots with verified signatures on file with the Tribal Election Board, and the forty-five days preceding the September General Council meeting is when the elections are officially held.

=== Disenrollment of descendants of Tumulth ===
As a result of political conflict, in 2014 the tribal council voted to disenroll en masse 66 living descendants and six deceased descendants of the 19th-century Chief Tumulth. Chief Tumulth of the Cascade Band of Chinuk had signed the 1855 treaty with the United States that ceded tribal land and agreed to relocation to the Grand Ronde reservation, established by this treaty.

"The Chief Tumulth descendants were classified as "provisionally dis-enrolled" Grand Ronde members in July 2014, which stripped them of almost all their tribal rights, including voting rights in the Grand Ronde elections. A three-judge Tribal Court of Appeals panel restored the 66 descendants as full tribal members." But, based on tribal law, the court could not restore membership to six members, who were posthumously dis-enrolled in 2014. The law prohibits heirs and descendants from challenging such action.

Attorney Gabriel Galanda defended the Tumulth descendants and has strongly opposed such "politically motivated" dis-enrollment. Russell Wilkinson, a spokesperson for the descendants, said that such dis-enrollment was a self-destructive practice of tribes. Tribal council elections were scheduled for September 10, 2016.

In August 2016 the tribal Court of Appeals (en banc) overturned the tribe's mass dis-enrollment in 2014 of 66 living descendants of Chief Tumulth of the watlala Band of Chinuk, who had signed the 1855 treaty with the United States by which his tribe ceded communal land and agreed to the Grand Ronde reservation. This was the first such action by a tribal court overturning dis-enrollment of members by a tribe.

== Tomanowos, or Willamette Meteorite ==
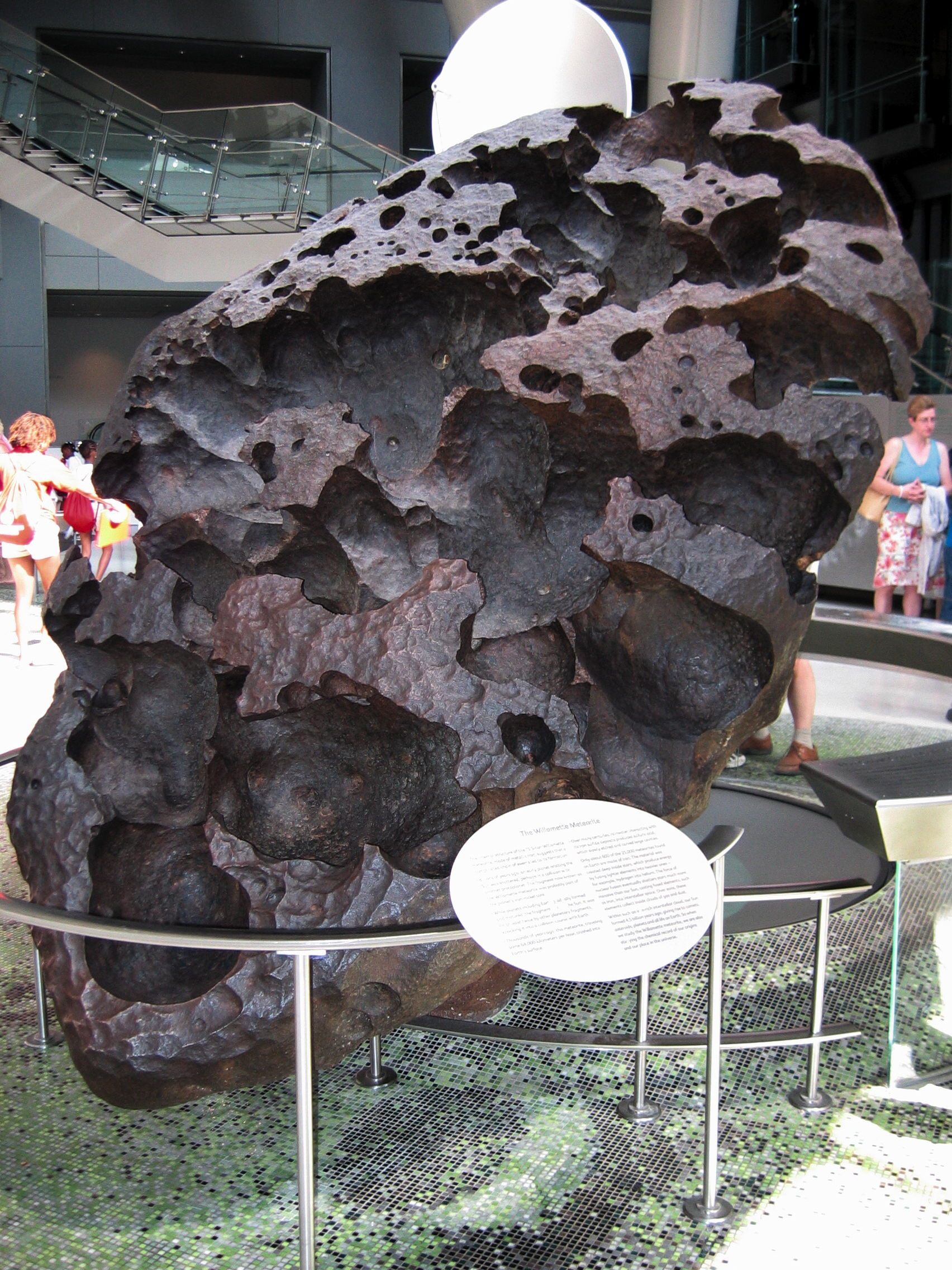
The Willamette Meteorite on display at the American Museum of Natural History in New York City.

Since 2000, members of the tribe travel to New York City annually in July to see Tomanowos, also known as the Willamette Meteorite. This meteorite was taken from Oregon years ago and has been displayed at American Museum of Natural History as a natural curiosity.

The Clackamas people, one of the Grand Ronde tribes, perceive this 15-ton meteorite as a sacred Sky Person who fell to earth thousands of years ago and helped create their people and their world. Efforts since the late 20th century to repatriate the meteorite to Oregon were not successful, but the CTGR (successor to the Clackamas, one of the confederation) reached a historic agreement in June 2000 with the American Museum of Natural History. The tribe can have periodic access to Tomanowos for religious and cultural purposes. They perform rites and ceremonies related to their belief in the Tomanowos' role in their sacred history.

The American Museum of Natural History of New York City bought the meteorite in 1906 from the Oregon Iron and Steel Company, which at the time owned the land on which it was found. This land was historically occupied by the Clackamas prior to European-American immigration. The museum has displayed the meteorite since then, known as the largest found in North America. Since 1999, it has been featured at the new addition known as the Rose Center for Earth and Space.

In the late 20th century, the tribe attempted to repatriate Tomanowos under NAGPRA, the Native American Graves Protection and Repatriation Act of 1990. The museum argued in federal district court in 2000 that the law applied to ceremonial objects made by the tribes, not to objects such as the meteorite, which occurred naturally and may be revered by peoples. It sued to be named as official owner of the meteorite.

The museum and CTGR tribe reached an agreement in June 2000 to share custody of the meteorite to preserve it for both religious and scientific purposes.

The American Museum of Natural History and the Confederated Tribes of the Grand Ronde Community of Oregon today signed a historic agreement that ensures access to the Willamette Meteorite, a world famous scientific specimen at the Museum, by the Grand Ronde for religious, historical, and cultural purposes while maintaining its continued presence at the Museum for scientific and educational purposes. The agreement recognizes the Museum's tradition of displaying and studying the Meteorite for almost a century, while also enabling the Grand Ronde to re-establish its relationship with the Meteorite with an annual ceremonial visit to the Meteorite.

In addition, the museum committed to establishing internships for Native Americans, to create new connections between the communities and make opportunities for young students.

In February 2019, the Evergreen Aviation & Space Museum returned a 4.5 ounce piece of the meteorite to the CTGR. The museum purchased this slice at auction in 2006.

== See also ==
- Indian termination policy
- Blue Heron Paper Company
- Official website: https://www.grandronde.org/
