= Coast Indian Reservation =

Former Indian reservation in Oregon, U.S.

Coordinates: 44.7539°N 123.7668°W

The Coast Indian Reservation is a former Indian reservation in the U.S. state of Oregon, established in 1855. It was gradually reduced in size and in the 21st century is known as the present-day Siletz Reservation.

== History ==
The Coast Reservation was established on November 9, 1855, by executive order for the coastal Indian tribes of Oregon. It was intended for removal of tribes involved in the Rogue River Wars from southern Oregon, as well as for small struggling tribes whose land the federal government wanted to take over for European-American settlement.

== Original area ==
The original reservation's western boundary ran 105 miles along the Pacific Ocean from present-day Dunes City in the south to Cape Lookout in the north. The eastern boundary was roughly the summit of the Central Oregon Coast Range. The reservation comprised 1.1 million acres, or about one-third of the Oregon Coast. The area encompassed most of present-day Lincoln County, much of western Lane County, and parts of Douglas, Benton, Yamhill, and Tillamook counties.

== See also ==
- List of Indian reservations in Oregon
