= Grand Ronde Community =

Indian reservation in Oregon, US

- Indian Reservation
- Location of Grand Ronde Community within Oregon
- Coordinates: 45°08′50″N 123°38′44″W
- Tribe: Confederated Tribes of the Grand Ronde Community of Oregon
- Country: United States
- State: Oregon
- County: Yamhill County; Polk County

Area
  - Total: 49.72 km^{2} (19.197 sq mi)

Population (2024)
  - Total: 2,010

The Grand Ronde Community is an Indian reservation located on several non-contiguous sections of land in southwestern Yamhill County and northwestern Polk County, Oregon, United States, about 18 miles (29 km) east of Lincoln City, near the community of Grand Ronde. In the mid-19th century, the United States government forced various tribes and bands from all parts of Western Oregon to be removed from their homes and placed on this reservation. It is governed by the Confederated Tribes of the Grand Ronde Community of Oregon. The reservation has a land area of 19.197 square miles (49.72 km^{2}). The community had a population of 2,010 in the 2020 United States census. However, there are approximately 5,400 enrolled tribal members, most of whom live elsewhere.

Policing is handled by the Confederated Tribes of Grand Ronde Tribal Police.

== Geography ==
Grand Ronde Reservation is located near 45°08′50″N 123°38′44″W.

Map of the Grand Ronde Community with neighbouring reservations (In blue)

== Historical summary ==
- Since 6,000 BC or earlier, the Rogue River, Umpqua, Chasta, Kalapuya, Molalla, Salmon River, Tillamook, and Nestucca peoples lived in their traditional homelands
- 1854–1857: In the wake of the Rogue River Wars, the Grand Ronde reservation established by treaty arrangements in 1854 and 1855 and an Executive Order of June 30, 1857
- 1856: Fort Yamhill built next to reservation
- 1860s: Arrival of the Belgian Catholic missionary Father Adrien Croquet (renamed Crockett), uncle of the Cardinal Mercier, later followed by his nephew, Joseph Mercier. The non-ordained Joseph married into a local tribe, and many present-day tribespeople are among his descendants.
- 1901: U.S. Inspector James McLaughlin declared a 25,791-acre (104.37 km^{2}) tract of the reservation "surplus" and the U.S. sold it for $1.16 per acre ($287/km^{2}).
- 1936: Indian Reorganization Act enables the Tribe to re-purchase some land for homes
- 1954: Under the Termination Act, the tribe's federal status was ended.
- 1983: Grand Ronde Restoration Act: On November 22, 1983, President Ronald Reagan signed the Grand Ronde Restoration Act, restoring federal recognition to the people as a tribe.
- 1988: Tribe regains 9,811 acres (39.70 km^{2}). This is now about 10,052 acres (40.68 km^{2}).
