= Siletz Reservation =

Indian reservation in United States

- Indian reservation
- Location of the Siletz Reservation in Oregon
- Tribe: Confederated Tribes of Siletz Indians
- Country: United States
- State: Oregon
- County: Lincoln

Area
  - Total: 15.16 km^{2} (5.852 sq mi)
- Website: Confederated Tribes of Siletz Indians

The Siletz Reservation is a 5.852 sq mi (15.157 km^{2}) Indian reservation in Lincoln County, Oregon, United States, owned by the Confederated Tribes of Siletz. The reservation is made up of numerous non-contiguous parcels of land in east-central Lincoln County, mostly east of the city of Siletz, between it and the Polk County line.

Map of the Siletz Reservation with neighbouring reservations (In green)

== History ==
=== Establishment ===
In November 1855 President of the United States Franklin Pierce issued an executive order creating a reservation for the relocation of the indigenous peoples of the coastal region of the Oregon Territory. A 120-mile-long strip of land was designated for the Coast Indian Reservation. This reservation extended from Cape Lookout in Tillamook County on the north coast, extending to the Siltcoos River, near Florence in the South.

As Oregon's population grew, the federal government opened up some reservation lands for settlement by white newcomers, who displaced the indigenous peoples. The reservation area was reduced and fragmented by the executive order December 21, 1865 of President Andrew Johnson and by the Act of Congress March 3, 1875. The splitting of collective lands into individual parcels took place at the Siletz Reservation more than a decade before the Dawes Act of 1887 forced division of communal tribal lands into individual plots of 160 acres (65 ha) each to heads of households of tribal members, with any remaining acreage classified as "surplus" and sold to non-natives. This break-up of communal lands accelerated the process of atomization of the state's indigenous peoples.

Writing of his experiences in January 1879, a visitor described the houses of the Siletz reservation as "built of lumber, mostly about twenty feet square, with good floors, and roofed with shingles or good boards." The work on these was performed "almost entirely by the Indians themselves, under direction of the government carpenter," the visitor noted.

According to the testimony of John Boswell, resident physician of the U.S. Indian Agency at Siletz, by the summer of 1878 there were already more than 120 individual houses at the reservation, ranging in size from "twelve to fourteen feet square" up to one "eighteen by thirty-five, with kitchen running back with porch and woodshed." "They are constantly building as fast as the mill can supply lumber," Boswell advised.

Farms were surrounded by "as good rail and plank fences as can be found anywhere in the state" and the plow-work of farms showed evidence of "careful and honest labor," the 1879 visitor declared, adding that horses and livestock appeared to be in good condition.

Writing in a weekly newspaper, Boswell observed:

"Quite a number of them have good barns, with granaries to hold their crops. Some of them still make their beds on the floor, while perhaps one-half have bedsteads and tables, and perhaps one-third of them have their cooking stoves; and, indeed, some of their houses would lose nothing by comparison with many of the whites. As a general rule they go decently dressed, and many of them are extravagant in dress, wearing clothes that are more costly than their circumstances would justify; in this respect they are about like white people."

=== Cultural reprogramming ===
Boswell noted that the school in 1878 was in "prosperous condition for an Indian school" with an average daily attendance of over 50, including half a dozen children of white employees. Some children had to travel a significant distance to attend, so a noon meal was made available. Plans were in the offing to convert the school from a traditional educational facility to a "manual labor" boarding school in which "the girls will be educated in all the arts of housekeeping, while the boys will be required to work on the farm, or at trades, and all will be kept at the school and away from the influences of their former Indian habits."

This cultural assimilation was augmented by the introduction of a local unit of the Christian church, in the charge of the "efficient and zealous labors" of a professional minister, supplanting traditional belief systems. An 1879 visitor stated that the "intellectual and moral condition" of the Native American population was being transformed and ascribed considerable significance to the establishment of the church:

"Horse racing, foot racing, shooting, wrestling, fighting, gambling, and dancing were, in those [earlier] times, the regular and only occurrences which distinguished Sunday from other days.... But during the last few years they have had the full light of the civilizing and Christianizing influence of the peace policy, and it has worked a wonderful transformation in them. They now respect the Sabbath as a day of rest and worship. I never spent a quieter Sunday anywhere. The house was crowded with men, women, and children, who observed the utmost order and decorum during the services of worship and Sunday School. They were cleanly dressed and made a respectable appearance. At the conclusion of the services they immediately dispersed to their several homes."

Reservation land was divided into districts, with each district under the authority of a Native American policeman, all of whom reported to a professional Chief of Police, who was a white employee of the Indian Agency.

Tribal groups reestablished a presence in isolated portions of their traditional homelands.

=== White settlement ===
On May 16, 1895, President Grover Cleveland signed a proclamation declaring the so-called vacant lands of the 168,000 acre Yankton Indian Reservation of South Dakota and the roughly 250,000 acres of the Siletz Reservation open to settlement effective at noon, May 21. Land not already claimed by Native American families as individually-owned homesteads would at that time be available to non-Indian claimants.

Although a great percentage of the Siletz Reservation lands were mountainous and inarable, "a great many prospective settlers" were already on the ground ahead of the formal opening for claims, with lands around the mouth of the Siletz River in particularly high demand.

== Contemporary culture and lifestyle ==
=== Tribal housing ===
The confederated Siletz tribes have built several different areas for tribal members to live. The tribe has created a rent-to-buy style program so that tribal members are able to own their own houses. The tribe has also created elders housing units for the elderly tribal members, and they boast several different areas where members are able to rent tribal apartments, these apartments are spread all over the city on tribal properties.

=== Tribal events ===
The Siletz reservation is home to many tribal programs. The most prominent is the annual celebration held in Siletz on top of Government Hill, the Nesika Illahee Pow-wow. This event happens during the second weekend of August. The pow-wow opens up every year with a parade and leads into the celebration that lasts all weekend. Siletz is also home to many other cultural events such as a culture camp, youth activities, and activities for elders. The reservation also houses the Siletz dance house where solstice celebrations take place along with many other events like weddings and coming-of-age ceremonies.

=== Education ===
There is one K-12th grade school in Siletz, the Siletz Valley Charter School also known as the Siletz Valley Early College Academy. The school had been closed for many years but reopened in 2006 due to funding provided by Chinook Winds Casino. It is a public school within the Lincoln County School District.

=== Casino gambling ===
Since the late 20th century, the confederated Siletz tribes have established casino gambling on their land, generating income for the welfare of the tribal population, as well as contributing to county needs.

== See also ==
- Tolowa language
