= Aspen Butte =

Volcanic mountain peak in Oregon

- Location within Oregon

Highest point
- Elevation: 8,215 ft (2,504 m) NAVD 88
- Prominence: 3,088 ft (941 m)
- Coordinates: 42°18′56″N 122°05′15″W

Geography
- Location: Klamath County, Oregon, U.S.
- Parent range: Cascade Range
- Topo map: USGS Aspen Lake

Geology
- Rock age: 4.9–3.5 Ma
- Mountain type: Shield volcano
- Volcanic arc: Cascade Volcanic Arc
- Last eruption: Pleistocene

Climbing
- Easiest route: Trail

Aspen Butte is a steep-sided shield volcano in the Cascade Range of southern Oregon. It is located 15 miles (24 km) south of Pelican Butte and 15 miles (24 km) southeast of Mount McLoughlin. It rises over 4,000 feet (1,200 m) above the nearby shore of Upper Klamath Lake. Ice Age glaciers carved three large cirques into the north and northeast flanks of the mountain removing most of the original summit area including any evidence of a crater. The summit is now the high point along the curving ridge which bounds the southern edge of the cirques above steep cliffs.

Aspen Butte is the highest of four overlapping shield volcanoes within the Mountain Lakes Wilderness all of which have been carved to varying degrees by glaciers. The other volcanoes are 7,979-foot (2,432 m) Mount Harriman, 7,785-foot (2,373 m) Crater Mountain and 7,741-foot (2,359 m) Greylock Mountain. Another peak, 7,882-foot (2,402 m) Mount Carmine, which lies just over 1 mile (1.6 km) to the north of Aspen Butte, is actually not a separate volcano but the highest remnant of the north flank of the Aspen Butte volcano separated from it by two glacial cirques. Little Aspen Butte, a 7,235-foot (2,205 m) satellite cone, rises on the southern flanks of the main volcano separated from it by a 6,556-foot (1,998 m) pass.

== See also ==
- Mount McLoughlin
- Brown Mountain (Oregon)
- Pelican Butte
- Roxy Ann Peak
- Baldy (Jackson County, Oregon)
- Grizzly Peak (Oregon)
- Pilot Rock (Oregon)
- Mount Ashland
