= Upper and Lower Table Rock =

Two volcanic plateaus in Oregon, US

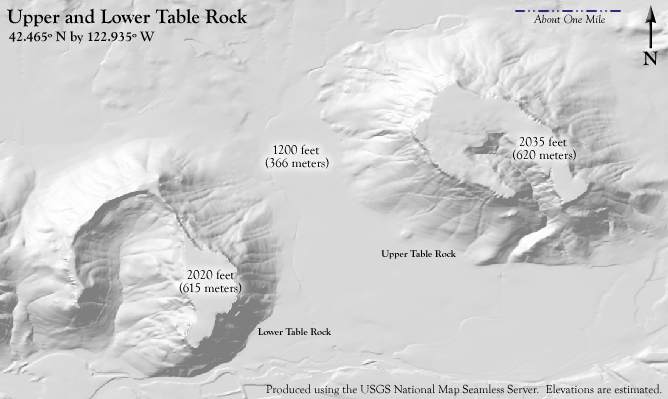
- Terrain of the Table Rocks. Upper Table Rock is on the right, Lower Table Rock is on the left.

Highest point
- Peak: Upper Table Rock
- Elevation: 2,091 ft (637 m)

Geography
- Location within Oregon
- Country: United States
- State: Oregon
- County: Jackson County
- Nearest city: White City, Oregon
- Range coordinates: 42°27′54″N 122°56′6″W
- Topo map: USGS Sams Valley

Geology
- Rock age: 7 million years
- Mountain type: Mesas

Upper Table Rock and Lower Table Rock are two prominent volcanic mesas located just north of the Rogue River in Jackson County, Oregon, U.S. Created by an andesitic lava flow approximately seven million years ago and shaped by erosion, they now stand about 800 feet (240 m) above the surrounding Rogue Valley. The Table Rocks are jointly owned; The Nature Conservancy is responsible for 3,591 acres (1,453 ha), while the Bureau of Land Management is responsible for 1,280 acres (520 ha).

Native Americans have inhabited the Table Rocks area for at least 15,000 years before European-American settlement. Starting in the mid-19th century during a gold rush, the settlers forced the Takelma tribe away from the Table Rocks and into reservations. The surrounding area was quickly developed. The Table Rock post office was established in 1872, an airstrip was built atop Lower Table Rock in 1948, and a very high frequency omni-directional range (VOR) aviation tower was constructed on Upper Table Rock in the 1960s. The Table Rocks were not protected until the 1970s.

The rocks are home to over 70 species of animals and 340 species of plants, which includes over 200 species of wildflowers. Vernal pools atop the mesas fill during the rainy season in winter and spring because the andesite is impermeable. The dwarf woolly meadowfoam, a species of wildflower, grows around these pools, and is endemic to the rocks. The pools are also one of only a few places where the federally threatened species of fairy shrimp, Branchinecta lynchi, can be found. To protect these and other threatened species, the Bureau of Land Management has listed the rocks as an Area of Critical Environmental Concern since 1984.

The Table Rocks are one of the most popular hiking locations in the Rogue Valley, with over 45,000 visitors annually. Two trails, Lower Table Rock Trail and Upper Table Rock Trail, were cut across the mesas' slopes in the early 1980s by the Youth Conservation Corps, Boy Scouts, and the Oregon Department of Forestry. This effort was coordinated by John Ifft, a forester for the Medford Office of the BLM.

The mesas are named for their relatively flat tops. Upper and Lower refer to their location along the Rogue River, not their height. Upper Table Rock, 2,091 feet (637 m) above sea level at its highest point, is located upstream, while Lower Table Rock is farther downstream, with an elevation of 2,049 feet (625 m).

== Geology and climate ==
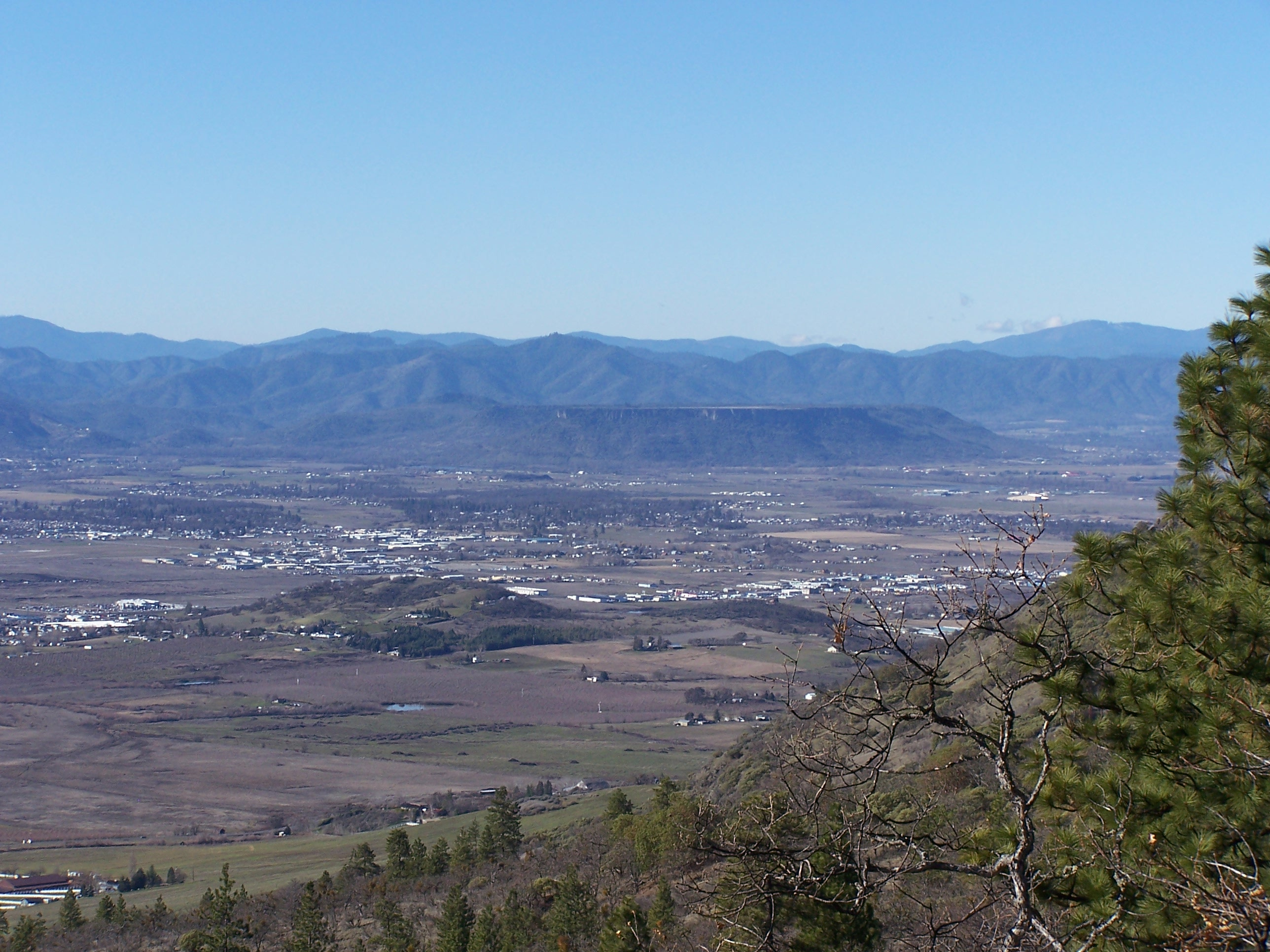
Lower Table Rock across the Rogue Valley from Roxy Ann Peak

Starting approximately 40 million years ago in the middle Eocene, a braided river system called the "Ancestral Rogue River" flowed through the region where the Rogue Valley is now carved. For about 2.1 million years, the river deposited what is now known as the Payne Cliffs Formation by laying down a thin conglomerate, followed by arkosic sandstone and siltstone. Between 10 and 20 million years ago, the uplift that created the nearby Klamath Mountains caused an incision that formed the Rogue River valley. Vertical erosion, or downcutting of the Rogue River continues to keep pace with the recent uplift, with about 690 feet (210 m) of erosion occurring in the past seven million years.

Approximately seven million years ago in the upper Miocene, a 44-mile (71 km) long trachyandesitic lava flow that likely came from Olson Mountain near present-day Lost Creek Lake flowed down the Ancestral Rogue River and its tributaries and spread throughout the valley. This lava formed a hard cap over the Payne Cliffs Formation. At Lost Creek Lake, the lava attained its maximum thickness of 730 feet (220 m) and thinned to about 100 to 200 feet (30 to 61 m) to the north of Medford.

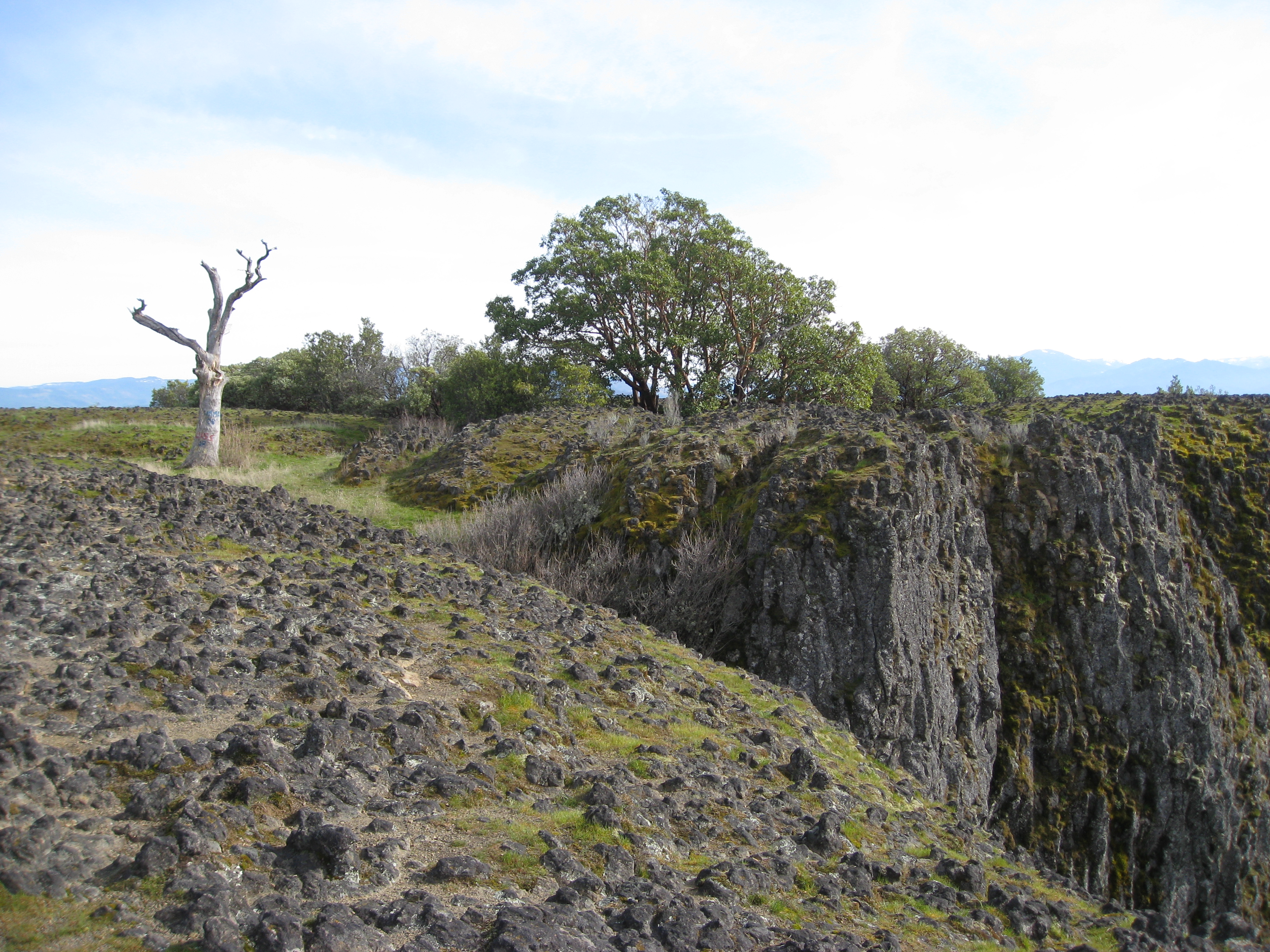
Andesite lava cap

Since the Olson eruption, the Rogue River has eroded 90 percent of the solidified lava. Though the andesite prevented much erosion to the caps of the Table Rocks, the andesite-capped cliffs eroded from the side as the softer sedimentary units of the Payne Cliffs Formation gave way. This erosion created expansive talus fields which surround the mesas on all sides, creating slopes capable of supporting abundant plant and animal life. Upper and Lower Table Rock both stand 800 feet (240 m) above the valley floor, and just over 2,000 feet (610 m) above sea level. There are approximately 300 acres (120 ha) of level ground on Lower Table Rock, and 500 acres (200 ha) on Upper Table Rock.

The Table Rocks offer an example of inverted relief, in which previous topographic lows are filled with a resistant rock and become new topographic highs after the erosion of the surrounding region. It is thought by some that each mesa is shaped roughly like a horseshoe because the lava followed the meanders of the Ancestral Rogue River. The lava caps, however, thicken to the south far greater than the depth of the ancestral Rogue River and thin to the north toward their respective bends, a morphology that is inconsistent with a channel-confined lava following the meanders of a river bed. Rather, the andesite of Table Rocks filled much of the valley of the Rogue as a broad sheet and displaced the Rogue River. Later, the Rogue River re-established itself and flushed most of the lava rock downstream. What remains today are Upper and Lower Table Rocks and Castle Rock to the west, sporadic monoliths along the valley, and thick ridge-capping flows below Lost Creek Lake Dam and at Olson Mountain.

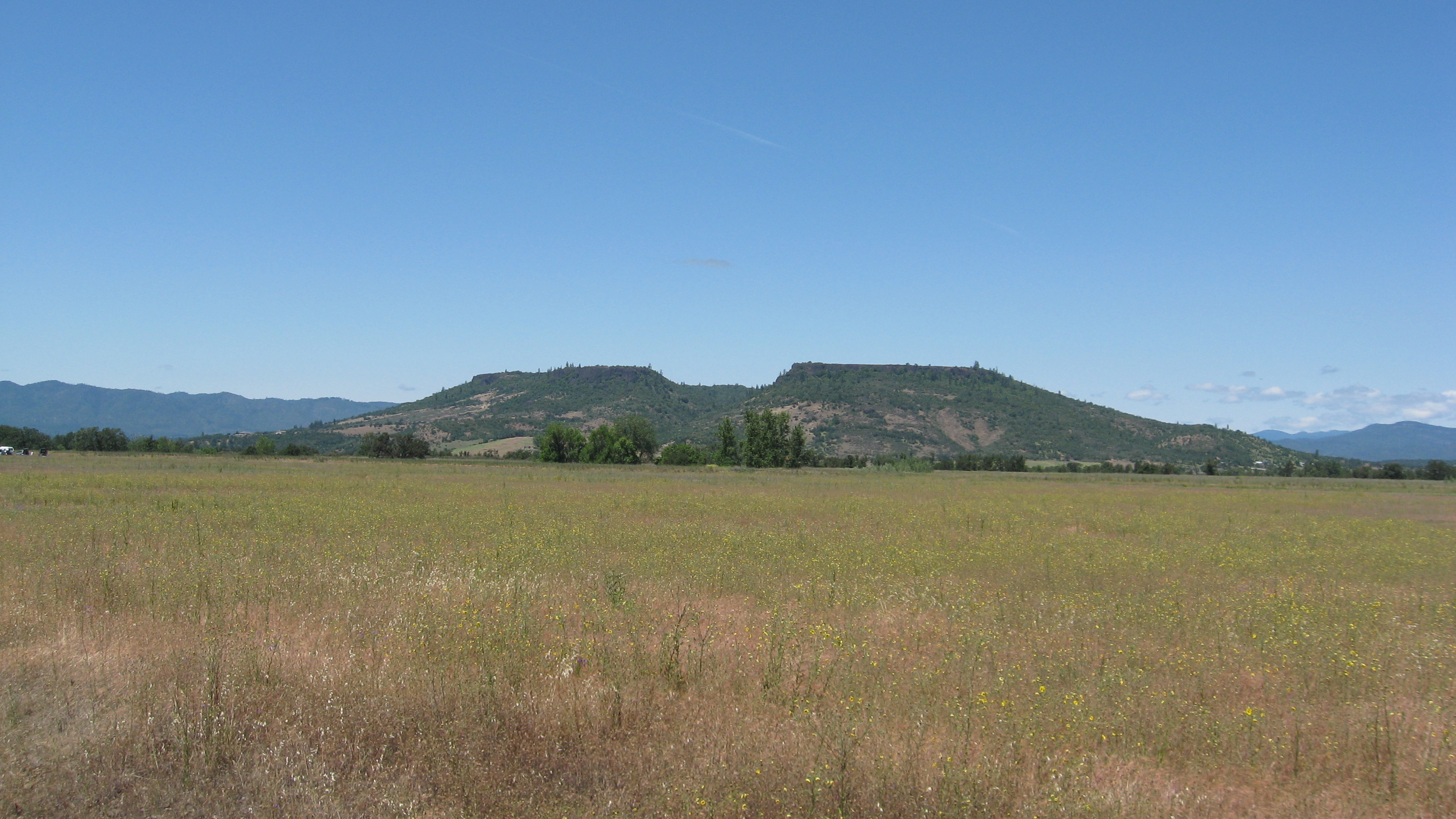
Upper Table Rock from the Denman Wildlife Area

Two caves and two former gold mines are located at the base of the andesite cap on Upper Table Rock. The caves were created by natural fractures in the cap, and the gold mines were excavated by prospectors searching for gold in the 19th century. Three are large enough to walk into, with an average width of 8 feet (2 m), while one is a small pit, dropping 30 feet (9.1 m) vertically into a pond of water.

== Human history ==
Humans have lived in the Table Rock area for at least 15,000 years, based on the age of Clovis points that were discovered nearby. The region surrounding the Table Rocks was home to the Takelma people. They gathered food such as acorns and tarweed seeds, and caught salmon in the nearby Rogue River. The Takelma also used deer hides for clothing. They had several names for the rocks, including Di'tani ("rock above"), Titanakh ("little Indian plums"), and possibly Kwenphunkh. The first use of the names Upper Table Rock and Lower Table Rock is unknown, however the first recorded use was by mountain man James Clyman in 1845.

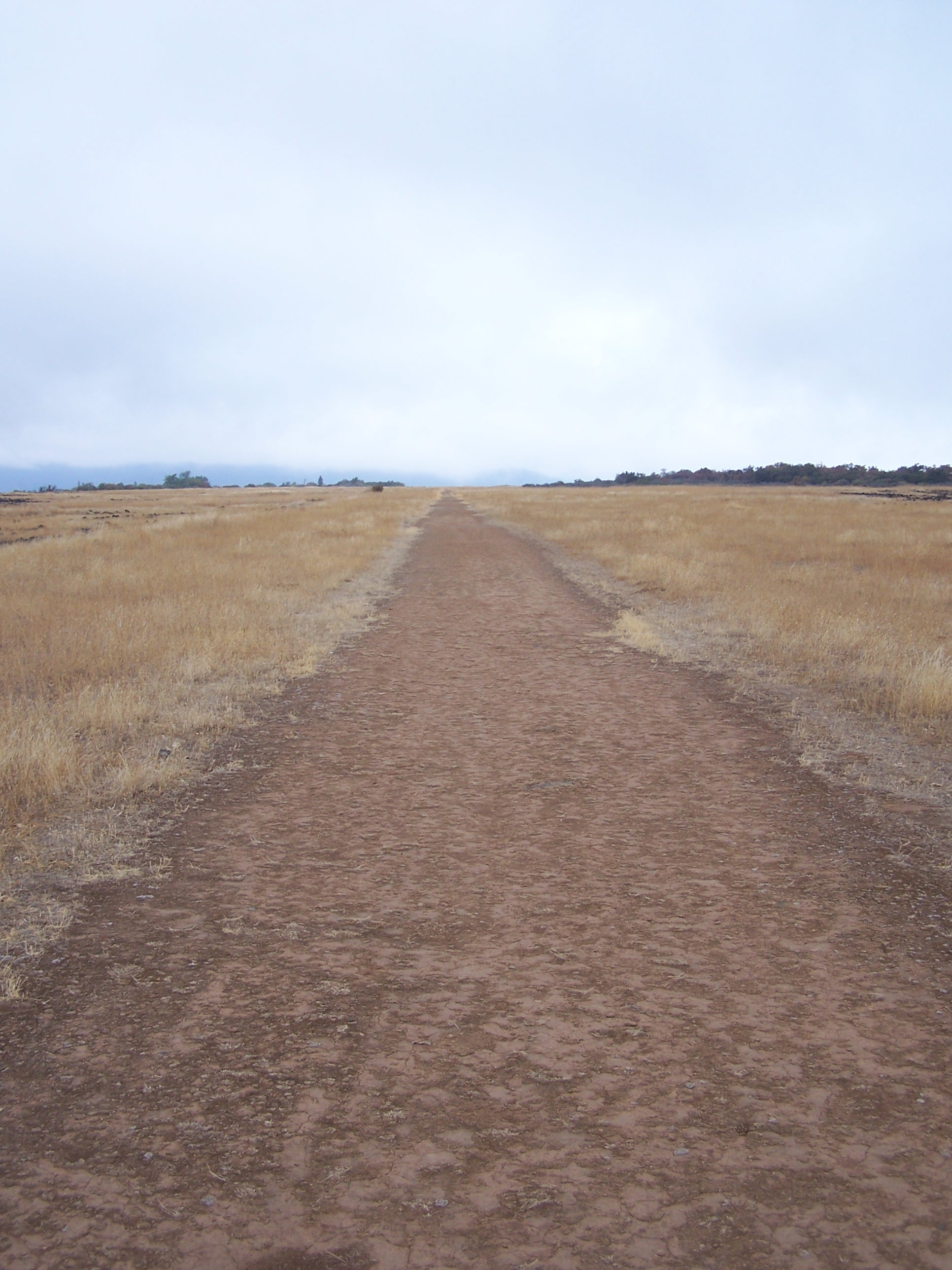
The airstrip on Lower Table Rock

Some of the first European Americans to visit the area were fur trappers led by Peter Skene Ogden in 1827. In 1841, the United States Exploring Expedition passed through the Rogue Valley. Neither Ogden nor the expedition mentioned the Table Rocks. The gold rush of the early 1850s brought many emigrants to the area, and Table Rock City (soon renamed Jacksonville) was established several miles south of the rocks. The sudden increase of settlers created conflicts with the Rogue River Indians. These conflicts turned into warfare, and several treaties were signed in an attempt to end the hostilities. In June 1851, soldiers of the United States Army led by Major Philip Kearny attacked the Takelma near Lower Table Rock, but the Takelma were prepared. One soldier died, and three others were injured. Major Kearny returned with volunteers from Yreka soon after, accompanied by Oregon Territory delegate Joseph Lane.

Hostilities resumed in 1853, culminating in the Battle of Table Rock, which actually took place in the Evans Creek drainage. In September 1853, the Native Americans signed a peace treaty with Joseph Lane, and the Treaty with the Rogue River with Joel Palmer, which resulted in their ceding 2,500 square miles (6,500 km^{2}) of land in exchange for $60,000, $15,000 of which was to be used to repay white settlers for losses sustained in the hostilities and $5,000 of which was set aside to purchase agricultural implements and other improvements benefitting the Native Americans. The Takelma population underwent their first forced migration into the Table Rock Reservation, located between Upper Table Rock and nearby Evans Creek. This reservation remained open for three years, while the inhabitants were moved to other reservations. In January 1856, 400 Native Americans were moved to the Grande Ronde Reservation, 263 miles (423 km) to the north. Most of the rest were relocated to the Siletz Reservation in May.

Development of the area commenced immediately and in 1872 the Table Rock Post Office was established just south of Upper Table Rock and east of Lower Table Rock. The Table Rock School District was created in 1879. In 1895 the post office's name was changed to Tablerock, and it was closed in 1906. Telephones arrived in 1908, and the Table Rock Mutual Telephone Company was established. The school district was merged with Central Point's district in 1948.

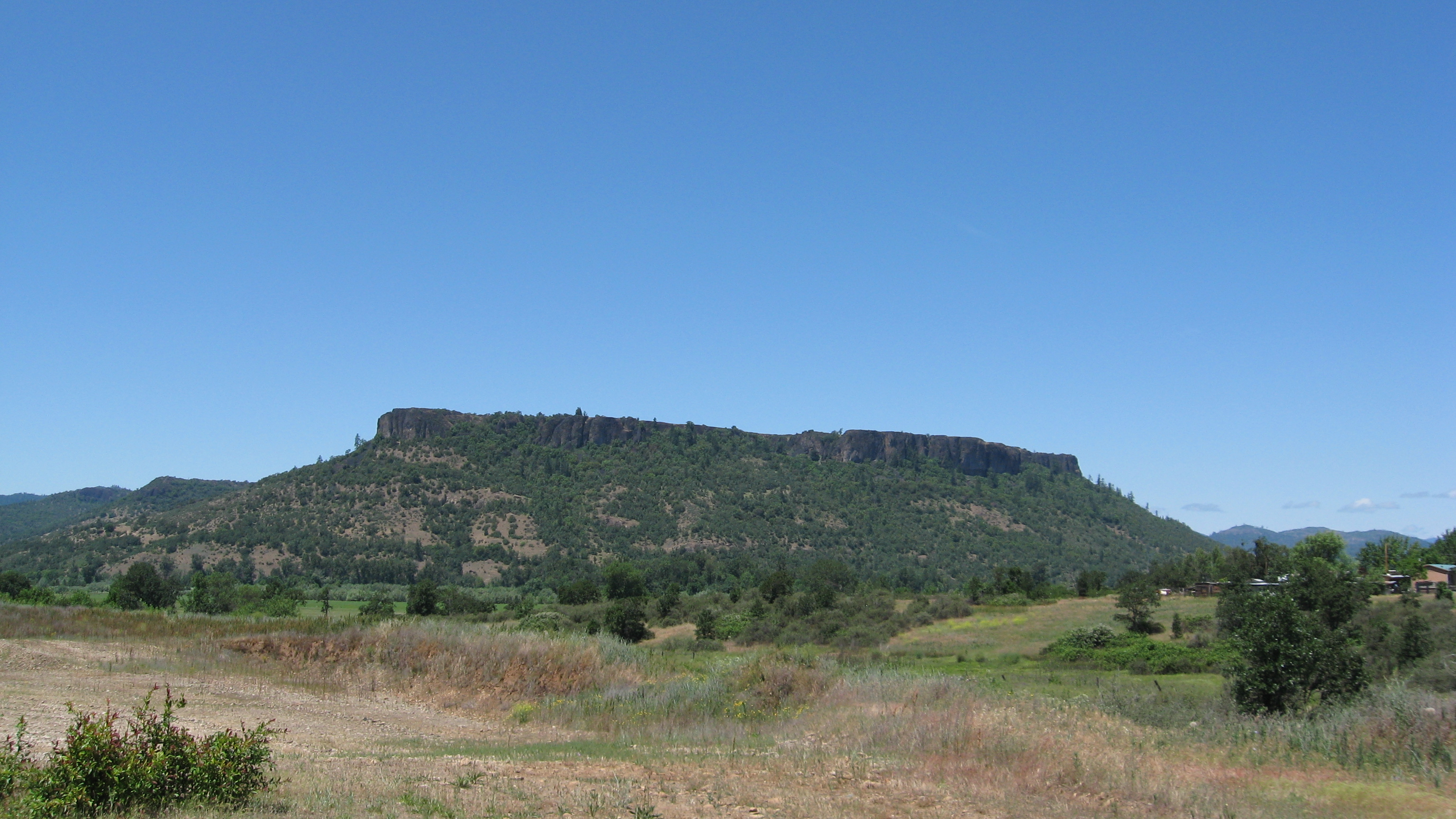
Lower Table Rock from Kirtland Road to the south

In November 1948, John Day, a local cattle rancher and developer, built a 3/4-mile (1.2 km) airstrip on the surface of Lower Table Rock to impress visiting celebrities from Hollywood. Day funded residential lots near the landmark with the intent of marketing the lots to the celebrities who used the grassy runway. The runway was closed in the late 1980s, but small airplanes still occasionally attempt to land on it.

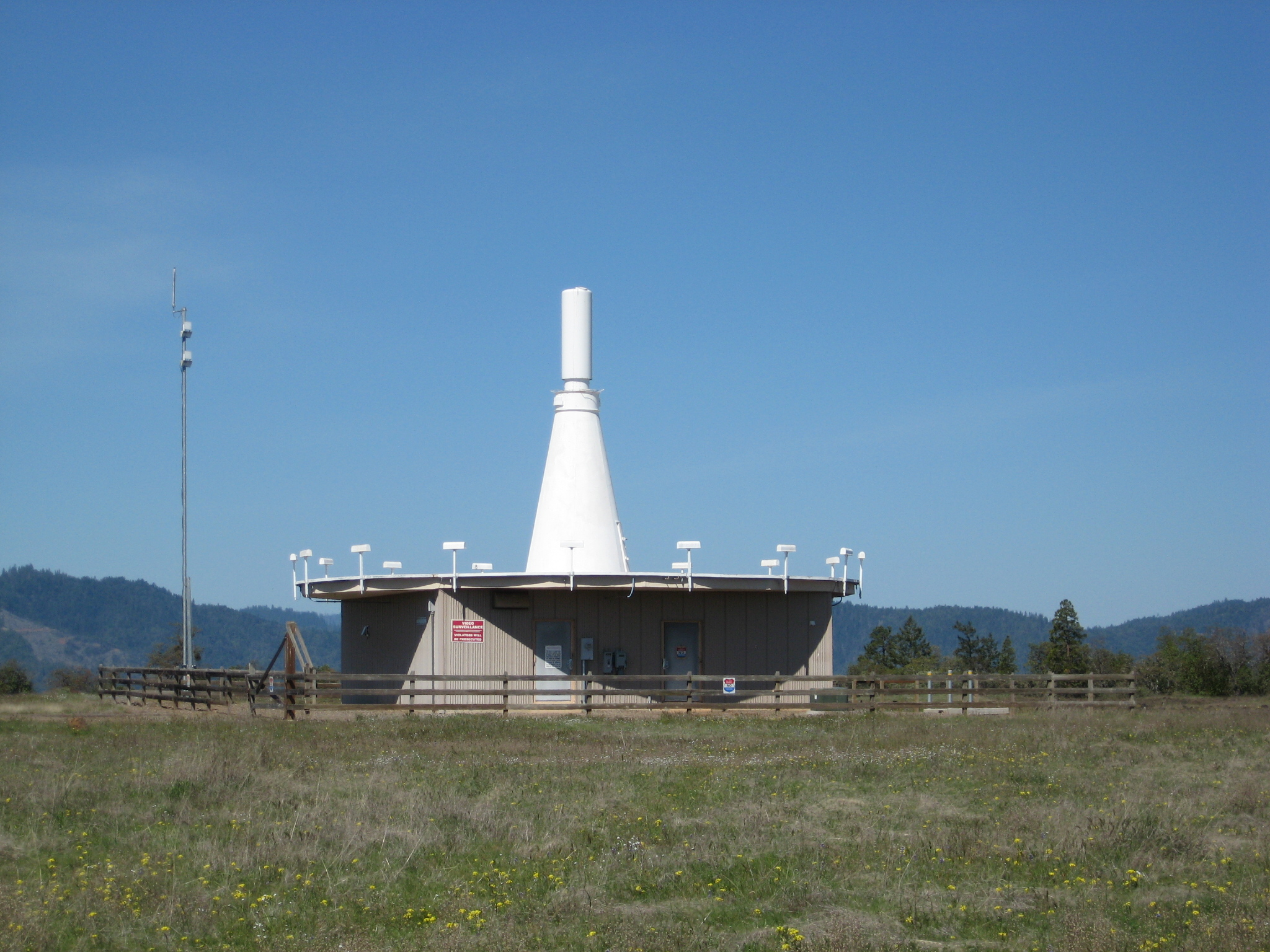
VORTAC located on Upper Table Rock

The Federal Aviation Administration has operated a 25-foot (7.6 m) tall very high frequency omnidirectional range (VOR) aviation tower on Upper Table Rock since the 1960s. The tower's purpose is to broadcast precise coordinates to nearby aircraft to assist in navigation. The facility is closed to the public due to the threat to the safety of the occupants of the aircraft. However, the structure sustained $40,000 damage in 1997 when vandals unsuccessfully attempted to steal aluminum antennas from the 15-foot (4.6 m) tall fiberglass shell on the roof of the building.

The Nature Conservancy became concerned about overdevelopment in 1978 and launched its largest fundraising project to that date. After collecting over $500,000 they purchased 1,881 acres (761 ha) of Lower Table Rock, creating the Lower Table Rock Preserve. Projects include prescribed burning and invasive species removal. In 1981, the Youth Conservation Corps constructed the Upper Table Rock Trail. A year later, through the efforts of John Ifft, the Lower Table Rock Trail was constructed; the first 400 feet (120 m) were built by a Central Point Boy Scout troop, and the rest was built by the Oregon Department of Forestry. In 1984, the Table Rocks were designated an Area of Critical Environmental Concern by the Bureau of Land Management. In May 2009, The Nature Conservancy bought another 1,710 acres (690 ha) of land on the Table Rocks for $3.9 million, ending private ownership of the rocks.

== Ecological habitats ==
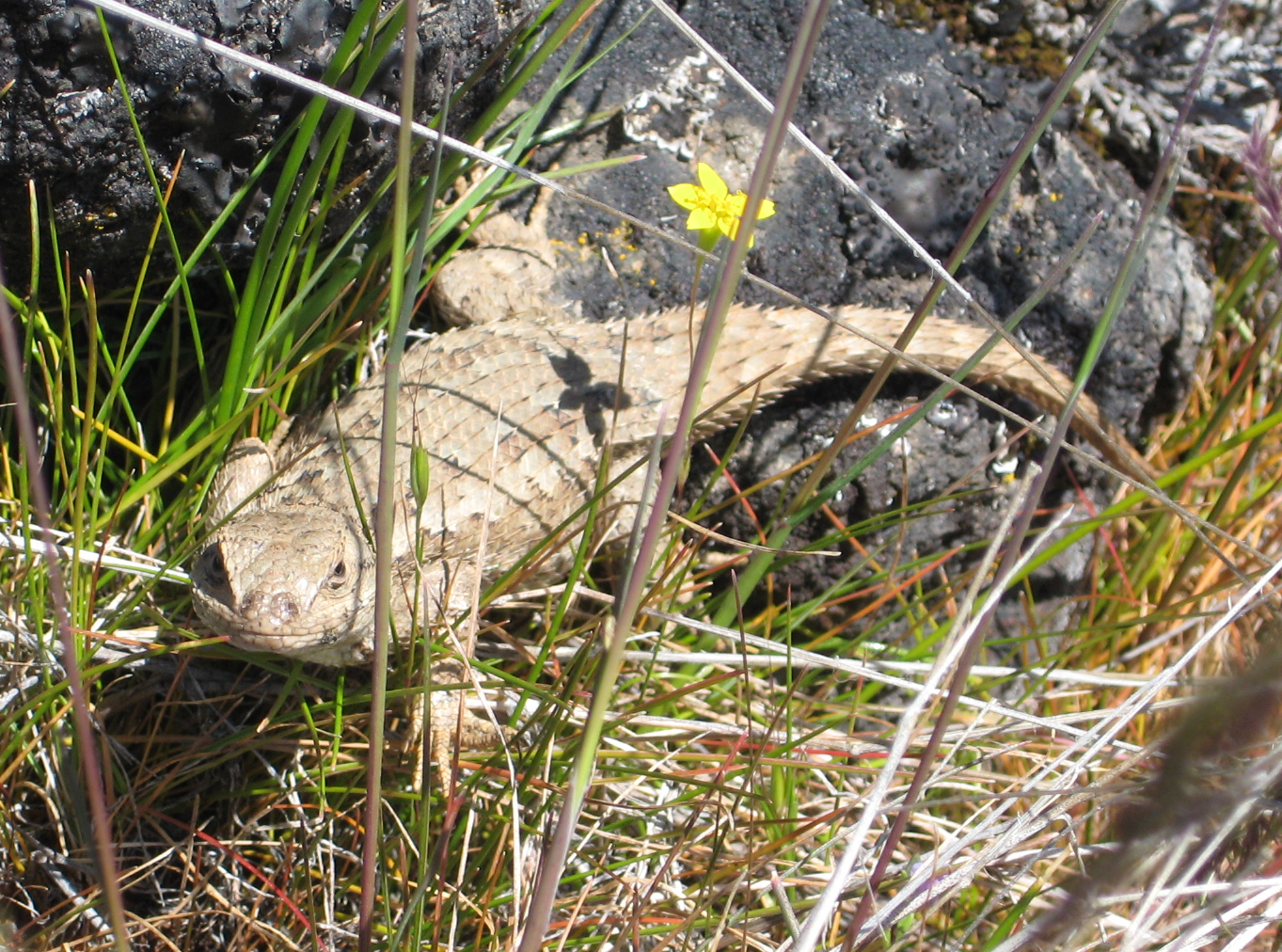
Western fence lizard on Lower Table Rock. A western buttercup flower is blooming above it.

Four overlapping ecological regions have been identified on the Table Rocks, with considerable differences in the variety of wildlife found in each. From the outermost base of the rocks, three regions consisting of oak savanna, chaparral, and mixed woodland surround the relatively flat tops. The andesite cap is covered by the fourth region, mounded prairie. This region formed when the caps were slowly eroded by the freezing and thawing of water that seeped into the ground (ice erosion), which created layers of mounded soil. Vernal pools fill in from October to June in the mounded prairie area due to the andesite's impermeability. The pools support species of plants and animals.

Over 340 species of plants grow on the rocks, including approximately 200 species of wildflowers. Some of the most common wildflowers are western buttercups, desert parsley, bicolor lupine, and California goldfields. Camas and death camas also grow on the rocks. Camas produces an edible bulb, while death camas is poisonous and was used by the Takelma as an anesthetic.

More than 70 species of animals are known to live on the Table Rocks. Lizards such as the western fence lizard, southern alligator lizard, and western skink have been seen in all four regions of the Table Rocks. Western rattlesnakes and two species of garter snakes also live in all regions. Black-tailed deer, coyotes, and bobcats are some of the mammals that live on the Table Rocks. The rocks are also home to western black-legged ticks, although they are mainly found in the chaparral region. Many species of birds live on the rocks.

The Table Rocks experience a Mediterranean climate. The average wind speed in the area is less than 6 miles per hour (10 km/h), and the annual precipitation is approximately 18 inches (460 mm) due to the rain shadow created by the Klamath Mountains. It rarely snows in the winter.

=== Oak savanna ===
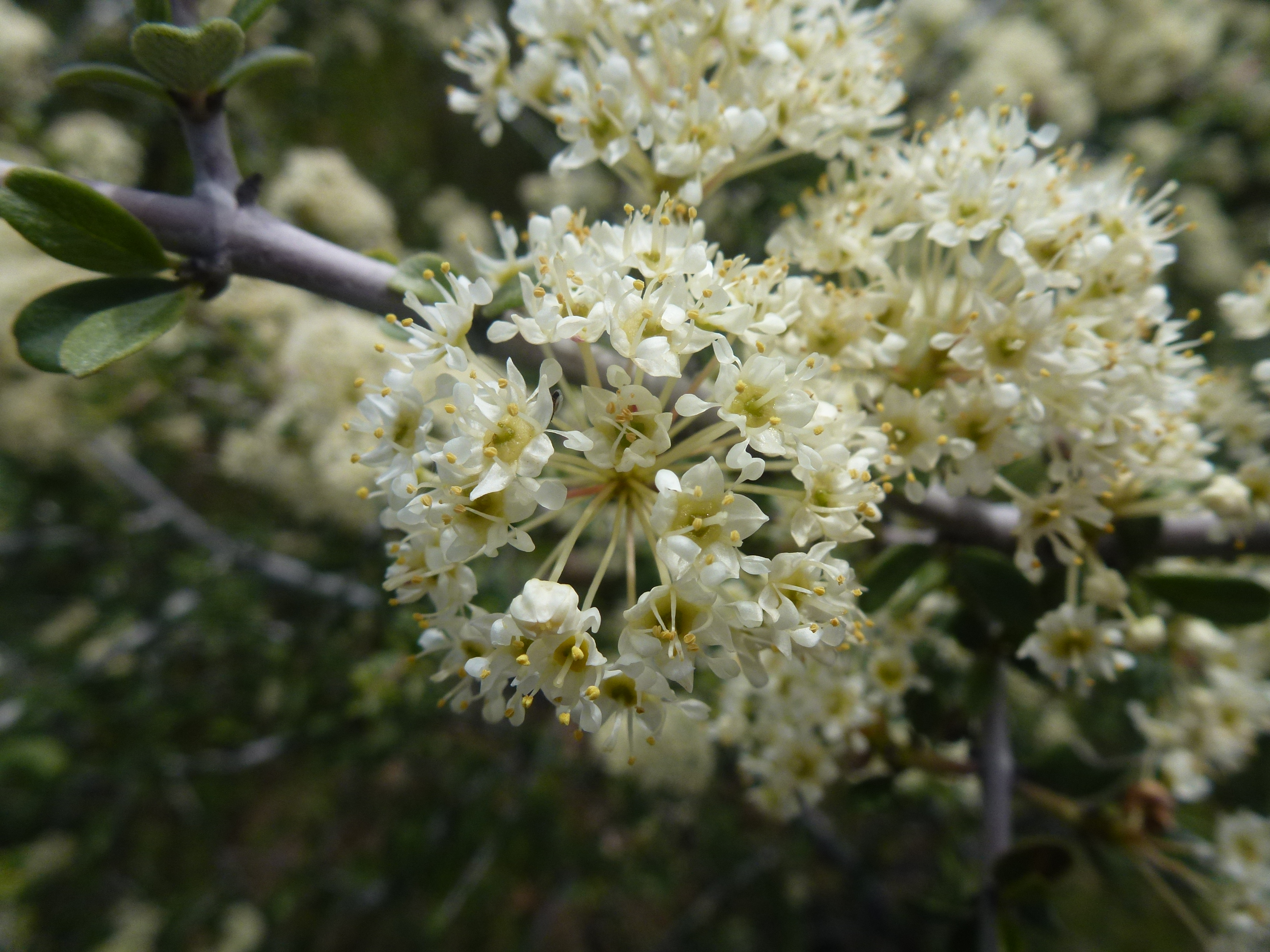
Buckbrush in bloom on Lower Table Rock

Oak savanna is a type of grassland with scattered oak trees, found on the lowest slopes of the Table Rocks. The Takelma tribe often set fires in the oak savanna and chaparral regions to prevent brush overgrowth, creating foraging areas for animals such as deer and elk. It also prevented large wildfires. Oregon white oak and ponderosa pine are the most common trees found in the region. Buckbrush, sticky whiteleaf manzanita, Pacific madrone, deerbrush, birchleaf mountain mahogany, and Pacific poison oak are also common.

Snakes such as the ringneck snake, western yellow-bellied racer, striped whipsnake, and Pacific gopher snake live in the oak savanna region. Birds such as the oak titmouse, ash-throated flycatcher, white-breasted nuthatch, western bluebird, violet-green swallow, acorn woodpecker, black-headed grosbeak, and American kestrel have also been found in this region. The rocks are known to be the northernmost place blue-gray gnatcatchers inhabit. Gall wasps live in this area, often creating galls in oak trees by injecting their larva into their leaves and branches.

=== Chaparral ===
Chaparral is a type of shrubland, receiving very little precipitation. Sclerophyllous plants such as manzanita and buckbrush grow in this area, both relying on fire to reproduce. The rare Gentner's fritillary also grows in this region.

American black bears have been spotted in the chaparral region, usually in the fall. The most common birds include titmice and the acorn woodpecker. Blue-gray gnatcatchers, lesser goldfinches, and Anna's hummingbirds have also been seen.

=== Mixed woodland ===
The mixed woodland region is a dense forest with many species of trees, located near the tops of the mesas. The forest canopy shades the ground, resulting in a cooler temperature. The canopy also reduces the amount of water evaporation. California black oak, Douglas fir, Pacific madrone, incense cedar, and other plants grow in the mixed woodland. Shrubs such as Oregon grape, honeysuckle, blue elderberry, and Pacific poison oak also grow here. The soil in this area is mostly loam.

Rodents such as the California ground squirrel, western gray squirrel, and dusky-footed woodrat live in this region. Birds such as grosbeaks, flycatchers, western tanagers, and lazuli buntings are common in the area. Nine species of warblers, three species of vireos, and two species of thrushes can also be found. The pileated woodpecker has been spotted rarely in large pine trees.

=== Mounded prairie and vernal pools ===
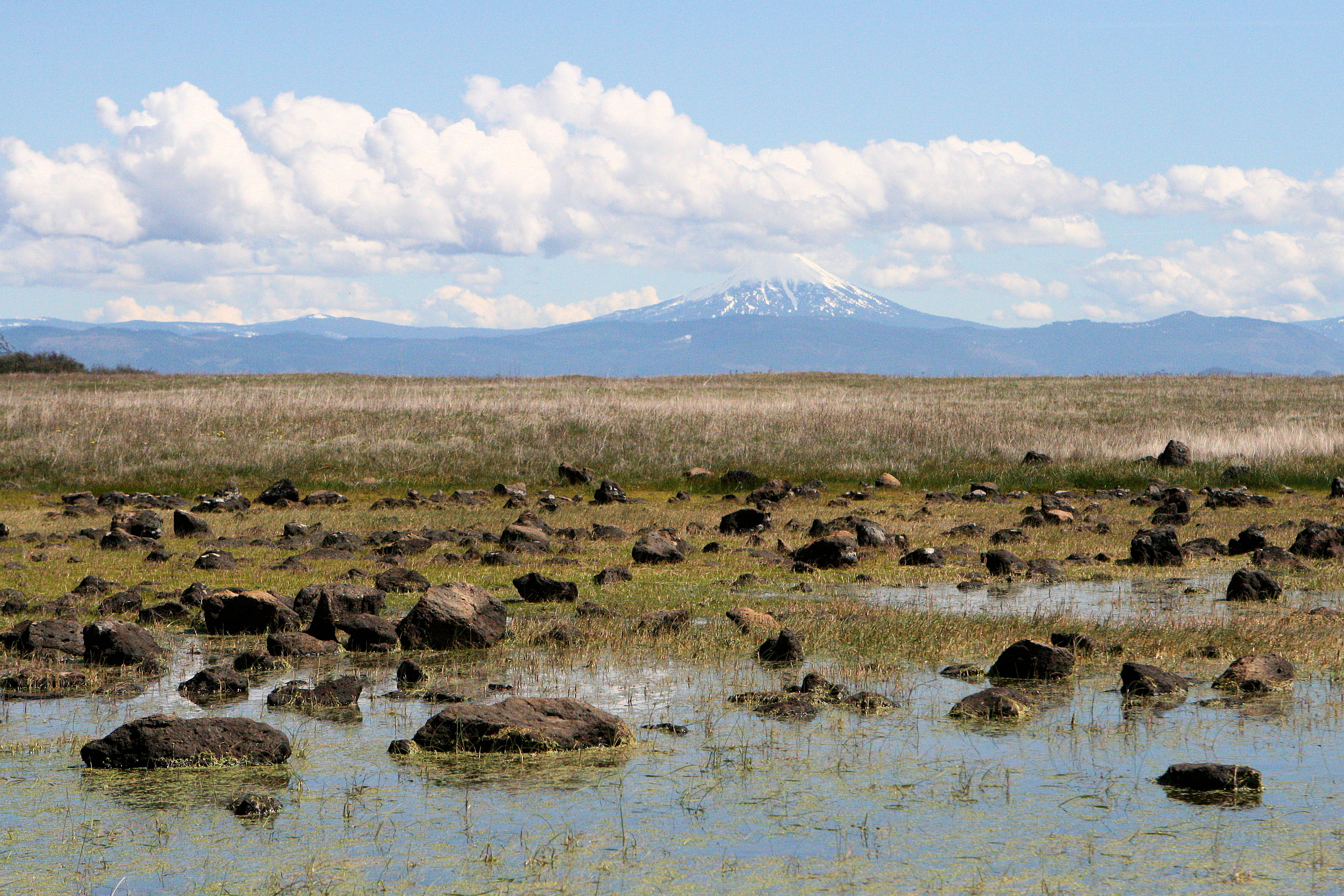
Vernal pool and mounded prairie on Lower Table Rock mesa. Mount McLoughlin can be seen in the background.

The mounded prairie region is located on top of the mesas, characterized by many species grasses and wildflowers around the vernal pools, with mounds of soil created by erosion. The dwarf woolly meadowfoam, a plant endemic to the Table Rocks, grows near these pools. They bloom for about ten days in April. When filled in the winter and early spring, the pools are also a known habitat for the vernal pool fairy shrimp (Branchinecta lynchi), a threatened species.

Two types of amphibians are found in the mounded prairie region, typically around vernal pools. The Pacific tree frog lives in large numbers on the rocks, while tadpoles of the rarer western toad can be seen between March and May. Mammals such as California voles, Heermann's kangaroo rats, raccoons, and long-tailed weasels can also be found in this region. The western meadowlark and two species of sparrows are the most common types of birds that are seen in the area. Turkey vultures, rock wren, three species of hawks, and other birds patrol the cliffs on the sides of the mesas.

== Trails ==
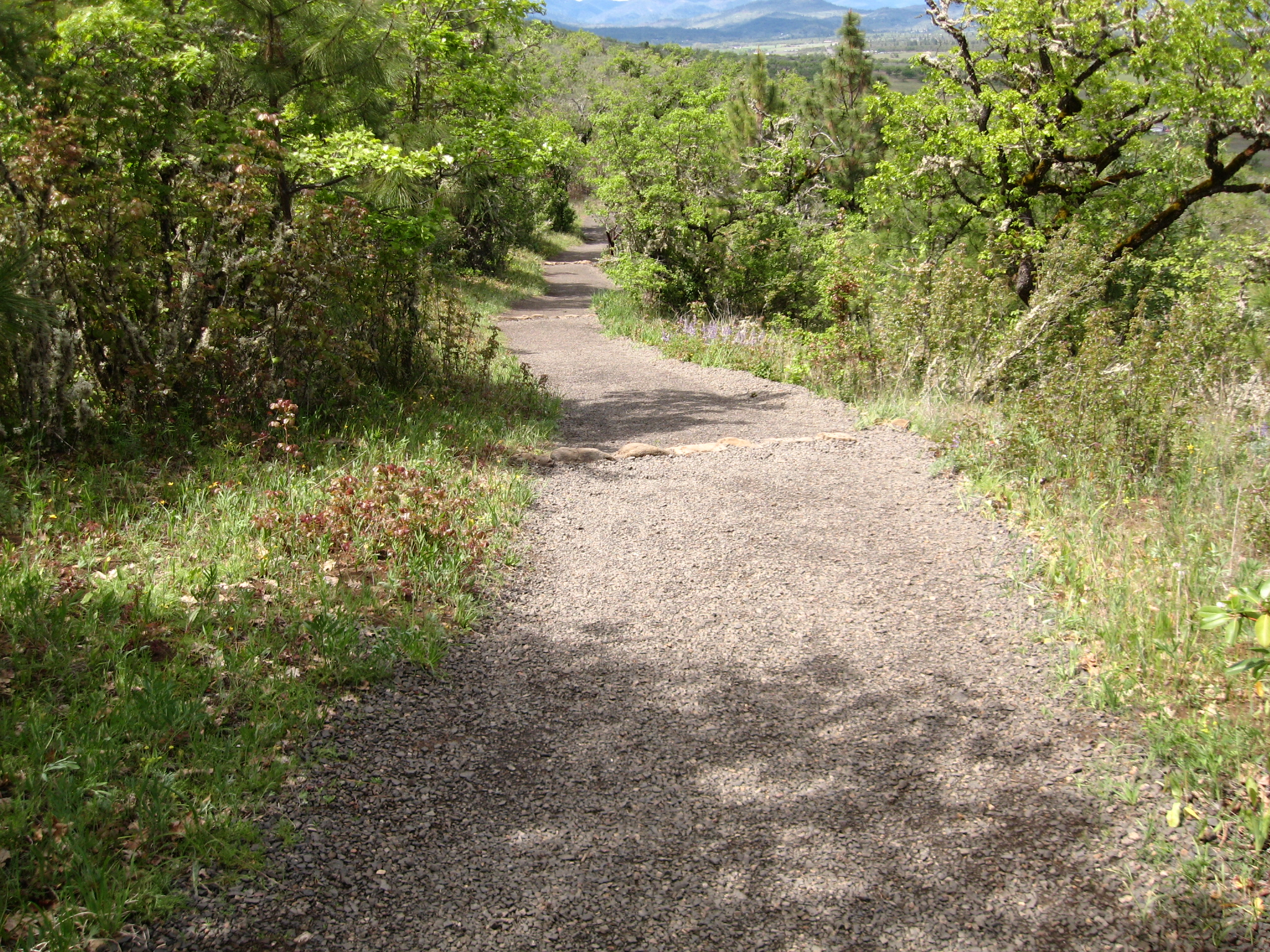
Upper Table Rock Trail

The Table Rocks offer one of the most popular hiking locations in the Rogue Valley, with over 45,000 visitors annually. Over 4,600 people per year participate in guided hikes through the Table Rock Environmental Education Program, hosted by the Bureau of Land Management and The Nature Conservancy. Lower Table Rock features a walking trail, which climbs approximately 780 feet (240 m) to the top of the mesa over a distance of 1.75 miles (2.8 km). It has eight interpretive panels along its length, explaining the history, flora, and fauna of the region. Upper Table Rock also has a walking trail, 1.25 miles (2.0 km) long, ascending approximately 720 feet (220 m). The trails are the most popular with hikers between March and May, when the wildflowers are in bloom. Another peak occurs in September through October. Landmarks such as Mount McLoughlin, Mount Ashland, Roxy Ann Peak, and Pilot Rock are visible on clear days from the edge of the rocks.

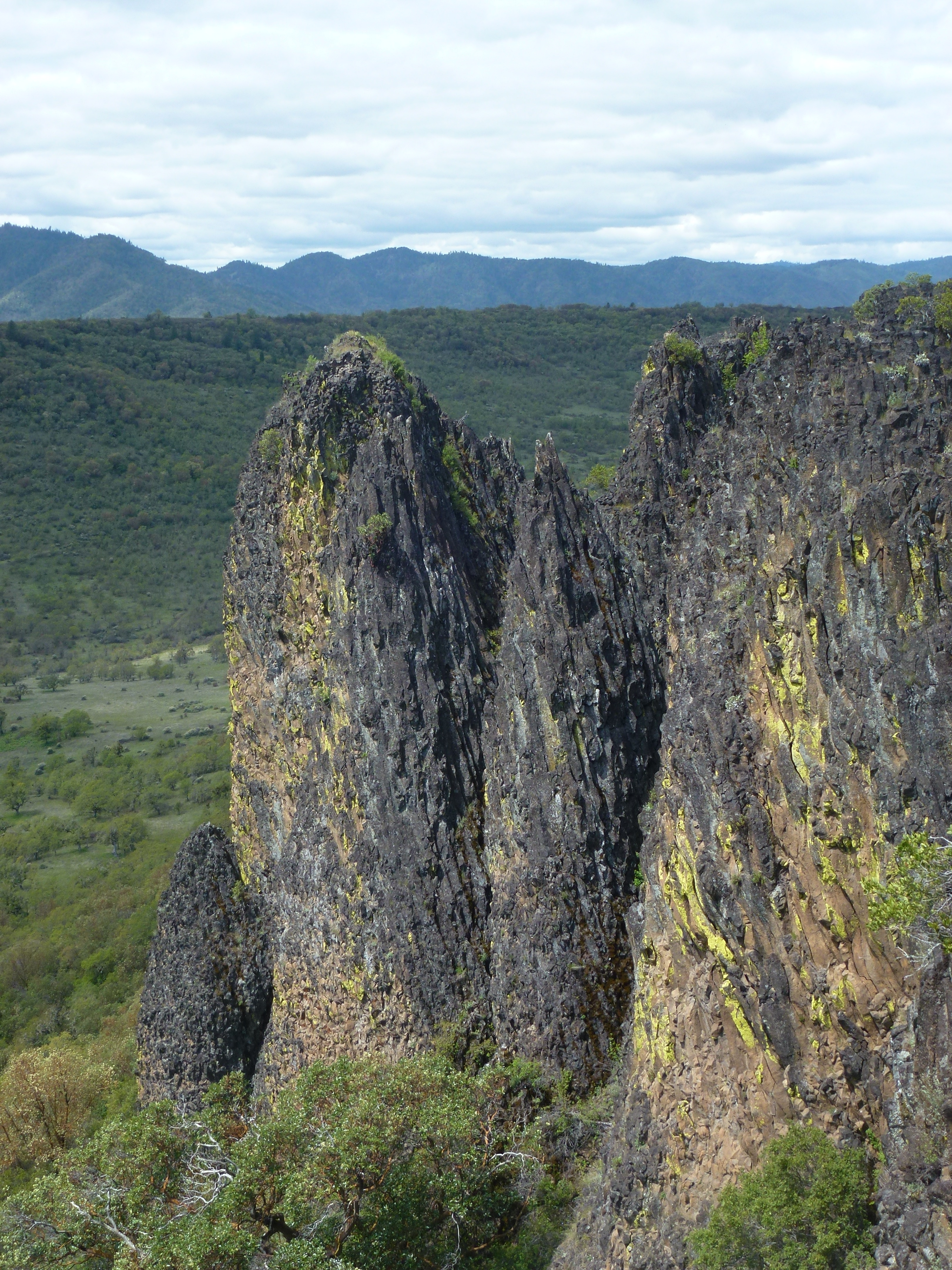
Several large andesite columns separating from Lower Table Rock

The Youth Conservation Corps, Boy Scouts, and the Oregon Department of Forestry built the trails leading to the tops of the Table Rocks in the early 1980s, around the same time the mesas were being nominated as an Area of Critical Environmental Concern. In June 1999, only two small trees were cut when Shady Cove contractor Randy Hodges rerouted a 3/4-mile (1.2 km) section of the Lower Table Rock trail to accommodate the growing number of visitors. The project involved decommissioning the old section, expanding the parking lot, and installing 2,200 feet (671 m) of new trail. Measures to protect the trail were implemented, such as installing rock waterbars and a layer of shale gravel over the clay.

In 2005, a program to build an interpretive trail began on Lower Table Rock near the trailhead. Prior to construction, some persons with disabilities, children, or the elderly may have been prevented from using either of the Table Rocks due to the steep terrain and narrow paths. The finished project involved making a 500-foot (150 m) section of trail accessible and adding a 1/2-mile (800 m) long section of new trail for general public use.

Both trails lead to extensive views of the surrounding areas, but have inherent dangers as well. The thick andesite caps are heavily eroded, leaving tall crumbling columns near their edges. At least six people have fallen from the Table Rocks since 2006, including a man from Central Point who tumbled through a rock shaft on Lower Table Rock to his death in May 2007 and was not found for over nineteen months. Another man from Murray, Utah fell 200 feet (61 m) from Lower Table Rock and died in September 2009.

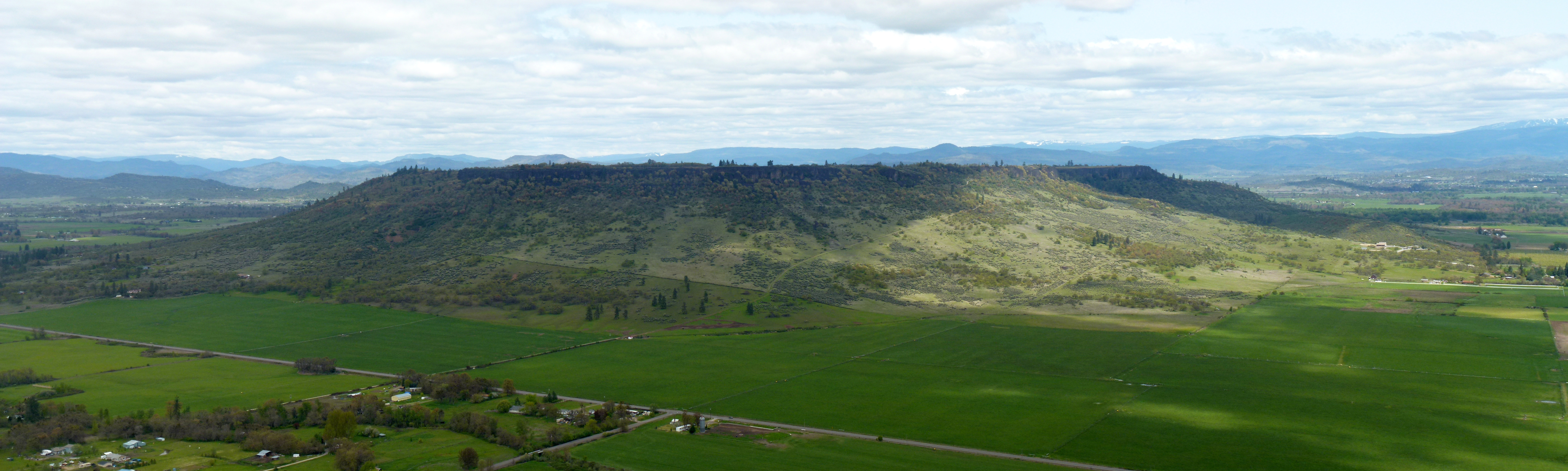
A panorama of Upper Table Rock from Lower Table Rock
