= Pilot Rock =

Pilot Rock may refer to:

- Pilot Rock, Butler County, Iowa, a populated place
- Pilot Rock, Cherokee County, Iowa, a former post office
- Pilot Rock, Oregon, a city in Umatilla County
- Pilot Rock (Jackson County, Oregon), a volcanic plug
