= Baldy (Jackson County, Oregon) =

Mountain in Oregon

- Location within Oregon

Highest point
- Elevation: 3,820 feet (1,164 m) NGVD 29
- Coordinates: 42°17′53″N 122°44′59″W

Geography
- Location: Jackson County, Oregon, U.S.
- Parent range: Cascade Range
- Topo map: USGS Rio Canyon

Baldy is a 3,820-foot (1,164 m) mountain located 4.1 miles (6.6 km) north-northeast of Talent and 3.8 miles (6.1 km) east-northeast of Phoenix in Jackson County, Oregon.

It forms part of the eastern edge of the Rogue Valley, and is about 7.3 miles (11.7 km) west-northwest of Grizzly Peak and 4.4 miles (7.1 km) south-southeast of Roxy Ann Peak.
