= Mountain Lakes Wilderness =

Protected wilderness area in Oregon, United States

- IUCN category Ib (wilderness area)
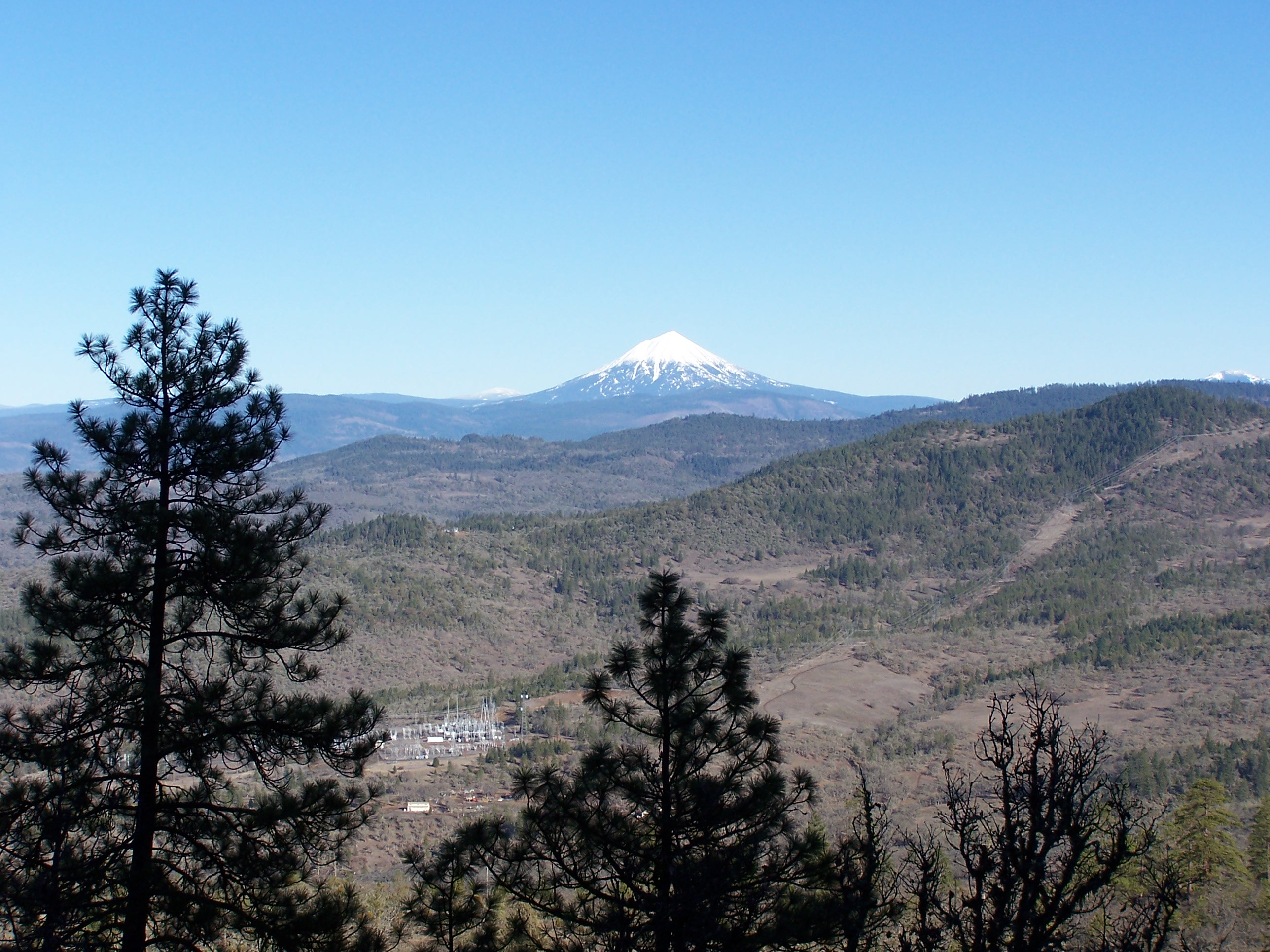
- Aspen Caldera with Mt. McLoughlin in the background

- Location within the United States
- Location: Klamath County, Oregon, US
- Nearest city: Klamath Falls, Oregon
- Coordinates: 42°21′0″N 122°6′0″W
- Area: 23,071 acres (9,337 ha)
- Established: September 3, 1964
- Governing body: U.S. Forest Service

The Mountain Lakes Wilderness is a wilderness area located in the Fremont–Winema National Forest in the southern Cascade Range of Oregon in the United States. It surrounds a cluster of four overlapping shield volcanoes, the highest of which is 8,208-foot (2,502 m) Aspen Butte. Over 20 small lakes lie along the bottoms of several large cirques carved by Ice Age glaciers near the summits of the volcanoes.

The Mountain Lakes Wilderness is unique among United States wilderness areas in that it is the only one whose borders form a square, occupying the 36-square-mile (93 km^{2}) area of a single survey township.

== Recreation ==
Popular recreational activities in the Mountain Lakes Wilderness include hiking, cross-country skiing, camping, and fishing. Fish species are stocked in lakes every other year. Both brook and rainbow trout are stocked in Harriette, Como, and West Lakes. Mystic, Paragon, and South Pass Lakes are only stocked with brook trout. This Wilderness can be accessed by 3 different trails. The Trails are Clover Creek, Mountain Lakes, and Varney Creek.

== Trails ==
- Clover Creek Trail (4 Miles)
- Mountain Lakes Trail (6.5 Miles)
- Varney Creek Trail (4.5 Miles)

== See also ==
- List of Oregon Wildernesses
- List of U.S. Wilderness Areas
- Wilderness Act
- USFS
