= Pilot Rock (Oregon) =

Mountain in Oregon, USA

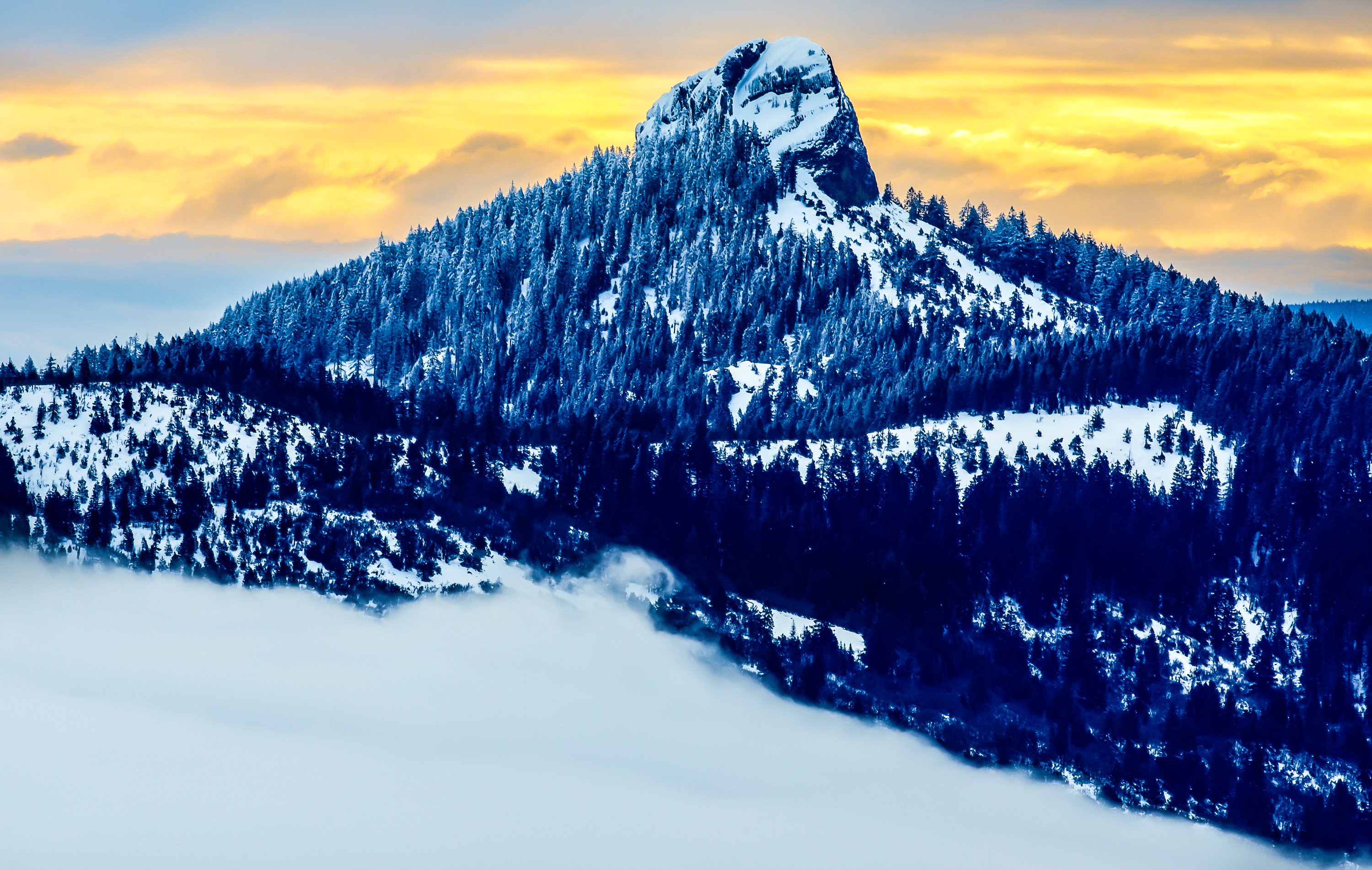
- Pilot Rock

Highest point
- Elevation: 5,910 ft (1,800 m)
- Prominence: 570 ft (170 m)
- Coordinates: 42°01′50″N 122°33′39″W

Geography
- Location within Oregon
- Location: Jackson County, Oregon, United States
- Parent range: Cascade Range
- Topo map: USGS Siskiyou Pass

Geology
- Rock age: 25.6 Ma
- Mountain type: Volcanic plug
- Volcanic arc: Cascade Volcanic Arc

Climbing
- Easiest route: Scramble

Pilot Rock is a prominent volcanic plug located in the western Cascade Range near the east end of the Siskiyou Mountains, just east of the Siskiyou Summit near Ashland, Oregon. Rising thousands of feet above the Shasta and Rogue valleys, it is a landmark distinguishable from over 40 miles (64 km) away. At 25.6 million years old, it is one of the oldest formations of the Cascade Range. The rock is protected by the Cascade–Siskiyou National Monument and the Soda Mountain Wilderness. Several trails pass near Pilot Rock, including the Pacific Crest Trail.

== Geology ==
Rising 570 feet (170 m) above the surrounding hills and thousands of feet above the Shasta and Rogue valleys, Pilot Rock is one of the most prominent features of the Cascade–Siskiyou National Monument. It was created when andesitic magma broke through a weak spot in the Earth's crust and solidified beneath the surface, forming a plug. The softer rock around the plug slowly eroded away, leaving Pilot Rock as it is seen today. Similar features include Devils Tower in Wyoming and Shiprock in New Mexico. Argon–argon dating shows that the rock is approximately 25.6 million years old, making it one of the oldest volcanic formations in the Cascades, but much younger than the 425 million-year-old Siskiyou Mountains nearby.

Pilot Rock has a large amount of columnar jointing, created when the magma cooled. The joints are tilted about 20 degrees to the east due to the gradual uplift of the Siskiyou Mountains to the west. The rock also has an unusually high amount of black hornblende crystals, indicating that there was a significant amount of water in the area when it formed. Extensive talus deposits have accumulated around the rock's base. The surrounding soil is primarily the sticky, eroded remnants of volcaniclastic breccia.

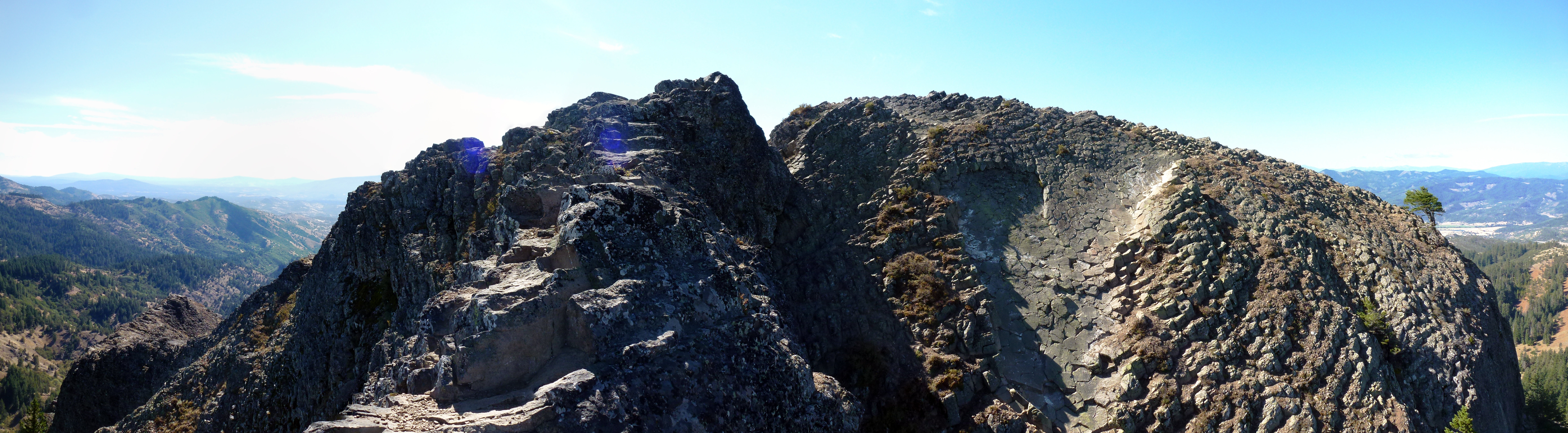
View of the summit of Pilot Rock showing its extensive columnar jointing

== History ==
The Takelma tribe of Native Americans originally called the rock Tan-ts'at-seniphtha (stone standing up), but to early settlers Pilot Rock was known as Boundary Mountain. The United States Exploring Expedition passed through the area on September 28, 1841, renaming the rock Emmons Peak after Lieutenant George F. Emmons, a U.S. naval officer and member of the group. Emmons described the rock as "a singular, isolated rock, which stands like a tower on the top of the ridge, rising above the surrounding forest with a bare and apparently unbroken surface." James Clyman also described the rock when he passed through the area on June 26, 1845. The rock later become known as Pilot Rock because it served as a landmark for pioneers coming north from California on the Applegate Trail, being visible from as far as the southern end of the Shasta Valley, over 40 miles (64 km) to the south.

Nine planes have crashed into Pilot Rock since 1942, mainly due to poor visibility.

Pilot Rock is protected by the Cascade–Siskiyou National Monument, created in 2000, and the Soda Mountain Wilderness, created in 2009.

== Flora ==
Pilot Rock is located in the eastern Klamath Mountains ecoregion and is surrounded by dense mixed coniferous forest. Wildflowers such as wild strawberries, larkspur, columbine, lupine, and paintbrush grow in the spring and summer. Gentner's fritillary, a rare species of the lily family, has been found growing on and near the rock.

== Trails ==
Path to Pilot Rock in June 2019

There are several trails near Pilot Rock which can be accessed via a forest road that ends at a parking lot approximately 1 mile (1.6 km) northwest of the rock. The main trail, part of the Pacific Crest Trail, travels southeast towards the rock for about 1/5 mile (0.32 km), before branching into two trails. The left branch is the northbound continuation of the Pacific Crest Trail, while the right fork is the summit trail. The steep summit trail is about 1 mile (1.6 km) long, and gains approximately 808 feet (246 m) in elevation. At the summit, there are views of landmarks such as Mount Shasta, the Trinity Alps, and Mount McLoughlin.

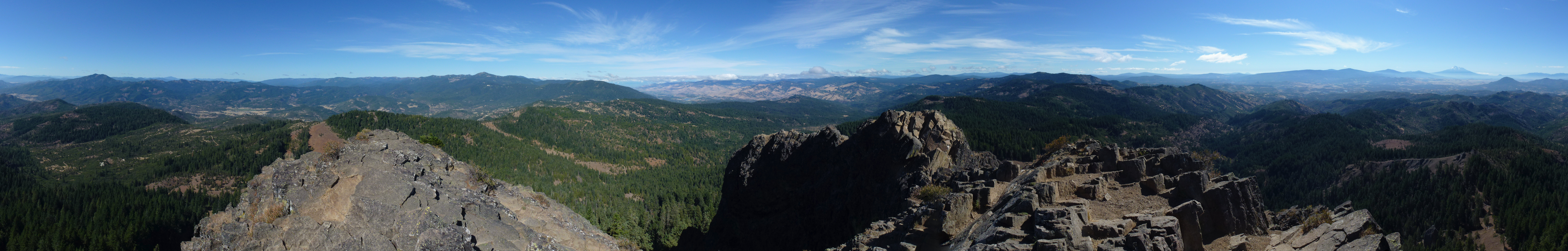
360-degree panorama from the summit of Pilot Rock

== See also ==
- Roxy Ann Peak
- Upper and Lower Table Rock
