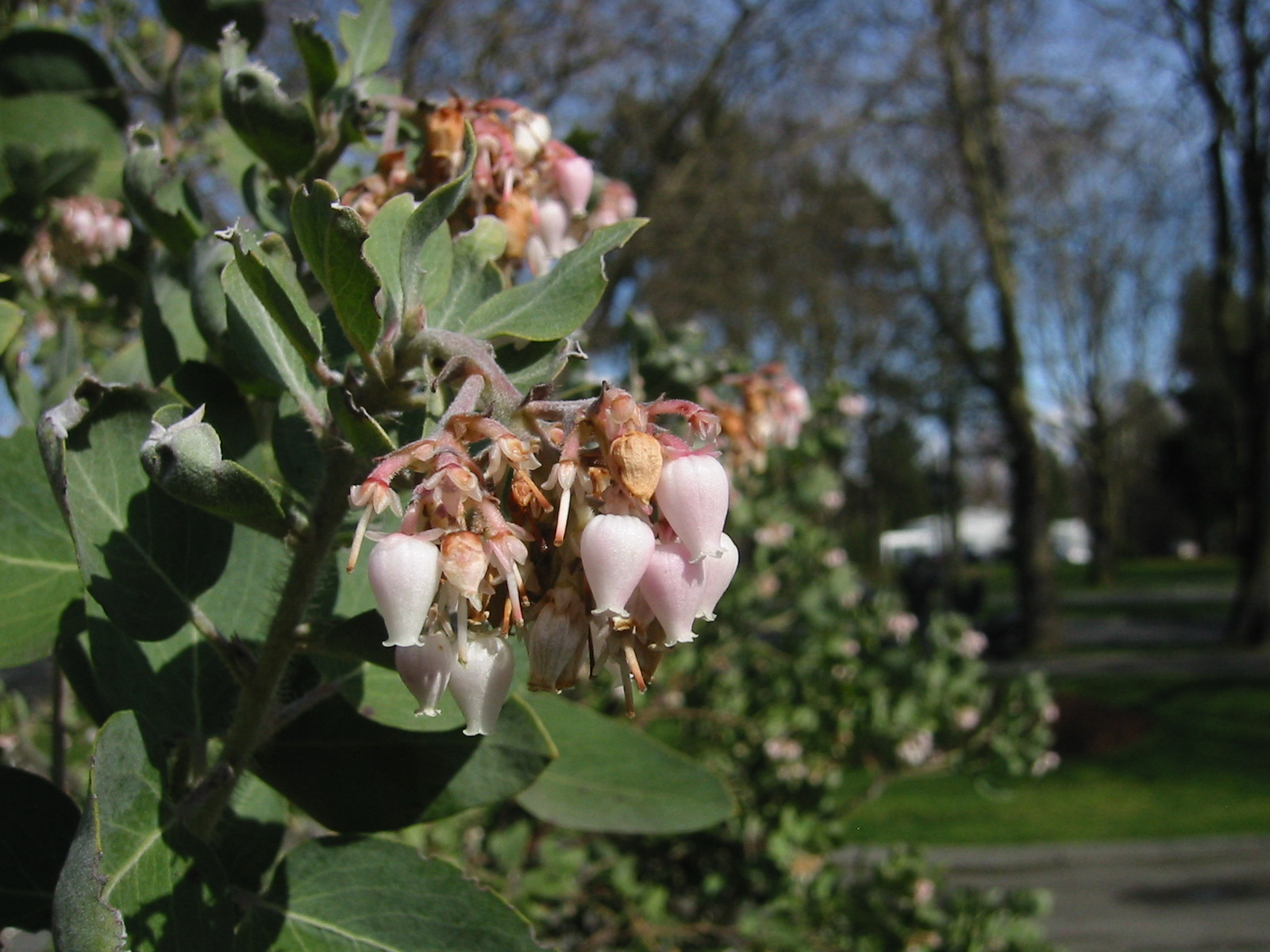

Conservation status
- Secure (NatureServe)

Scientific classification
- Kingdom: Plantae
- Clade: Tracheophytes
- Clade: Angiosperms
- Clade: Eudicots
- Clade: Asterids
- Order: Ericales
- Family: Ericaceae
- Genus: Arctostaphylos
- Species: A. viscida

Binomial name
- Arctostaphylos viscida Parry

= Arctostaphylos viscida =

Species of tree

Arctostaphylos viscida, with the common names whiteleaf manzanita and sticky manzanita, is a species of manzanita.

== Distribution ==
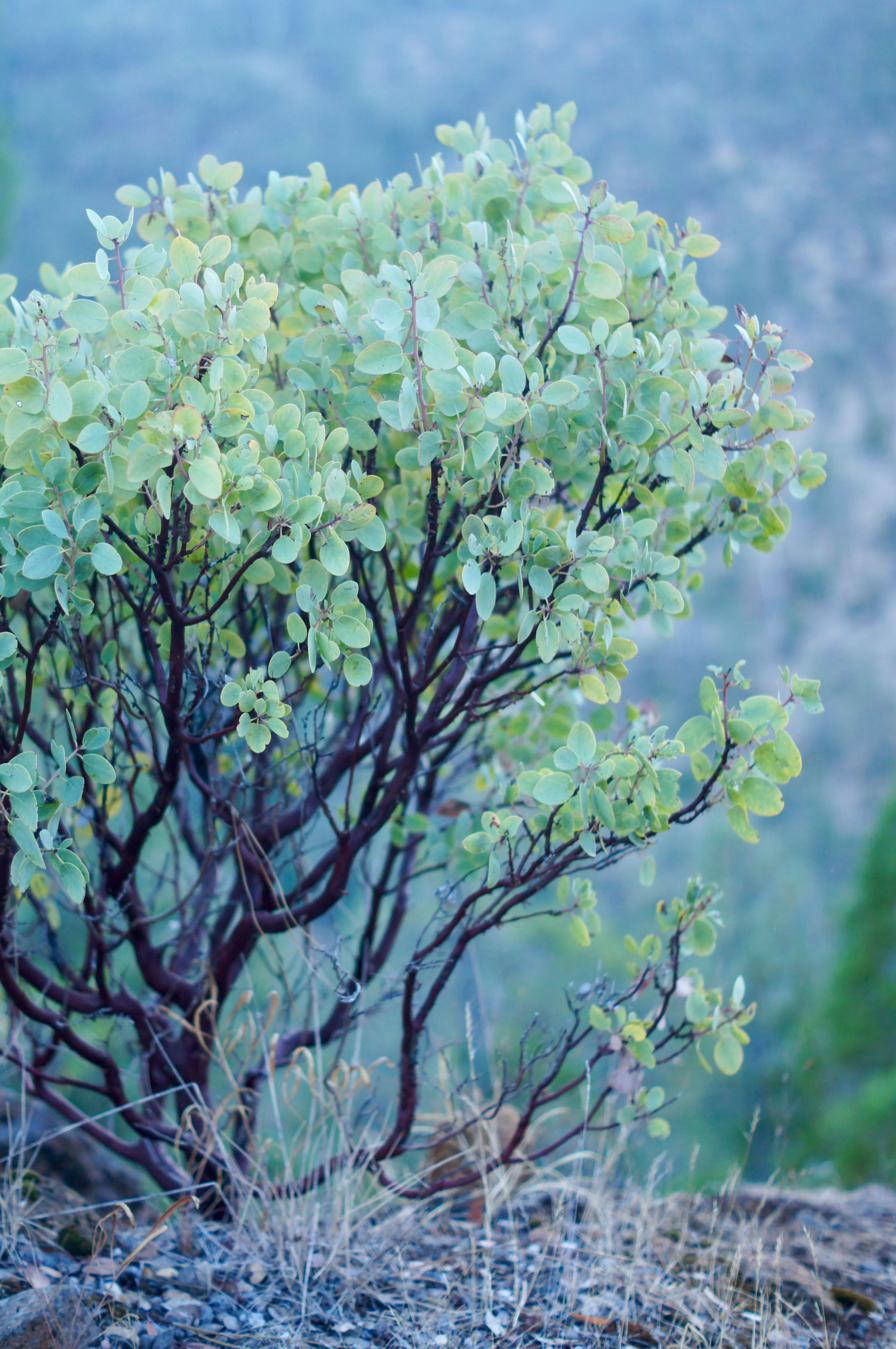
Arctostaphylos viscida in the Rogue River-Siskiyou National Forest, Oregon

Arctostaphylos viscida is a plant of chaparral and coniferous forests of some elevation. It is native to California and Oregon. Sticky whiteleaf manzanita is highly drought-resistant and tolerates mafic soils. In Northern California it is an indicator species for serpentine soil although it is not restricted to this soil type.

== Description ==
It is a treelike shrub reaching up to 5 meters (16 ft). The stems may be smooth or fuzzy, and are often glandular. The leaves are rounded to oval, sometimes slightly toothed or with hairs along the edges, and usually dull green on both surfaces.

When in flower the shrub is packed heavily with densely bunching inflorescences of urn-shaped white to pale pink flowers. The fruits are shiny red or greenish-brown drupes between one half and one centimeter wide. Seeds require fire for germination.

== Uses ==
The Miwok of northern California used the fruit to make cider.
