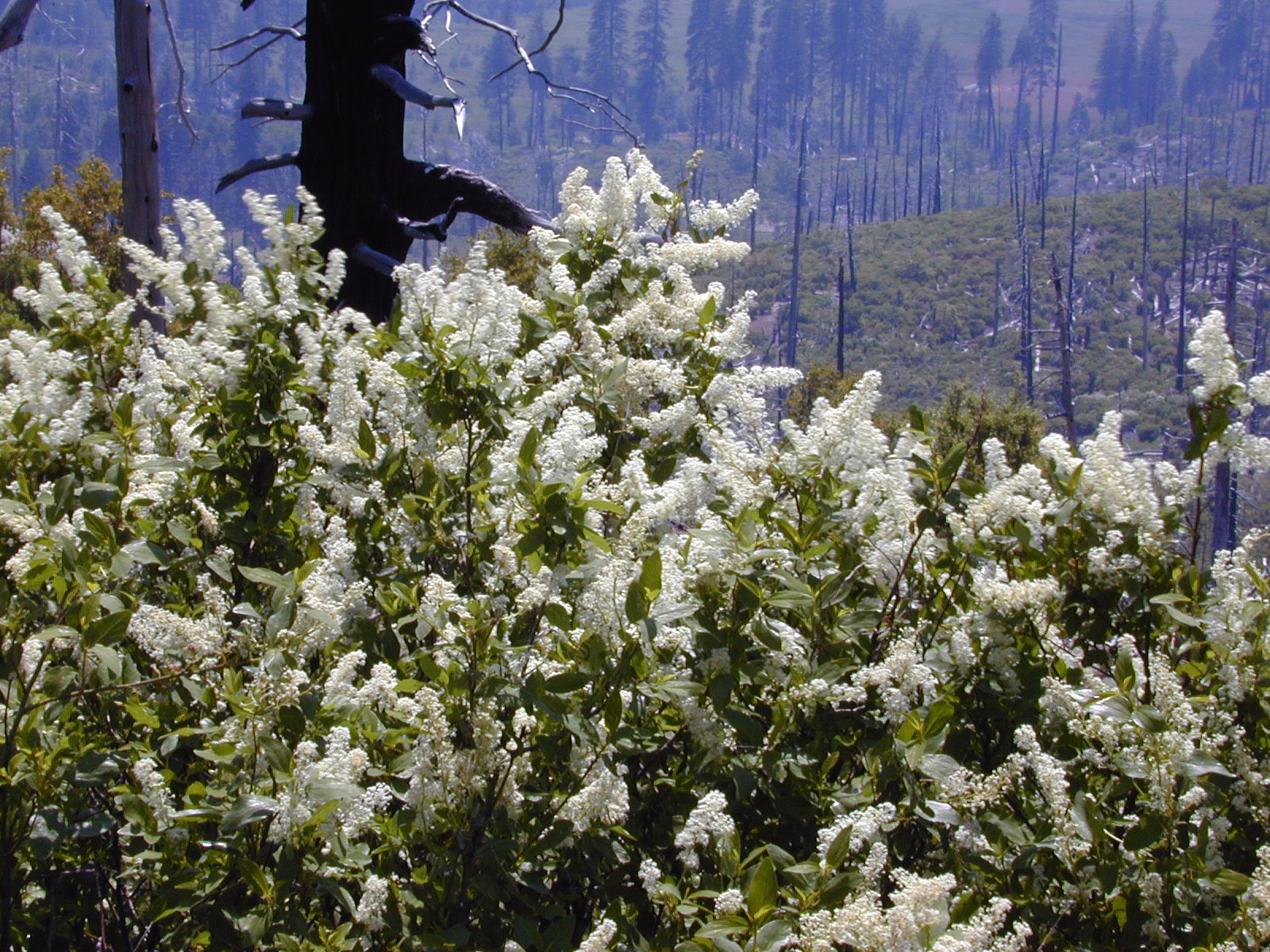

Scientific classification
- Kingdom: Plantae
- Clade: Embryophytes
- Clade: Tracheophytes
- Clade: Angiosperms
- Clade: Eudicots
- Clade: Rosids
- Order: Rosales
- Family: Rhamnaceae
- Genus: Ceanothus
- Species: C. integerrimus

Binomial name
- Ceanothus integerrimus Hook. & Arn.

Synonyms
- Ceanothus andersonii Parry; Ceanothus californicus Keller ex K.Brandegee; Ceanothus californicus Kellogg; Ceanothus macrothyrsus (Torr.) Greene; Ceanothus mogollonicus Greene; Ceanothus myrianthus Greene; Ceanothus nevadensis Kellogg; Ceanothus peduncularis Greene; Ceanothus puberulus Greene

= Ceanothus integerrimus =

Species of flowering plant

Ceanothus integerrimus, known by the common name deer brush, is a species of woody shrub in the family Rhamnaceae, native to the western United States in Arizona, New Mexico, California, Oregon, and Washington. It grows in montane chaparral and woodlands regions, in hardwood forests, and in fir, spruce, and Ponderosa pine plant communities, being most abundant in the California chaparral and woodlands and Sierra Nevada.

== Description ==
Ceanothus integerrimus is a deciduous shrub from 1–4 metres (3.3–13.1 ft) tall with an open ascending to erect branch habit. It is a drought-tolerant phanerophyte. Nitrogen-fixing actinomycete bacteria form root nodules on Ceanothus roots. Its stems are round yellow to pale green in color with either small soft to straight stiff sharp hairs parallel to or in contact with the surface of the stem,.

The leaves are glossy, deciduous and 2.5–8 cm long. Leaves grow alternately on stems. The leaf petioles are less than 15 mm in length and the stipules are also deciduous. The leaf blade is lanceolate, elliptical or oblong to widely ovate in shape. Leaves can have one to two ribs from the base; they are also generally thin and have an acute to obtuse tip. Leaf margins are either entire or slightly dentate, more so towards the leaf tip. Leaf surfaces are light green and are ciliate or contain hairs visible only by magnification. The lower leaves are also hairy and lighter in color.

The flowers are white or blue and rarely pink in color. They are produced in raceme clusters of 15 centimeters or less and contain both male and female organs. The fruit is a sticky valved capsule about 4–5 mm in diameter with a slight crest; the seed is ejected from the capsule after splitting.

It regenerates by seed, shoot formation from the crown and stem, and also by layering when branches come in contact with soil. It has been suggested that some Ceanothus species do not resprout from the root after the crown has burned as a result of fire where most other species are able to regenerate. Pollination of flowers is primarily by bees.

Seed production occurs after about four years of age. High densities of seeds occur in the upper soil of Ceanothus communities. Seeds remain viable up to 24 years or more. Seed dormancy is broken by the removal of the seed coat by fire scarification or physical disturbance. Seeds germinate best at about 1 inch soil depth in shady areas in the spring following fire scarification.

=== Varieties ===
There are four weakly defined varieties of Ceanothus integerrimus. Identification is primarily by leaf morphology and flower color:

- Ceanothus integerrimus var. californicus. Leaves elliptic, lanceolate or oblong to ovate in shape and are three ribbed, from the leaf base. Leaf surfaces have small hairs and the undersides are less hairy than the surface. Flowers generally white or blue.
- Ceanothus integerrimus var. integerrimus.
- Ceanothus integerrimus var. macrothyrsus. Leaf blades oblong or ovate. Leaf blades are three ribbed at the base. Leaf surfaces are pubescent on both the surface and undersides. Flowers are white.
- Ceanothus integerrimus var. puberulus. Leaf blades elliptical or lanceolate and oblong to obovate in shape. Leaf blade is three ribbed from the leaf base. Leaves are also pubescent on both sides. Flowers white.

Ceanothus integerrimus hybridizes with Ceanothus tomentosus (Lemmon's ceanothus) and Ceanothus cordulatus (mountain whitethorn).

== Ecology ==
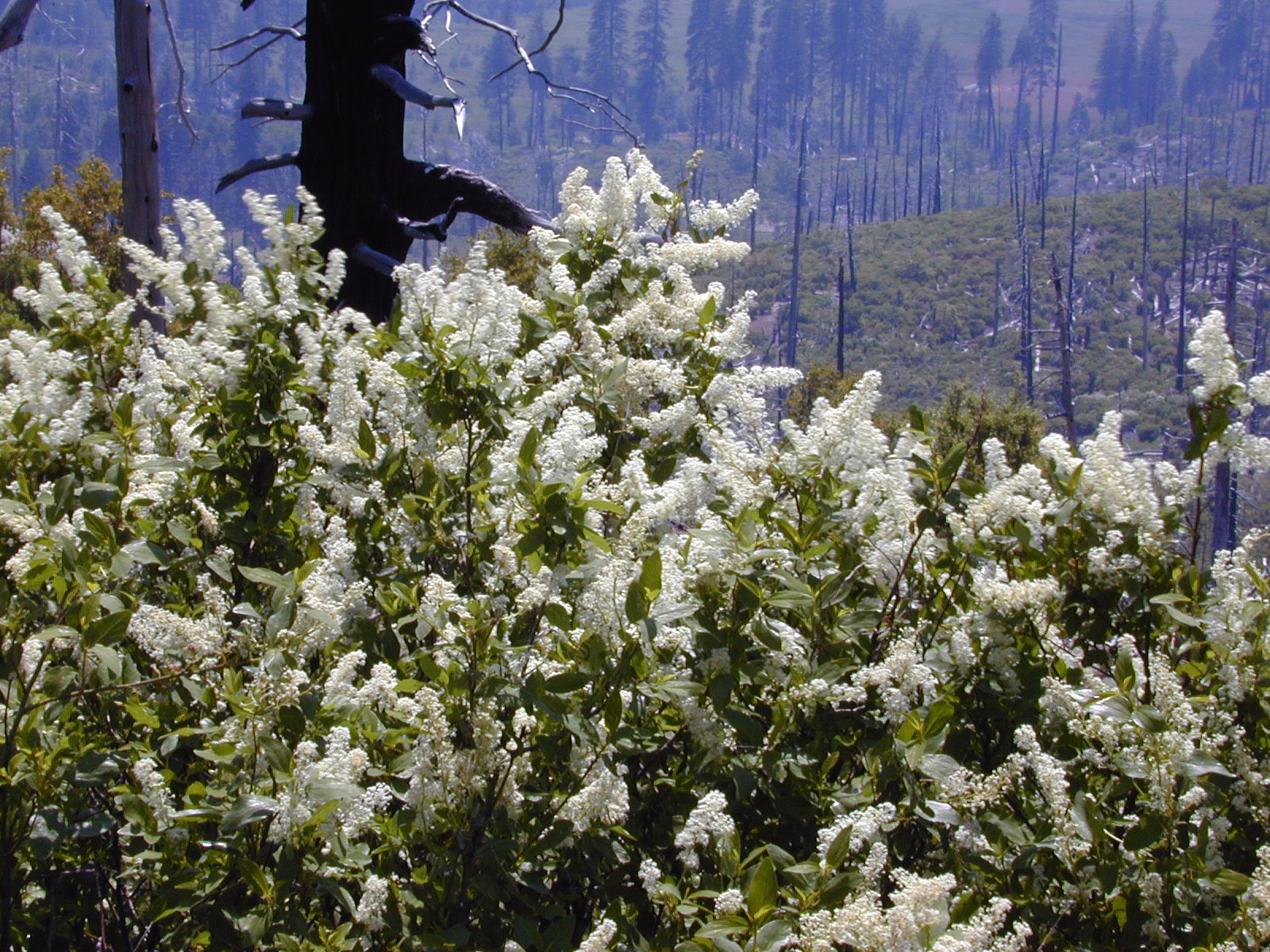
Flowering Ceanothus integerrimus, in Yosemite National Park

C. integerrimus is an important part of forest regeneration after wildfires by providing nitrogen. It does this by creating nitrogen rich patches in the soil. The nitrogen source is created by its root association with nitrogen fixing bacteria.

Deer and specifically mule deer feed on C. integerrimus. Porcupines and quail have also been observed eating the stems and seeds. Nutritionally leaves are a good source of protein and stems and leaves also contain high levels of calcium. However, nutritional quality of leaves is seasonal and appears to be best from fall to early spring.

== Uses ==
Indigenous peoples of California use the branches to treat women after childbirth. The Miwok Indians of Northern California also use the branches of this plant in weaving complex baskets. The Concow tribe call the tree hē′-bē (Konkow language).

Cattle ranchers will claim that cattle do immensely well on this plant during their seasonal grazing.
