= Grizzly Peak (Oregon) =

Mountain in Oregon, United States

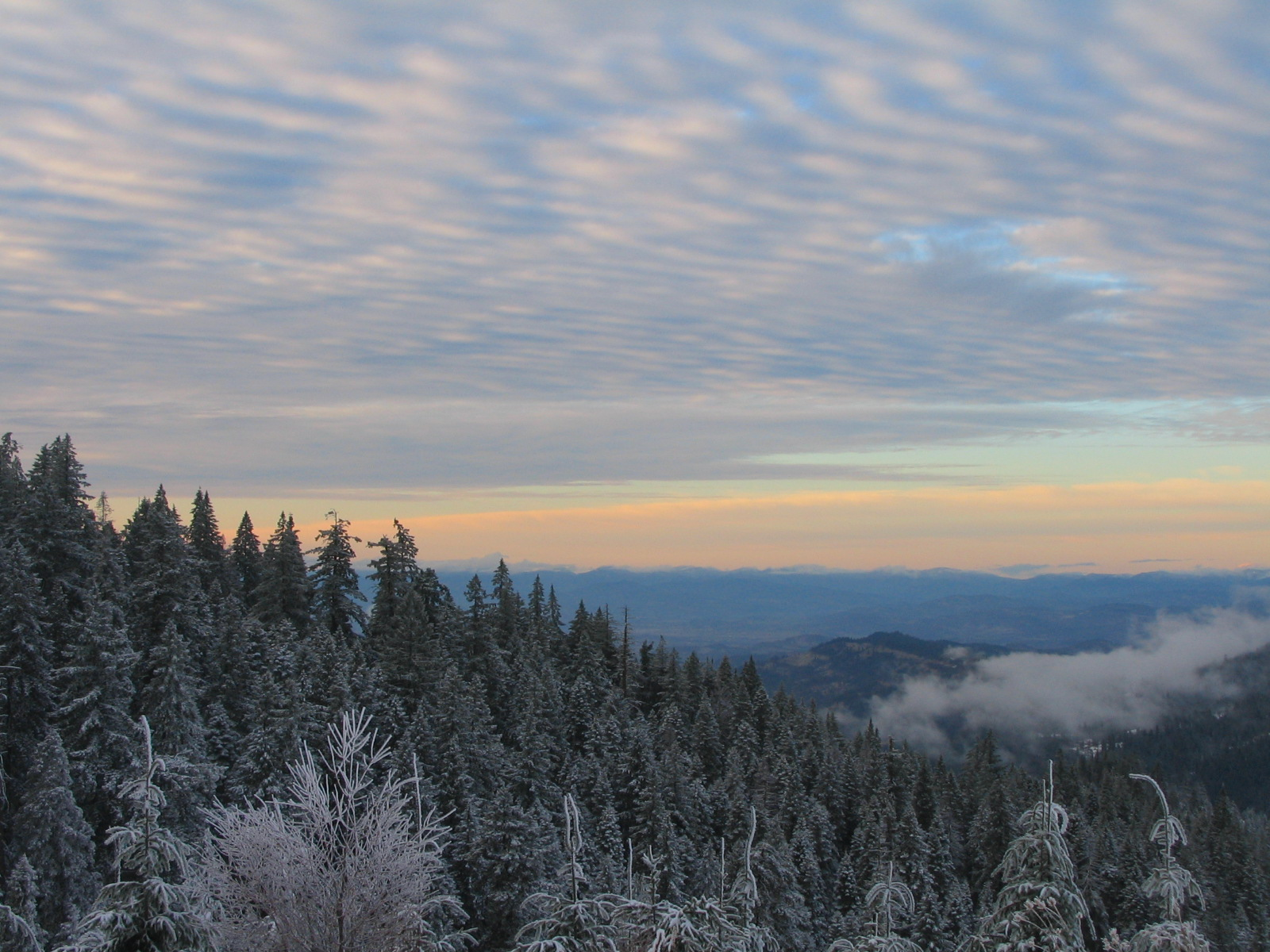
- View from Grizzly Peak

Highest point
- Elevation: 5,922 ft (1,805 m) NGVD 29
- Coordinates: 42°16′11″N 122°36′59″W

Geography
- Location within Oregon
- Location: Jackson County, Oregon, U.S.
- Topo map: USGS Grizzly Peak

Climbing
- Easiest route: Trail hike (class 1)

Grizzly Peak is a mountain in Jackson County, Oregon, overlooking the city of Ashland and the Bear Creek Valley. It has an elevation of 5,922 feet, and is located largely on Bureau of Land Management land. A trail exists to the summit.
