= Antelope Creek =

Antelope Creek may refer to:

== Arizona ==
- Antelope Creek (Coconino County); see Antelope Canyon

== California ==
- Antelope Creek (Placer County)
- Antelope Creek (Plumas County, California) (Plumas County)
- Antelope Creek (Tehama County)

== Oregon ==
- Antelope Creek (Little Butte Creek)

== South Dakota ==
- Antelope Creek (Butte County, South Dakota)
- Antelope Creek (Day County, South Dakota)
- Antelope Creek (Harding County, South Dakota)
- Antelope Creek (Missouri River), a stream in South Dakota
- Antelope Creek (Todd County, South Dakota)

== Wyoming ==
- Antelope Creek (Converse County, Wyoming), tributary to Cheyenne River

== See also ==
- Antelope Creek Bridge
- Antelope Creek Phase
