= James Gilbert Percy =

- Born: July 26, 1921; Ventura County, California, US
- Died: September 16, 2015 (aged 94)
- Buried: Eagle Point National Cemetery; Eagle Point, Oregon
- Allegiance: United States
- Branch: United States Marine Corps
- Service years: 1941–1961
- Rank: Lieutenant Colonel
- Conflicts: World War II: Guadalcanal campaign; Korean War
- Awards: Navy Cross; Distinguished Flying Cross (5); Bronze Star w/ Combat "V"; Air Medal (18); Purple Heart

James Gilbert Percy (July 26, 1921 – September 16, 2015) was a United States Marine Corps officer. He was a flying ace credited with shooting down six Japanese aircraft and was awarded the Navy Cross during World War II.

== Early life ==
James G. Percy was born on July 26, 1921, in Ventura County, California. He was raised in Northern California, and began attending New Mexico Military Institute in 1937. Percy graduated from the high school division in 1939 and the junior college division in 1941. In August 1941, Percy was commissioned as a second lieutenant in the Marine Corps and was designated as a Naval aviator.

== World War II ==
=== Cactus Air Force ace ===
During World War II, First Lieutenant Percy was assigned to Marine Fighting Squadron 112 (VMF-112). VMF-112 arrived at Henderson Field in Guadalcanal on November 2, 1942, making up part of the Cactus Air Force.

Lieutenant Percy began to engage in combat missions in F4F Wildcats on November 14, when he participated in overwatch for friendly dive bombers attacking enemy tank forces. He spotted six enemy A6M Zeros approaching the and alerted his flight leader. Percy helped break up the enemy attack, claiming his first kill.

On February 1, 1943, five enemy dive bombers and 30 fighters attacked American ships near Savo Island, sinking the USS De Haven. Lieutenant Percy led four planes into a group of 10 enemy fighter planes, personally shooting down four. A total of 21 of the enemy aircraft were shot down. Percy was awarded the Navy Cross for his actions during the Guadalcanal campaign.

=== Shot-down ===
On June 7, 1943, Lieutenant Percy and his squadron engaged more than 100 Japanese aircraft over the Russell Islands. Percy was flying the new F4U Corsair and shot down one Zero, his sixth and final kill of the war, and damaged another one. Shortly after making his sixth kill, Percy was wounded by enemy fire and the starboard wing of his aircraft was shot off.

Percy managed to bail out of his plane at a speed of 350 knots. Percy's parachute failed to deploy properly, trailing above him as he fell about 2,000 feet into the ocean. He hit the water feet first, spraining both of his ankles and breaking his pelvis. After miraculously surviving the fall, Percy swam for three hours to the nearest shore. Percy would spend the next year in the hospital before returning to duty.

== Later career and life ==
In the years after World War II, Percy became an experienced Marine helicopter pilot in the early 1950s. Major Percy deployed to Korea, where he served as the operations officer for a Marine helicopter transport squadron from December 1952 to June 1953. In 1955, while serving as the commanding officer of Marine Experimental Helicopter Squadron 1 (HMX-1), Lieutenant Colonel Percy was named the first Presidential helicopter pilot.

Percy retired from the Marines in 1961 with the rank of lieutenant colonel. He died on September 16, 2015, and was buried in Eagle Point National Cemetery in Eagle Point, Oregon.
