= Dead Indian Creek (Oregon) =

Tributary of South Fork Little Butte Creek in Jackson County, Oregon, USA

Latgawa Creek
- Location of the mouth of Latgawa Creek in Oregon

Location
- Country: United States
- State: Oregon
- County: Jackson

Physical characteristics
- Source: Cascade Range
  - location: east of Ashland
  - coordinates: 42°13′17″N 122°29′08″W
  - elevation: 5,684 ft (1,732 m)
- Mouth: South Fork of Little Butte Creek
  - location: east of Medford
  - coordinates: 42°20′18″N 122°27′10″W
  - elevation: 2,562 ft (781 m)
- Basin size: 22.4 sq mi (58 km^{2})

Latgawa Creek (formerly Dead Indian Creek) is a tributary of South Fork Little Butte Creek in Jackson County, in the U.S. state of Oregon. It flows generally north through the Rogue River – Siskiyou National Forest in the Cascade Range east of Medford. The creek begins at 2,562 feet (781 m) above sea level near Howard Prairie Lake and enters the South Fork at Camp Latgawa. The South Fork flows northwest to meet the North Fork near Lake Creek; combined they form Little Butte Creek, a tributary of the Rogue River.

Latgawa Creek was changed from its former name 2020 when Dr. Alice Knotts of American Religious History approached the Jackson County Board of Commissioners to change the name. Latgawa are a Native American people that were displaced from the area during the Rogue River Wars of the 1850s, and moved to the coast on the Siletz Reservation and Grand Rhonde Reservation. Latgawa also means "upland water source."

A nearby place, Latgawa Mountain, underwent a similar name change. However, because Jackson County Board of Commissioners does not have jurisdiction over roads, the name of Dead Indian Memorial Road was not changed. According to Oregon Geographic Names, the original namesake of these places and road were when named after an incident in which two settlers found two dead Tututni in deserted dwellings near the creek. The road, originally named "Dead Indian Road" but renamed to avoid being interpreted as denigrating, eventually extended from Ashland, past the mountain and the creek to Upper Klamath Lake.

== See also ==
- Dead Indian Soda Springs
