= Brownsboro =

Brownsboro can refer to:

- Brownsboro, Alabama
- Brownsboro, Kentucky
- Brownsboro, Oregon
- Brownsboro, Texas, city in Henderson County, Texas
- Brownsboro, Caldwell County, Texas, unincorporated community
- Brownsboro Farm, Kentucky
- Brownsboro Village, Kentucky
