= Eagle Point National Cemetery =

Veterans cemetery in Jackson County, Oregon

- United States
- Used for those deceased
- Established: 1952
- Location: 42°27′50″N 122°47′13″W near Eagle Point, Oregon
- Total burials: >25,000
- Eagle Point National Cemetery
- U.S. National Register of Historic Places
- U.S. Historic district
- Location: 2763 Riley Road; Eagle Point, Oregon
- NRHP reference No.: 16000626
- Added to NRHP: September 13, 2016

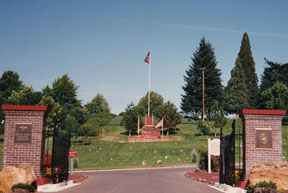
Entrance gate at Eagle Point National Cemetery

Eagle Point National Cemetery is a United States National Cemetery located just east of Eagle Point, Jackson County, Oregon and about 14 miles (20 km) northeast of Medford. Administered by the United States Department of Veterans Affairs, it encompasses 43.4 acres (17.6 ha), and as of 2021, had over 25,000 interments.

== History ==
Cypress Hills National Cemetery opened in 1952 to service the nearby veterans facility in White City, Oregon about four miles away. Administration was transferred to the National Cemetery system in 1973, when it was named White City National Cemetery. The name was changed to Eagle Point National Cemetery on March 19, 1985.

== Noteworthy monuments ==
- A memorial dedicated to "All Unknown Veterans" was erected at the cemetery in 1980, it was donated by the Disabled American Veterans organization.
- A carillon was donated by the American Veterans as part of their international living-memorial program, which began shortly after World War II.
- A memorial dedicated to all 1st Marine Divisions of all Wars was donated by the 1st Marine Division Association.

== Notable interments ==
- USN Lieutenant George Ray Tweed (1902–1989) – World War II veteran who hid for two and a half years following the Battle of Guam, evading capture and supplying information to the US forces in the Pacific. He wrote Robinson Crusoe, USN which inspired the movie No Man Is an Island.
- Charlene Pryer (1921–1999) – World War II veteran and All-American Girls Professional Baseball League player

== See also ==
- National Register of Historic Places listings in Jackson County, Oregon
