= Dead Indian Soda Springs =

Small mineral springs near Eagle Point, Oregon, USA

Coordinates: 42.3322°N 122.4478°W

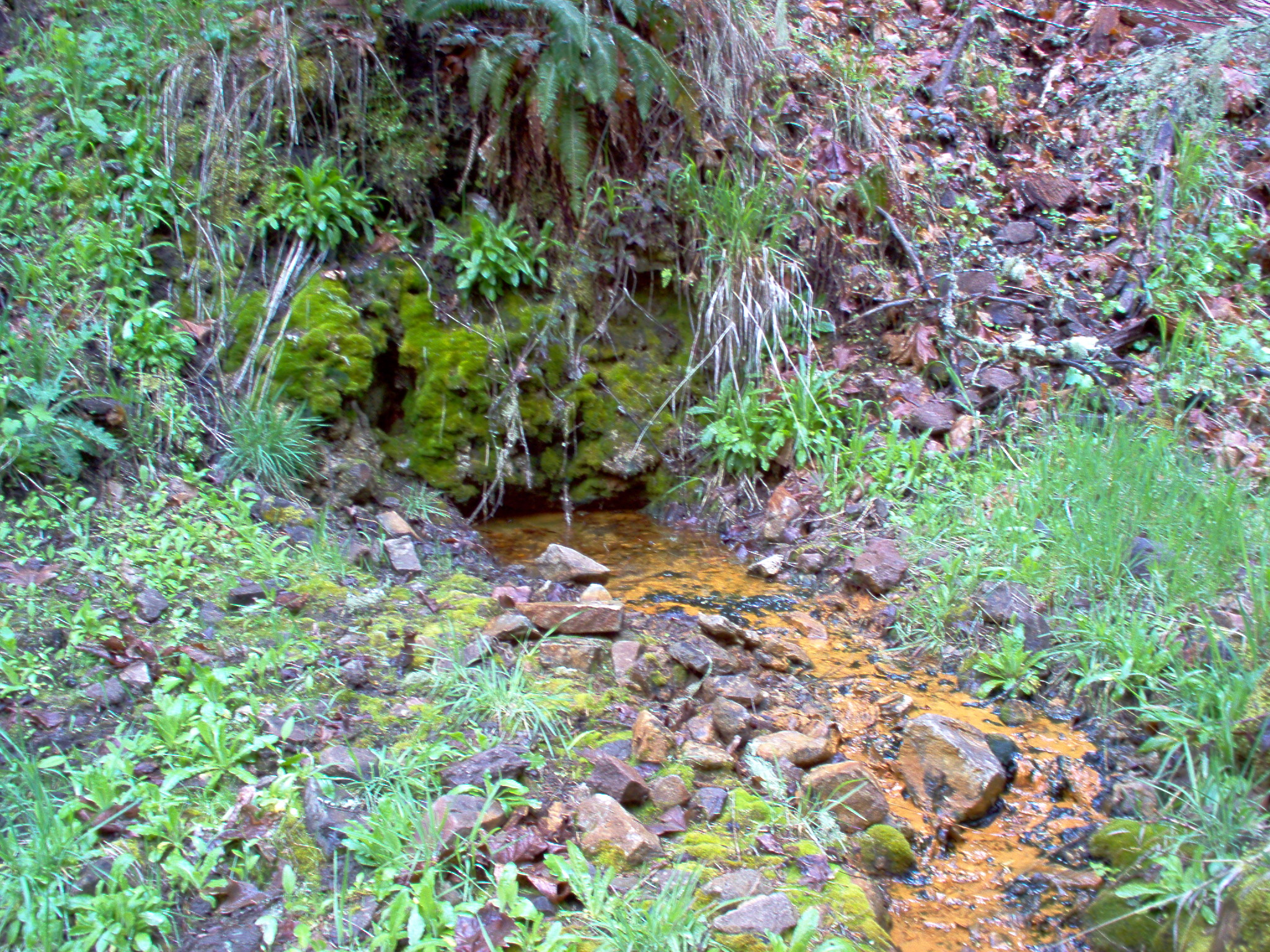
Iron-rich water from the springs

The Dead Indian Soda Springs are an assortment of small mineral springs that feed into Dead Indian Creek near Eagle Point, Oregon, United States. The springs are rich in sodium carbonate, iron, magnesium, and sodium hydroxide.

The springs are located approximately 35 miles (56 kilometers) east of Medford.

== History ==
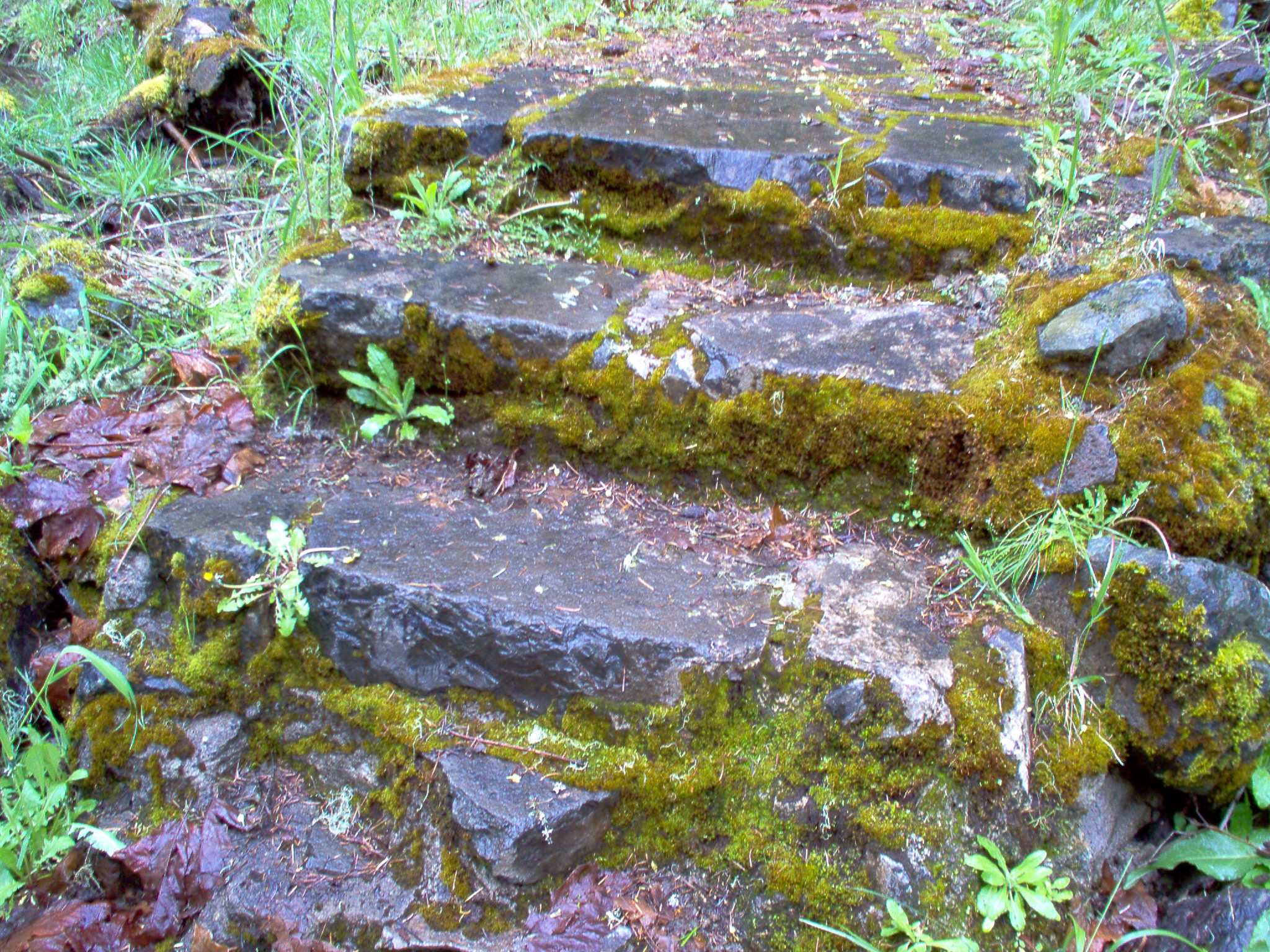
Stone steps at the site

The Dead Indian Soda Springs were discovered by European settlers around 1871, when a man named John Tyrell stopped for a drink while chasing an elk. Within 20 years, the site became a popular camping site for Rogue Valley residents. Shortly after 1900, Charles Wiltkinson built a home and several rental cabins near the mouth of the creek, which are now part of Camp Latgawa.

Men hired during the Great Depression to work in the woods for the Civilian Conservation Corps built a fountain and rockwork path around one of the springs in 1935–1936, but they were gradually washed away during floods in 1955, 1964, and 1997. All that remains today are the trace ruins scattered about the site and a few stone steps that lead from the trail down into the creek.

It is not known whether the springs were used by the Takelma Indians for medicinal purposes, but in the 1920s, Lou Bean bottled some of the springs and sold the water to Brown's Tavern, in Medford.

== Shelter ==
- Dead Indian Soda Springs Shelter
- U.S. National Register of Historic Places
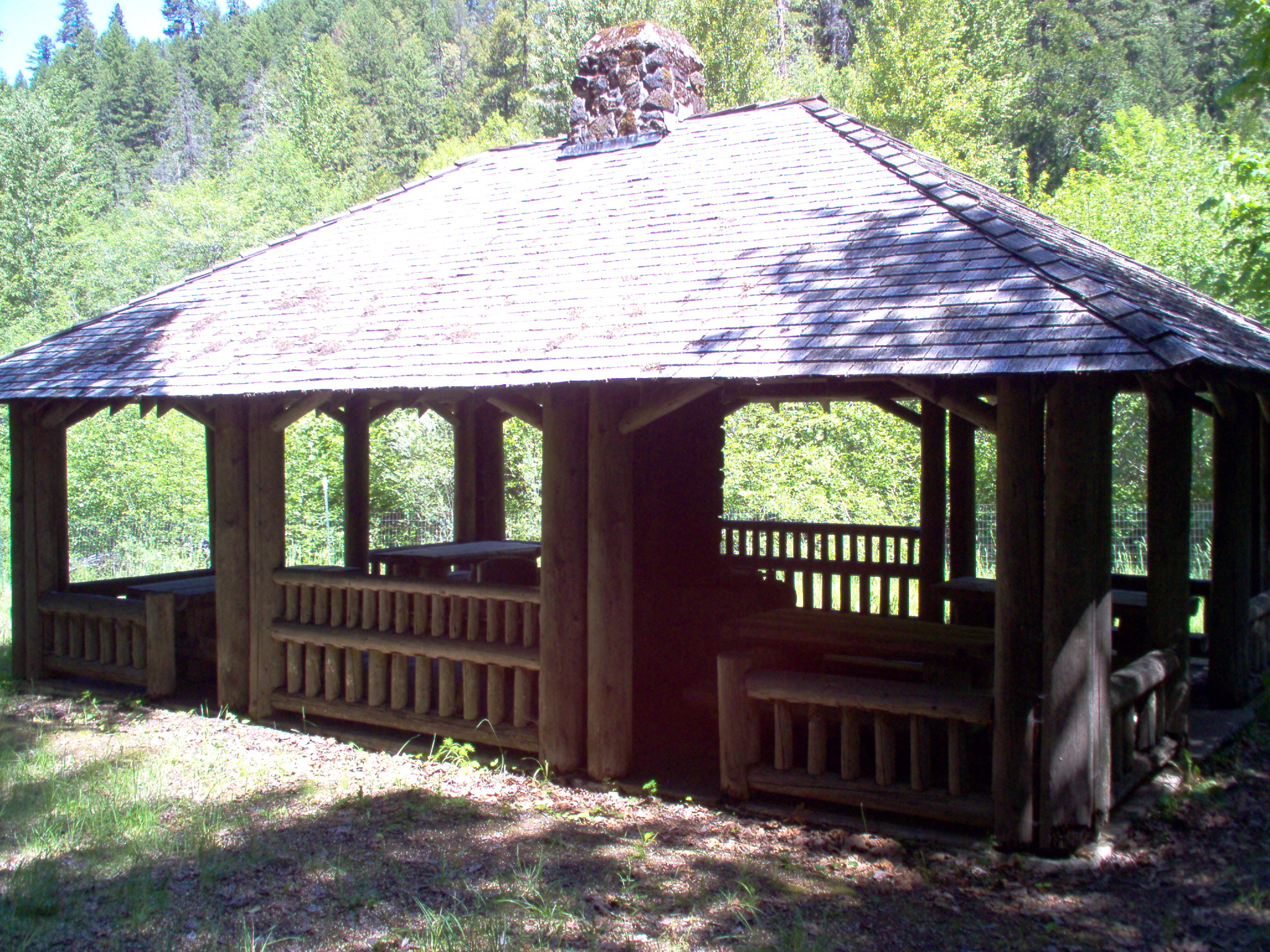
- Location: Eagle Point, Oregon vicinity
- Built: 1936
- Architectural style: Rustic
- MPS: US Forest Service Historic Structures on the Rogue River National Forest
- NRHP reference No.: 00000462
- Added to NRHP: December 29, 2000

On December 29, 2000, the Dead Indian Soda Springs Shelter was added to the National Register of Historic Places. The small shelter, located next to Little Butte Creek, contains four ovens, four picnic tables, and an old wash basin.

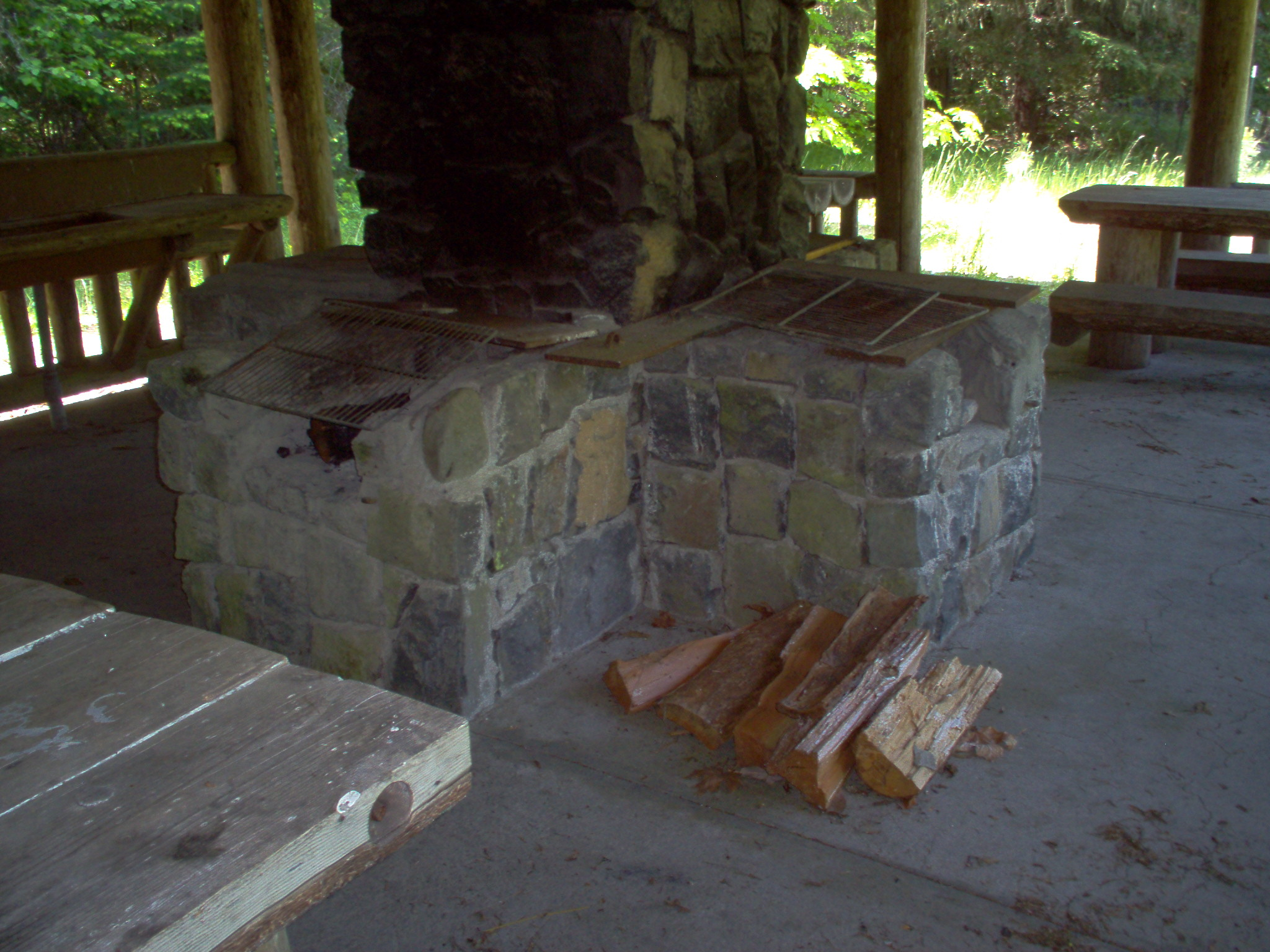
Four cooking ovens, some with grills.

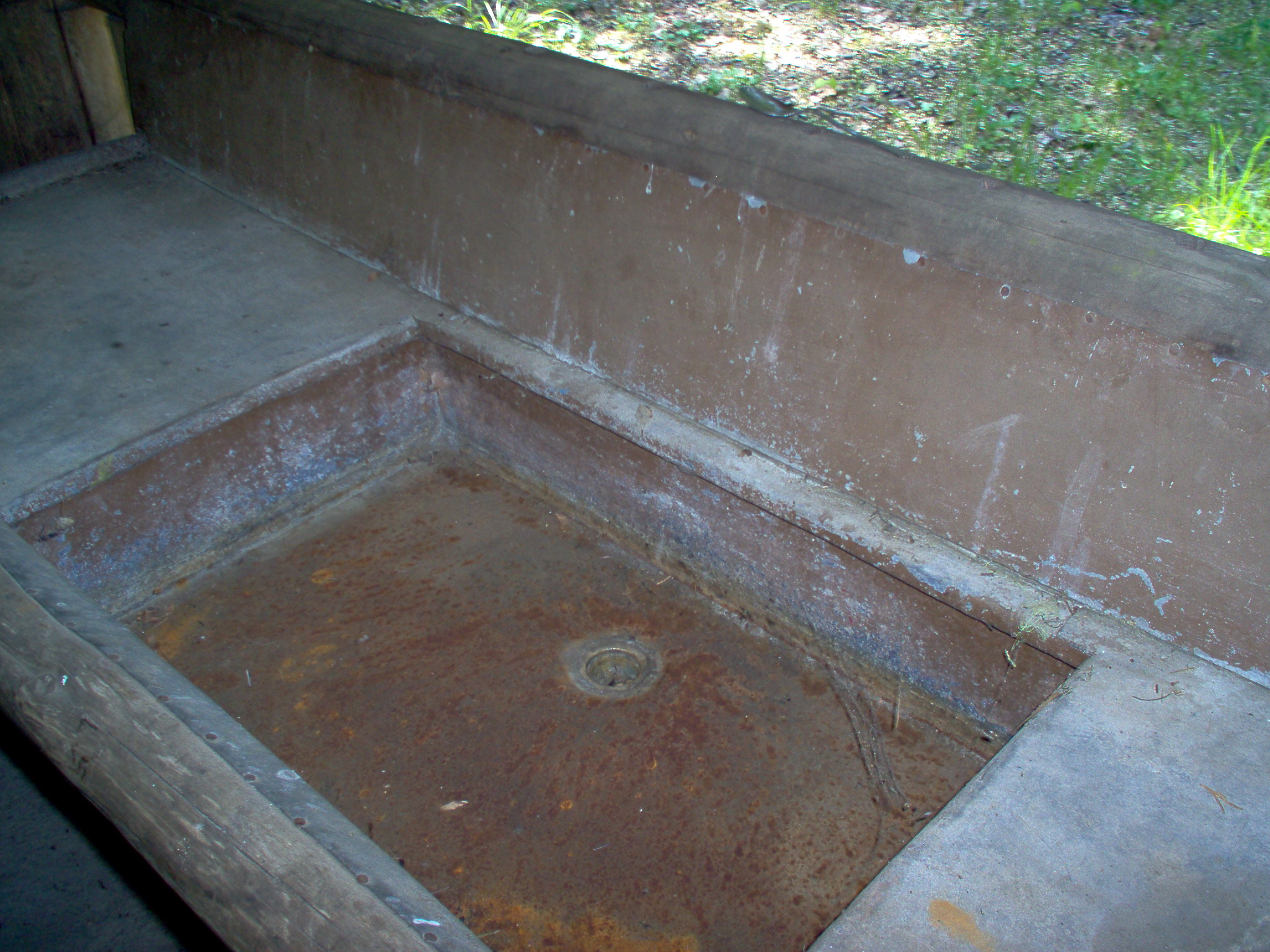
An old wash-basin.
