= Lyonsville =

Lyonsville may refer to:

- Lyonsville, California, an unincorporated community
- Lyonsville, Indiana, an unincorporated community
