= Antelope Creek (Little Butte Creek tributary) =

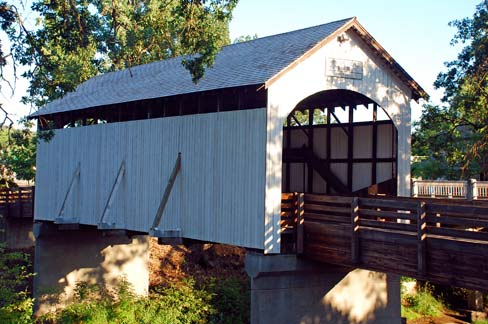
- Antelope Creek Bridge in 2008, after its move to Eagle Point

- Location of the mouth of Antelope Creek in Oregon

Location
- Country: United States
- State: Oregon
- County: Jackson

Physical characteristics
- Source: Cascade Range foothills
  - location: southeast of Medford
  - coordinates: 42°18′00″N 122°35′32″W
  - elevation: 4,643 ft (1,415 m)
- Mouth: Little Butte Creek
  - location: downstream of Eagle Point
  - coordinates: 42°27′32″N 122°50′02″W
  - elevation: 1,257 ft (383 m)

Antelope Creek is a tributary of Little Butte Creek in the U.S. state of Oregon. It begins in the foothills of the Cascade Range southeast of Medford and flows generally northwest to meet the larger creek downstream of Eagle Point and about 3 miles (5 km) by water from Little Butte Creek's mouth on the Rogue River.

The creek passes under Oregon Route 62 (Crater Lake Highway) between Eagle Point and White City, slightly before entering Little Butte Creek. Named tributaries of Antelope Creek from source to mouth are Yankee Creek, Quarter Branch, and Dry Creek.

== Covered bridge ==
Antelope Creek Bridge, a covered bridge, formerly carried "the old Medford – Crater Lake Road" south of Eagle Point. In 1987, the bridge, having been replaced by a modern structure, was moved to an Eagle Point park. Used as a pedestrian bridge, it spans Little Butte Creek instead of Antelope Creek.

== See also ==
- List of rivers of Oregon
