= George Ray Tweed =

U.S. Navy radioman

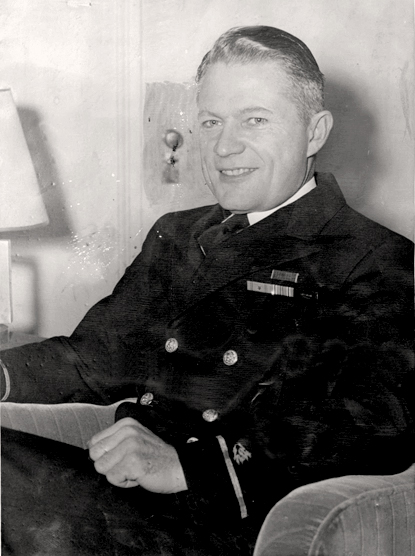
- Born: July 2, 1902; Oregon, United States
- Died: January 16, 1989 (aged 86); Crescent City, California, United States
- Burial place: Eagle Point National Cemetery
- Military career
- Allegiance: United States of America
- Branch: United States Navy
- Service years: 1922–1948
- Rank: Lieutenant
- Conflicts: World War II: First Battle of Guam
- Awards: Silver Star; Legion of Merit with "V" Device

George Ray Tweed (July 2, 1902 – January 16, 1989) was a decorated radioman in the United States Navy who served during World War II. He is most famous for evading Japanese capture for two years and seven months after the surrender of the U.S. garrison on Guam in 1941.

== Early life ==
Tweed enlisted in the United States Navy in 1922 and attended the basic training at Naval Station Great Lakes. He also attended the Radioman School and served in Navy radio units until 1940, when he was transferred to the Naval Base Guam.

At the time a 16-year veteran of the Navy with the rank of Radioman First Class, Tweed was serving in the Navy Communication Office when the Japanese invaded the island on December 8, 1941, in the First Battle of Guam. Tweed had arrived on Guam in August 1939; his family, along with other American women and children, were evacuated in October 1941. The Americans faced the Japanese invasion with 155 Marines, a 200-man native insular force, and 400 Navy personnel who were untrained for combat. He and five other men (Al Tyson, Yeoman First Class Yablonsky, Chief Aerographer Jones, Chief Machinist's Mate Krump, and Machinist's Mate First Class Johnston of the USS Penguin) slipped into the Guam jungle rather than become prisoners of war.

== In hiding ==
When the Japanese became aware of these men on the island, they began to hunt for them. The Americans captured during the initial invasion were taken to Japan, and those captured in the jungle were to be executed. The Japanese offered 100 yen for the capture of any American but 1000 yen for Tweed because of his radio expertise. He was able to get a Silvertone radio working by March 1942, allowing him and the locals to receive news broadcast by KGEI, San Francisco. When that battery ceased operating, he used a Zenith Electronics radio to pick up also the USAFFE, The Voice of Freedom, broadcasts from Corregidor Island. Based on the radio broadcasts, Tweed published an underground newspaper, the Guam Eagle, for four months using a typewriter and carbon paper.

None of the men wanted to surrender, and the Japanese eventually captured and executed all of them except Tweed. Krump, Jones and Yablonsky were surrounded after Felix Jota, a native, disclosed their hiding place for the rewards, and they were beheaded on September 12. Tyson and Johnston were shot when they were surrounded by 50 Japanese sailors on October 22 after Juan and Frank Perez disclosed their hiding place. The Japanese also tortured and executed local Chamorro natives whom they suspected of helping the missing Americans. The locals did not want Tweed to surrender: "The people of Guam feel that as long as you hold out the Americans will come back."

Tweed managed to hide in the middle portion of the island, aided by many locals in 11 different locations, until October 1942. Then, Tweed was sheltered on Antonio Artero's ranch on the northwest portion of the island. In total, Tweed managed to elude the Japanese for two years and seven months, until just before the start of the Second Battle of Guam in 1944. During that time, he studied algebra and made shoes for the family watching over him.

On July 10, 1944, he was able to signal two destroyers involved in preparations for the impending US invasion, with a mirror and semaphore. Tweed conveyed information about Japanese defenses that he had gathered from his vantage point overlooking the west coast of the island. He was rescued by a whaleboat from the USS McCall.

== Later life ==
For his heroism, Tweed was awarded the Legion of Merit with "V" Device and promoted to chief petty officer. He was later promoted to warrant officer. Tweed returned to Guam in September 1946 to thank those still alive who had helped him. He retired as a lieutenant in 1948. He was later also decorated with the Silver Star.

According to a newspaper article (Le Petit Journal, Montreal) from August 25, 1946, Tweed had promised the native rancher, Antonio Artero, a new car if he evaded capture and returned to the United States. Tweed confirmed in a video interview in 1984 for a Guam Cable TV program that with the help of General Motors, in a promotional campaign to highlight the resumption of consumer motor vehicle production, he accompanied a new 1946 four-door Chevrolet automobile sent from San Francisco, California to Antonio Artero. Franklin Artero, the son of Antonio, confirmed that in guided tours he gave in 2010, which included a family scrap book of this return visit by Tweed in 1946.

Tweed died in an automobile accident in 1989 at the age of 86. He is buried at Eagle Point National Cemetery in Oregon.

Tweed's story is told in short in the official US Navy documentary on the Battle, Return to Guam, as well as in his 1945 book Robinson Crusoe, USN. His story was also dramatized in the 1962 movie No Man Is an Island, starring Jeffrey Hunter as Tweed. He appeared on the television show To Tell the Truth on October 22, 1962, where two of the four panelists correctly identified him over the two imposters.

== Decorations ==
George Ray Tweed's ribbon bar:

1st Row	Silver Star		Legion of Merit with "V" Device
2nd Row	Navy Presidential Unit Citation	Navy Good Conduct Medal with silver star	American Defense Service Medal with "Base" clasp
3rd Row	American Campaign Medal	Asiatic-Pacific Campaign Medal with two service stars	World War II Victory Medal
