= Nathan Pine =

American athletic administrator

- Pine, in February 2025

Current position
- Team: Air Force
- Conference: Mountain West

Biographical details
- Born: Eagle Point, Oregon, U.S.
- Education: Oregon State University B.A. University of California, Berkeley M.A.

Administrative career (AD unless noted)
- 2000–2005: Oregon State (Regional Director)
- 2005–2008: Army (Assoc. AD)
- 2008–2011: California (Asst. AD)
- 2011–2014: Maryland (Deputy AD)
- 2014–2019: Holy Cross
- 2019–2026: Air Force

Nathan Pine is an American athletic administrator, previously serving as Director of Athletics at the United States Air Force Academy.

== Biography ==
Pine has an undergraduate degree from Oregon State University in business administration and a master's degree in education from University of California at Berkeley.

Pine began his administrative career at Oregon State University in September 2000, where he was involved in the fundraising efforts such as for renovation of Reser Stadium.

Pine spent four years at the United States Military Academy, from 2005 to 2008, where he managed all business initiatives for Army and oversight of the external and revenue generating operations for athletics.

From 2008 to 2011, Pine was at the University of California at Berkeley, where as associate athletic director he oversaw all aspects of the major gift program and development staff for athletics. Pine led the university’s athletics fundraising capital campaign, an unprecedented $500 million effort.

Pine then was the deputy athletic director at the University of Maryland where Pine directly supervised all of the external support units and revenue generation for the department including development, marketing, media relations, ticket operations and video services.

Pine served as athletic director at the College of the Holy Cross from 2013 to 2019. Pine oversaw impressive growth at Holy Cross during his tenure there to include NCAA post-season appearances in men’s basketball and baseball in addition to record fundraising growth and facility construction.

Pine has served as the athletic director at the United States Air Force Academy since January 2019.
