= Lyonsville, California =

Unincorporated community in California, United States

Coordinates: 40°18′34″N 121°44′17″W

Lyonsville in Tehama County, California, United States was the site of the Lyonsville Mill, a major lumber operation which was once the largest sawmill in Northern California. It was located between the north and south forks of Antelope Creek, high above Hogsback Ridge. The mill served logging operations around Antelope Creek, and around it grew a town of the same name, with two saloons, a community hall, a general store, a post office, and machine and blacksmith shops. At its peak, there were more than 1000 people in the town.

Nothing remains of it today apart from a giant sawdust pile, some brick mill foundations, a cemetery located 0.5 miles (0.80 km) from the town proper, and thousands of square nails, bolts, and railroad spikes.

== History ==
A post office was established at Lyonsville in 1883, which was moved to Paynes Creek in May 1937. The mill, and town, were named after Darwyn B. Lyon, who was the first superintendent of the Antelope Division of the Sierra Lumber Company, which operated several mills in the area when the town was founded.

Champion #1 Mill was built by Herbert Kraft and became one of the C. F. Ellsworth mills in Antelope Creek in 1870.

The Lyonsville Mill, also known as Champion #2 Mill and by locals as "The Champ", was constructed three times, and by 1885 employed 300 to 400 people. It was first built as a steam mill in 1876/1877, having 2 circular saws which could nominally cut 30000 board-feet per day, and operated until it burned down in 1891. It was then re-built, to again burn down in 1907. A narrow-gauge railway with a roundhouse was used to move logs to the mill.

The Diamond Match Company acquired Sierra's timber holdings in 1907, and the mill was rebuilt in 1908 for the third time.

At the turn of the century, mill hands would "ride the flume" on wooden boards for 35 miles between Lyonsville and Red Bluff. The original flume had been built by the people who first settled Lyonsville, to divert water from the Creek to their home, which was on an old Yahi Native American foot trail between Lassen and Antelope Creek, named Waganupa. The mill was served by a newer box flume. Sawdust was dumped from the mill at the foot of Antelope Creek and would eventually become a pile several hundred feet deep.

In 1913, Champion #2 Mill closed because Diamond Match moved their operations to Sterling City. By 1918, residents had abandoned the town. However, a "new" Lyonsville, 1.5 miles (2.4 km) northeast of the original site and near the Turner Ranch, is recorded between 1926 and 1956. It was the location of a Civilian Conservation Corps camp. Although Lyonsville became a ghost town, its post office did not close until December 28, 1937.
