= Denman Wildlife Area =

Wilderness management area in Oregon

- IUCN category V (protected landscape/seascape)
- Location within the United States
- Location: Jackson County, Oregon
- Nearest city: Eagle Point, Oregon
- Coordinates: 42.4484589°N 122.8364295°W
- Area: 1,760 acres (7.1 km^{2})
- Established: 1954
- Visitors: 40,000 (in 2008)
- Governing body: Oregon Department of Fish and Wildlife

The Denman Wildlife Area (originally the Rogue Valley Game Management Area) is a wildlife management area near Eagle Point, Oregon, in the United States. It was named in honor of Kenneth Denman, an attorney from nearby Medford, Oregon, who lobbied for the creation of the area in 1954.

The area is adjacent to TouVelle State Recreation Site and the Upper and Lower Table Rock lava formations.

== History ==
Kenneth George Denman was born in Corvallis, Oregon in 1904. His father, George Washington Denman, was superintendent of Benton County schools and began practicing law soon after the birth of his son. Kenneth's mother, Minnie Hodes, died when he was 17 years old and beginning to practice law himself.

Denman married a French teacher from Salem in 1930 named Margaret Bolt. The two of them moved to Medford for job opportunities. He remained very active in the Rogue Valley for many years until his death in 1962.

After World War II, Denman was offered a position in the Oregon Department of Fish and Wildlife (then called the Game Commission). He took the spot in 1944 and remained there for about a year and a half. Denman was reappointed in 1951 and was elevated to chairman a year later.

The Denman Wildlife Area is situated on land originally owned by the Takelma tribe, and later owned by the United States Government. In 1942, the US Army had established Camp White in what is now known as White City, a census-designated place located in Jackson County, Oregon. The 174 km^{2} (67 mi^{2}, 43,000 acre) training facility had remained in service until the end of World War II, and almost all of it was sold as real estate.

The US Government trusted the remaining land to Department of Fish and Wildlife for use as a wildlife management area in April 1954. By then, only 7.122 km^{2} (2.75 [[mi^{2}]]) of the Camp White land remained.

Kenneth Denman, who had asked legislators in Salem, Oregon to set the area aside as a wildlife preserve, was regarded by Southern Oregon residents to be most responsible for the area. In March 1963, less than a year after his death, the area was renamed in his honor.

== Geography ==
The Denman Wildlife Area consists of two units. One, south of the White City Industrial Park, is centered on the Gregory Ponds and contains the Wildlife Area's office. The other, north of the Industrial Park and the TouVelle State Recreation Site, contains frontage on both sides of the Rogue River and on the Little Butte Creek. Features in this unit also include partially underground World War II-era ammunition storage buildings, ponds and marshes. Recreational facilities include horse trails and a nature loop trail. The gated TouVelle Road provides access to the interior of the refuge on both sides of the river.

== Development ==
In January 1999, the ODFW took action against the problem of littering in the wildlife area by installing locks on one of the gated entrances. Keys were made available at no charge to hunters and fishermen who requested them. A similar move two years earlier saw great success in eliminating much of the illegal dumping that was occurring.

In 2009, a project was approved to construct a $70,000 building for equipment stored at the Denman Area. The building is expected to be completed within a few months of being started and will be approximately 2,880 square feet (268 square meters).

=== Future goals ===
In an October 2006 meeting, the Oregon Department of Fish and Wildlife identified two long-term goals for the Denman Wildlife Area. The first goal involves habitat conservation and calls for provisioning the wildlife area in four overlapping parts; 2.95 km^{2} (1.14 mi^{2}) of wetland habitat, 1.18 km^{2} (0.45 mi^{2}) of upland habitat, 2.91 km^{2} (1.13 mi^{2}) of vernal pool habitat, and 0.49 km^{2} (0.19 mi^{2}) of forage land.

The second goal announced at the October 2006 meeting involves improving the recreational aspect of the area, with discussions touching on improving wheelchair-accessible trails, predator control, blackberry overgrowth, and the ongoing problem of littering.

Another project in the works is a 10-year plan to restore the flow pattern of Little Butte Creek, a tributary of the Rogue River which was straightened into a man-made canal during the 1950s. The straight canal is prohibitive to juvenile coho salmon, which use small streams as a wintering refuge. By restoring a "natural" winding path, the salmon gain not only another such refuge, but new spawning grounds as well. As of 2007, the project has no funding or engineering plans in effect.

== Events ==
The Denman Wildlife Area is a high-use hunting zone, especially for game birds. Since 1992, the Area has hosted the Youth Game-Bird and Waterfowl Hunt. During this annual event, only children and teenagers are allowed to hunt in the area. The ODFW takes reservations and allows up to 90 hunters at a time the chance to catch stocked pheasant. In 2007, five-hundred pheasants were purchased for the event, which lasts for two days.
