= Hyatt Reservoir =

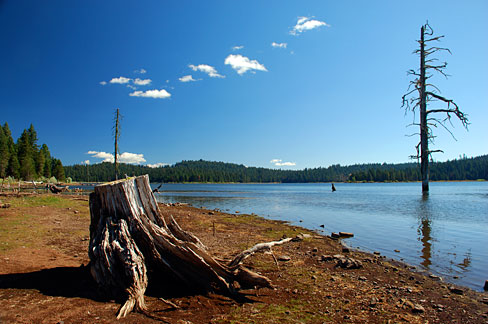
- Hyatt Reservoir

- Location within Oregon Location within the United States
- Location: Jackson County, Oregon
- Coordinates: 42°11′10″N 122°27′14″W
- Type: Reservoir, eutrophic
- Primary inflows: Cottonwood Creek
- Primary outflows: Keene Creek
- Catchment area: 8 square miles (21 km^{2})
- Basin countries: United States
- Surface area: 957 acres (387 ha)
- Average depth: 18 feet (5.5 m)
- Max. depth: 38 feet (12 m)
- Water volume: 16,900 acre-feet (20,800,000 m^{3})
- Shore length^{1}: 7.5 miles (12.1 km)
- Surface elevation: 5,016 ft (1,529 m)
- ^{1} Shore length is not a well-defined measure.

Hyatt Reservoir is a reservoir in Jackson County, Oregon, United States, 14 miles (23 km) east of Ashland. Impounded by Hyatt Dam, the water is used for irrigation and recreation. A local irrigation district built the dam in 1923.

Located at an elevation of 5,016 feet (1,529 m), the lake supports populations of bass, trout, and other species. The Bureau of Land Management oversees a large public recreation complex adjacent to the lake.

== History ==
Little Hyatt reservoir was created by the Hyatt Dam, constructed in 1923 by the local irrigation district to impound Keene Creek. It stands at the southern end of the reservoir, and was rehabilitated in 1960 by the current owner, the United States Bureau of Reclamation. The Talent Irrigation District operates the facility.

Water from Hyatt Reservoir, Little Hyatt Reservoir—further downstream on Keene Creek—and Howard Prairie Lake, a larger reservoir 3 miles (4.8 km) to the east, is carried by the Ashland Lateral Canal to Emigrant Lake, a storage reservoir near Ashland.

During the 2020–21 North American drought, the lake reached 1% capacity.

== Recreation ==
The Bureau of Land Management (BLM) oversees a variety of camping sites at Hyatt Reservoir. The complex can accommodate tent camping for people who arrive by car, horse, or recreational vehicle, or who arrive on foot, some following the Pacific Crest Trail, which passes by the lake. The main campground has flush toilets, hot showers, two boat ramps, a group shelter, a softball field and other amenities. Activities include boating, swimming, fishing, basketball, volleyball, horseshoes, and wildlife watching. The BLM charges fees for use of the sites, which are open from late April through October. In the off-season winter months, the sites may be used without charge, but water and other amenities are not available. Winter activities in the area include cross-country skiing and snowmobiling on marked trails. Private commercial resorts are also located near the lake.

Hyatt Reservoir is stocked each year with about 250,000 young rainbow trout, some of which eventually reach 20 inches (51 cm) in length in the lake's favorable conditions. Sport fishing for largemouth bass is also common, and the lake supports populations of crappie, bluegill, and other fish.

== See also ==
- List of lakes in Oregon
