= Antelope Creek Bridge =

Covered bridge in Oregon, US

- Antelope Creek Covered Bridge
- U.S. National Register of Historic Places
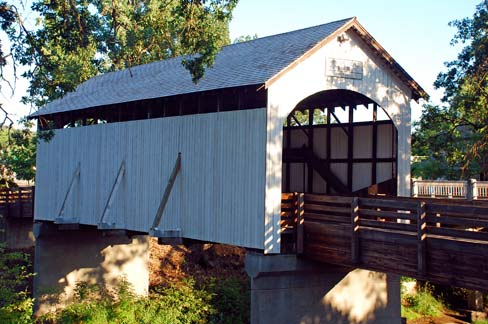
- Antelope Covered Bridge in 2008

- Location within Oregon Location within the United States
- Nearest city: Eagle Point, Oregon
- Coordinates: 42°28′19.1″N 122°48′00.8″W
- Built: 1922 (1987)
- Built by: Lyle and Wes Hartman
- Architectural style: Queen post truss, modified
- MPS: Oregon Covered Bridges TR
- NRHP reference No.: 79002071
- Added to NRHP: 2012 (1979)

The Antelope Creek Bridge is a wooden covered bridge, 58 feet (18 m) long, spanning Little Butte Creek in Eagle Point in the U.S. state of Oregon. Constructed in 1922 by brothers Wes and Lyle Hartman, it originally spanned Antelope Creek, north of Medford. Antelope Creek is a tributary of Little Butte Creek, which it enters about 2 miles (3 km) downstream of Eagle Point. According to Oregon's Covered Bridges, at its original location the bridge carried "the old Medford – Crater Lake Road" over Antelope Creek.

After a newer span replaced the bridge at its original location, it was no longer used by vehicles, and it deteriorated. Even so, it was listed on the National Register of Historic Places (NRHP) in 1979.

In 1987, to save the bridge, volunteers took it down and reassembled it over Little Butte Creek in Eagle Point. Since then it has served as a pedestrian bridge in Covered Bridge Park, adjacent to the veterans' memorial.

In 1988, after its move to Eagle Point, the bridge was temporarily delisted because restoration work had created side windows that were not part of the original. In 2012, after correction of those alterations, the bridge was re-added to the NRHP.

Notable features of the bridge include its queenpost truss modified by addition of a kingpost, its ribbon openings under the eaves, and its cantilevered buttresses. The bridge has a cedar roof, semi-circular portals, and board siding without battens.

== See also ==
- List of bridges on the National Register of Historic Places in Oregon
- List of covered bridges in Oregon
