= Brownsboro, Oregon =

Unincorporated community in the state of Oregon, United States

- Unincorporated community
- Location within Oregon Location within the United States
- Coordinates: 42°28′05″N 122°42′36″W
- Country: United States
- State: Oregon
- County: Jackson
- Elevation: 1,437 ft (438 m)
- Time zone: UTC-8 (Pacific (PST))
  - Summer (DST): UTC-7 (PDT)
- ZIP code: 97524
- Area codes: 458 and 541
- GNIS feature ID: 1118139

Brownsboro is an unincorporated community in Jackson County, Oregon, United States, on Oregon Route 140 about 4 miles (6 km) east of Eagle Point.

The community, along Little Butte Creek, was named in 1853 for Henry R. Brown, who owned the land at this location. A post office called Brownsborough opened here in 1873. John Bilger was the first postmaster. The name of the post office was changed to Brownsboro in 1892, and the office remained open until 1954.
