= No Man Is an Island (film) =

1962 film by John Cherry Monks, Jr.

- Directed by: Richard Goldstone; John Monks Jr.
- Written by: Richard Goldstone; John Monks Jr.
- Produced by: Richard Goldstone; John Monks Jr.
- Starring: Jeffrey Hunter; Marshall Thompson; Barbara Perez
- Color process: Eastmancolor
- Production company: Gold Coast Productions
- Distributed by: Universal-International
- Release date: September 20, 1962
- Running time: 114 minutes
- Country: United States
- Language: English
- Budget: $650,000

No Man Is an Island is a 1962 war film based on a true story about the exploits of George Ray Tweed, a United States Navy radioman who avoided capture and execution by the Japanese during their years-long World War II occupation of Guam. It stars Jeffrey Hunter as Tweed. The film was shot entirely in the Philippines and all the supporting actors spoke Tagalog rather than Chamorro, to the amusement of Chamorros who saw the film.

== Plot ==
It is 1941. Tweed is at a radio outpost on Guam from where he expects to return to mainland America. His replacement, Roy, arrives with Vicente, a local. Shortly after bombing Pearl Harbor, the Japanese attack Guam by air, killing Vicente and Chief Schultz. The five survivors from the outpost run for the hills as Japanese troops garrison the island.

Using medical documents from American prisoners the Japanese realise the five men are missing. The Japanese send patrols to capture the men, starting a long cat-and-mouse sequence. With help from locals the five escape one Japanese patrol but their evasion is short lived. Roy, who has lost a shoe, steps on a scorpion, the toxins weakening him and slowing the escape party. Tweed hides Roy with some brush and gives him a pistol, promising he'll "be back for the gun". Turney decides to surrender with Roy, arguing the Japanese will care for Roy's foot and they will be unharmed as prisoners of war. Turney uses his white shirt to signal the Japanese but is promptly killed. Panicking, Roy kills a Japanese soldier, before being killed himself. Chico, another American radioman, attempts to shoot at the Japanese but Tweed restrains him so they can remain hidden.

The three surviving Americans meet Sus Quitugua on a copra plantation, who promises to take them to his boss Santos, who will know where they can hide. Smuggling the Americans past a Japanese roadblock turns fatal, however, when Chico is killed by a stray shot from a drunken Japanese officer. Quitugua reveals that he has hidden an old radio, which the two Americans repair. When the radio's battery dies, Quitugua and Sonnenberg travel back to their abandoned jeep to retrieve its battery. Meanwhile, Tweed escapes another searching Japanese patrol but not before discovering the bound and beheaded bodies of Sonnenberg and Quitugua.

Tweed, now the sole survivor, makes it to a leprosy hospital, where he is cared for by a priest and his assistant. Tweed is told the Japanese would not dare visit the hospital so he will be safe. The hospital has a functioning radio. Tweed uses a typewriter to relay news he hears on the radio into a makeshift newspaper called the Guam Eagle, which is secretly shared among locals. The plan goes awry when the newspaper, meant to be read and then burned, incites locals to rebel against the Japanese. The Japanese learn of the Guam Eagle and Shimoda, reading one of the newspapers, smells medicine, which leads them to believe Tweed is hiding in the leprosy hospital. When the Japanese search the hospital Tweed hides in the leprosy isolation ward, where Japanese soldiers do not search as they are too horrified by the patients. A fire starts accidentally and, despite efforts to extinguish it, the hospital burns down. The priest, suspected of distributing the newspaper, is taken away for questioning.

Tweed awakes to find the priest's assistant and a man named Antonio Cruz. Cruz fears for his family because the Japanese have warned anyone helping Tweed will be executed, but instead hides Tweed at the top of a large rock face where there is a cave. Antonio promises to bring supplies every now and then. Tweed meets Antonio's beautiful daughter Josephina, or "Joe", who brings supplies in her father's stead. A nearby Japanese patrol is alerted to Tweed's position by an alarm clock that Joe brought with her. Tweed converts the alarm clock into a warning signal should anyone approach his location. Frustrated at not capturing Tweed, the Japanese warn that if Tweed is not surrendered, dead or alive, after one month they will burn a farm in each district. Tweed, overcome with guilt, considers surrender but is stopped by Antonio and the priest's assistant. The two men take Tweed's dog-tags, stating they will "give him dead". Under the cover of night, the locals take the body of the recently deceased Shimoda to the sea, where his flesh is eaten by crabs, leaving only a skeleton with Tweed's dog-tags on it.

Antonio's family and the newly released priest and his assistant celebrate Christmas 1943 with Tweed, during which Tweed learns the Japanese military is reconfiguring forces in preparation for the US attack. Tweed discovers a Japanese gun position and, using a mirror, warns an American ship of the danger. Tweed asks Joe not to visit again because he fears it is too dangerous. Later that night, the American ship signals Tweed but inadvertently alerts the Japanese to his position. Tweed signals that he has vital information and manages to reach the safety of the ship, during which his Japanese pursuers are killed.

After the battle ends with an American victory, Tweed re-unites with Antonio and his family, embracing Joe on top of the rock where Tweed had successfully evaded the Japanese for so long.

== Cast ==
- Jeffrey Hunter as George R. Tweed
- Marshall Thompson as Jonn Sonnenberg
- Barbara Perez as 'Joe' Cruz
- Ronald Remy as Chico Torres
- Paul Edwards Jr. as Al Turney
- Rolf Bayer as Chief Schultz
- Vicente Liwanag as Vicente
- Fred Harris II as Roy Lund
- Lamberto V. Avellana as Mr. Shimoda
- Chichay as Mrs. Nakamura
- Antonio de la Mogueis as Florecito
- Vic Silayan as Major Hondo
- Bert Laforteza as Comdr. Oto Harada (as Bert La Fortesa)
- Eddie Infante as Sus Quitugua
- Nardo Ramos as Tumon
- Rosa Mia as Primera Quitugua
- Mike Anzures as Santos
- Bruno Punzalan as Himself
- Joseph de Cordova as Father Pangolin
- Mario Barri as Limtiaco
- Steve Joseph as Tommy Tanaka
- Ding Tello as Japanese sergeant major
- Bert Olivar as Antonio Cruz
- Nena Ledesma as Himself
- Veronica Palileo as Josefa Cruz
- Segundo Veloria as Himself

== Production ==
Hunter had previously appeared in another war biopic, Hell to Eternity.

During filming, a sailor and a Filipino civilian were killed while preparing an explosion for the film. It led to calls for servicemen not to be used as extras on films and for films to use civilian experts for special effects.

== Reception ==
Variety called it "second rate".
