= Antelope Creek (Todd County, South Dakota) =

Stream in South Dakota, U.S.

Coordinates: 43°13′38″N 100°23′18″W

Antelope Creek is a stream in the U.S. state of South Dakota.

Antelope Creek was named for the antelope, a native species in South Dakota.

== See also ==
- List of rivers of South Dakota
