= Antelope Creek (Harding County, South Dakota) =

Stream in South Dakota, U.S.

Coordinates: 45°37′29″N 103°55′41″W

Antelope Creek is a stream in the U.S. state of South Dakota.

Antelope Creek was named for the antelope native to the area.

== See also ==
- List of rivers of South Dakota
