= Antelope Creek (Missouri River tributary) =

Stream in South Dakota, U.S.

Coordinates: 44°18′52″N 100°10′21″W

Antelope Creek is a stream in the U.S. state of South Dakota. It is a tributary of the Missouri River.

Antelope Creek was named for the antelope native to the territory.

== See also ==
- List of rivers of South Dakota
