= Antelope Creek (Day County, South Dakota) =

Stream in South Dakota, U.S.

Coordinates: 45°33′42″N 97°58′12″W

Antelope Creek is a stream in the U.S. state of South Dakota.

Antelope Creek was named on account of antelope which frequented the area.

== See also ==
- List of rivers of South Dakota
