= Antelope Creek (Butte County, South Dakota) =

Stream in Butte County, South Dakota, USA

Coordinates: 45°01′07″N 103°33′32″W

Antelope Creek is a stream in the U.S. state of South Dakota.

Antelope Creek was after the antelope that were often seen by the stream in the summertime.

== See also ==
- List of rivers of South Dakota
