= Howard Prairie Lake =

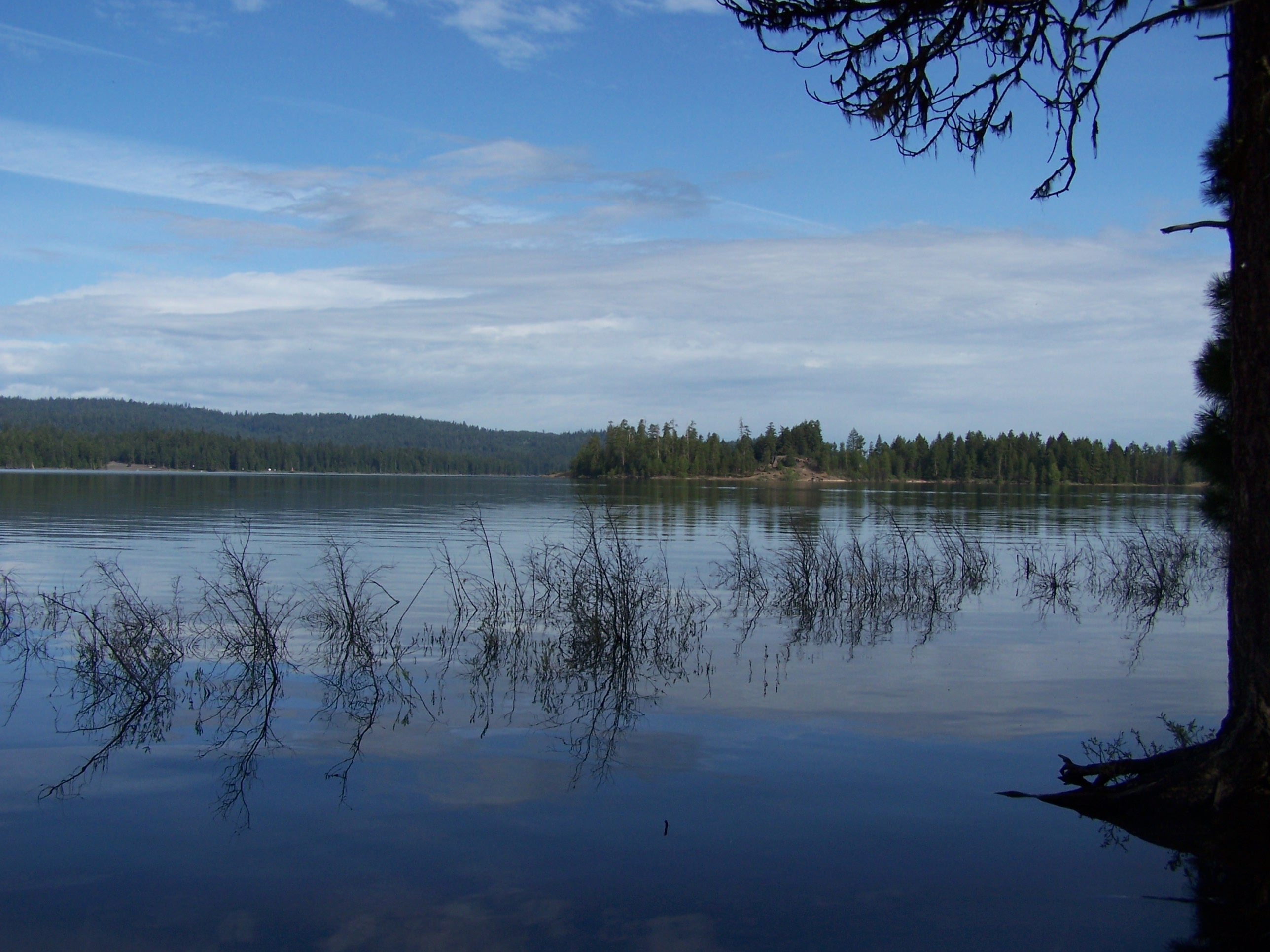
- Howard Prairie Lake from its southern shore

- Location within Oregon Location within the United States
- Location: Jackson County, Southern Oregon, United States
- Coordinates: 42°12′59″N 122°22′35″W
- Type: Reservoir
- Primary inflows: Water diverted from Little Butte Creek
- Primary outflows: Beaver Creek
- Catchment area: 79 square miles (205 km^{2})
- Basin countries: United States
- Surface area: 1,990 acres (8 km^{2})
- Average depth: 35 feet (11 m)
- Max. depth: 80 feet (24 m)
- Water volume: 62,100 acre-feet (76,599,200 m^{3})
- Surface elevation: 4,526 feet (1,380 m)
- Islands: Buck, Doe, and Fawn

Howard Prairie Lake is a reservoir located 4,526 feet (1,380 m) above sea level in Jackson County, Oregon, United States. It is 18 miles (29 km) east of Ashland. The lake is formed by the 100-foot (30 m) tall Howard Prairie Dam, which impounds Beaver Creek, in the Klamath River watershed.

== History ==
The reservoir was created in 1958 when the 100-foot (30 m) tall earth fill dam was completed by the Talent Division of the Rogue River Basin Project. A canal diverting water from nearby Little Butte Creek, (in the Rogue River watershed), to the lake was also completed.

== Statistics ==
Howard Prairie Lake has an average surface area of 1,990 acres (8 km^{2}), and an average volume of 62,100 acre-feet (76,599,200 m^{3}). It has a maximum depth of 80 feet (24 m), and an average depth of 35 feet (11 m). The lake has a 79-square-mile (205 km^{2}) drainage basin.

During the 2020–21 North American drought, the lake reached 4% capacity.

== Climate ==
Climate data for Howard Prairie Dam, Oregon, 1991–2020 normals, 1960–2020 extremes: 4567ft (1392m)
Month	Jan	Feb	Mar	Apr	May	Jun	Jul	Aug	Sep	Oct	Nov	Dec	Year
Record high °F (°C)	59 (15)	67 (19)	73 (23)	82 (28)	92 (33)	95 (35)	100 (38)	100 (38)	97 (36)	89 (32)	71 (22)	55 (13)	100 (38)
Mean maximum °F (°C)	47.7 (8.7)	52.5 (11.4)	61.9 (16.6)	70.5 (21.4)	79.6 (26.4)	86.1 (30.1)	91.6 (33.1)	91.4 (33.0)	87.0 (30.6)	76.3 (24.6)	58.1 (14.5)	45.7 (7.6)	92.2 (33.4)
Mean daily maximum °F (°C)	36.1 (2.3)	39.6 (4.2)	44.6 (7.0)	50.5 (10.3)	60.2 (15.7)	68.3 (20.2)	79.0 (26.1)	79.0 (26.1)	72.4 (22.4)	58.0 (14.4)	42.2 (5.7)	34.8 (1.6)	55.4 (13.0)
Daily mean °F (°C)	29.5 (−1.4)	31.6 (−0.2)	35.2 (1.8)	40.0 (4.4)	47.9 (8.8)	54.3 (12.4)	62.9 (17.2)	62.3 (16.8)	56.1 (13.4)	45.5 (7.5)	35.0 (1.7)	28.8 (−1.8)	44.1 (6.7)
Mean daily minimum °F (°C)	23.0 (−5.0)	23.5 (−4.7)	25.9 (−3.4)	29.5 (−1.4)	35.5 (1.9)	40.4 (4.7)	46.8 (8.2)	45.6 (7.6)	39.9 (4.4)	33.1 (0.6)	27.8 (−2.3)	22.7 (−5.2)	32.8 (0.5)
Mean minimum °F (°C)	8.8 (−12.9)	11.4 (−11.4)	14.6 (−9.7)	22.0 (−5.6)	27.0 (−2.8)	31.7 (−0.2)	37.7 (3.2)	37.9 (3.3)	31.2 (−0.4)	24.0 (−4.4)	16.0 (−8.9)	9.7 (−12.4)	4.0 (−15.6)
Record low °F (°C)	−20 (−29)	−20 (−29)	−2 (−19)	6 (−14)	20 (−7)	26 (−3)	29 (−2)	29 (−2)	22 (−6)	8 (−13)	1 (−17)	−20 (−29)	−20 (−29)
Average precipitation inches (mm)	4.67 (119)	3.76 (96)	3.67 (93)	2.66 (68)	2.04 (52)	1.03 (26)	0.49 (12)	0.39 (9.9)	0.68 (17)	2.00 (51)	3.97 (101)	5.92 (150)	31.28 (794.9)
Average snowfall inches (cm)	25.40 (64.5)	23.50 (59.7)	16.00 (40.6)	9.20 (23.4)	1.20 (3.0)	0.10 (0.25)	0.00 (0.00)	0.00 (0.00)	0.10 (0.25)	1.00 (2.5)	14.80 (37.6)	26.30 (66.8)	117.6 (298.6)
Average extreme snow depth inches (cm)	28 (71)	30 (76)	27 (69)	9 (23)	1 (2.5)	0 (0)	0 (0)	0 (0)	0 (0)	1 (2.5)	8 (20)	20 (51)	38 (97)
Average precipitation days (≥ 0.01 in)	14.7	13.7	15.6	13.4	10.8	5.2	2.2	2.0	3.6	7.7	13.6	15.5	118
Average snowy days (≥ 0.1 in)	8.7	8.2	7.3	4.7	0.6	0.0	0.0	0.0	0.1	0.7	5.3	9.1	44.7
Source 1: NOAA
Source 2: XMACIS2 (records, monthly max/mins & 1991-2020 snow depth)

== Flora and fauna ==
Howard Prairie Lake is known for its large number of rainbow trout, largemouth bass, and smallmouth bass. Ducks and geese inhabit the surrounding regions. The lake is surrounded by pine and fir forests in the Cascade Mountains.

== Recreation ==
Boating, water skiing, fishing, and camping at the three public campgrounds are popular activities at the lake. Hiking and biking are also popular on trails around the lake. The Howard Prairie Lake Resort is located on the northern shore of the lake and features a large marina, boat ramp, restaurant, campground, and convenience store.

== See also ==
- List of lakes in Oregon
