= White City, Oregon =

Unincorporated community in the state of Oregon, United States

- Census-designated place
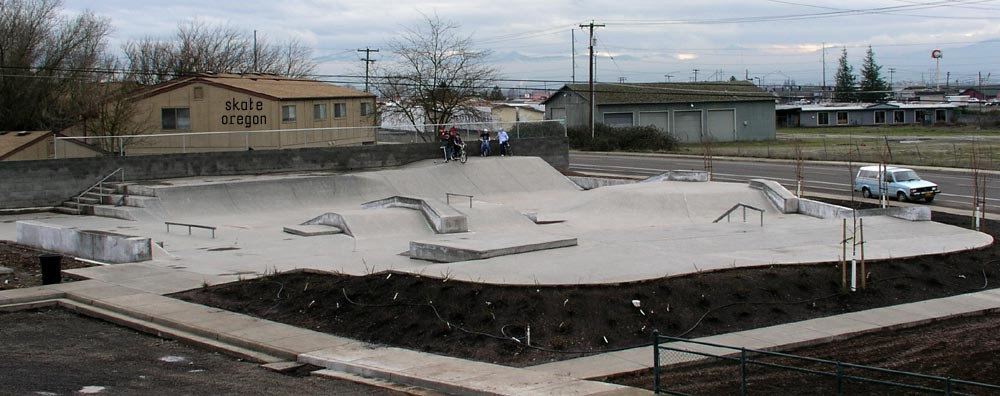
- Josephson Skate Park in White City

- Location of White City, Oregon
- Coordinates: 42°25′54″N 122°49′56″W
- Country: United States
- State: Oregon
- County: Jackson

Area
  - Total: 1.86 sq mi (4.83 km^{2})
  - Land: 1.86 sq mi (4.83 km^{2})
  - Water: 0 sq mi (0.00 km^{2})
- Elevation: 1,348 ft (411 m)

Population (2020)
  - Total: 9,090
  - Density: 4,873/sq mi (1,881.6/km^{2})
- Time zone: UTC-8 (Pacific (PST))
  - Summer (DST): UTC-7 (PDT)
- ZIP code: 97503
- Area code: 541
- FIPS code: 41-81450
- GNIS feature ID: 2409581

White City is an unincorporated community and census-designated place (CDP) in Jackson County, Oregon, United States. The population was 9,090 at the 2020 census, up from 7,975 at the 2010 census. White City is about 9 miles (14 km) north of the center of Medford and 4 miles (6 km) south of Eagle Point. White City is located within the Rogue Valley.

== Geography ==
According to the United States Census Bureau, the White City CDP has a total area of 1.9 square miles (4.8 km^{2}), all of it land.

=== Climate ===
This region experiences warm and dry summers, with no average monthly temperatures above 71.6 °F (22.0 °C). According to the Köppen Climate Classification system, White City has a warm-summer Mediterranean climate, abbreviated "Csb" on climate maps.

== Demographics ==
Historical population
Census	Pop.	Note	%±
1980	5,445		—
1990	5,891		8.2%
2000	5,466		−7.2%
2010	7,975		45.9%
2020	9,090		14.0%

=== 2020 census ===
As of the 2020 census, White City had a population of 9,090. The median age was 33.1 years. 27.5% of residents were under the age of 18 and 10.7% of residents were 65 years of age or older. For every 100 females there were 99.4 males, and for every 100 females age 18 and over there were 99.0 males age 18 and over.

100.0% of residents lived in urban areas, while 0.0% lived in rural areas.

There were 2,932 households in White City, of which 40.0% had children under the age of 18 living in them. Of all households, 47.9% were married-couple households, 17.1% were households with a male householder and no spouse or partner present, and 24.6% were households with a female householder and no spouse or partner present. About 18.2% of all households were made up of individuals and 7.3% had someone living alone who was 65 years of age or older.

There were 2,999 housing units, of which 2.2% were vacant. The homeowner vacancy rate was 1.2% and the rental vacancy rate was 1.9%.

Racial composition as of the 2020 census
Race	Number	Percent
White	5,671	62.4%
Black or African American	63	0.7%
American Indian and Alaska Native	145	1.6%
Asian	85	0.9%
Native Hawaiian and Other Pacific Islander	34	0.4%
Some other race	1,699	18.7%
Two or more races	1,393	15.3%
Hispanic or Latino (of any race)	3,202	35.2%

=== 2010 census ===
As of the 2010 U.S. census, there were 7,975 people, 2,431 households, and 1,865 families residing in the CDP. There were 3,018 housing units, of which 587, or 19.4%, were vacant. The racial makeup of the CDP was 74.7% White, 1.3% African American, 1.3% Native American, 0.8% Asian, 0.1% Pacific Islander, 17.8% some other race, and 3.9% from two or more races. Hispanic or Latino of any race were 28.8% of the population.

Of the 2,431 households in the CDP, 42.5% had children under the age of 18 living with them, 53.2% were headed by married couples living together, 16.0% had a female householder with no husband present, and 23.3% were non-families. 17.0% of all households were made up of individuals, and 5.1% were someone living alone who was 65 years of age or older. The average household size was 3.08 and the average family size was 3.43.

29.8% of the residents in the CDP were under the age of 18, 9.4% were from ages 18 to 24, 28.5% were from 25 to 44, 23.7% were from 45 to 64, and 8.5% were 65 years of age or older. The median age was 31.6 years. For every 100 females, there were 111.8 males. For every 100 females age 18 and over, there were 115.4 males.

=== 2012–2016 American Community Survey ===
For the period 2012-2016, the estimated median annual income for a household in the CDP was $44,940, and the median income for a family was $48,503. Male full-time workers had a median income of $35,333 versus $27,551 for females. The per capita income for the CDP was $15,368. About 15.2% of families and 19.6% of the population were below the poverty line, including 17.3% of those under age 18 and 17.4% of those age 65 or over.

=== Other statistics ===
In 2009, the estimated cost-of-living index in White City was 90.1, which is below the U.S. average of 100.

== Parks and recreation ==
The Oregon Department of Fish and Wildlife's Denman Wildlife Area has segments north and south of White City. The TouVelle State Recreation Site is located along Table Rock Road where it crosses the Rogue River. Furthermore, The Nature Conservancy's Agate Desert Preserve is on the west side of White City.

== Transportation ==
White City is located at the junction of Oregon Route 62 and Oregon Route 140. White City is also served by RVTD Route 60 connecting to Medford, and by the Southwest POINT bus service, which is an intercity route connecting to a number of Southern Oregon cities.

Freight rail service is provided to the White City Industrial Park by Rogue Valley Terminal Railroad.

== Facilities ==
White City hosts the main United States Department of Veterans Affairs hospital serving southern Oregon.
