= Antelope Creek (Tehama County) =

Stream in Tehama County, California, US

Coordinates: 40.1618°N 122.1342°W

Antelope Creek is a tributary of the Sacramento River, located in the Lassen National Forest in Tehama County, California. The creek is home to both spring-run Chinook salmon and steelhead trout.

The name "Antelope Creek" is a faithful translation of the old Spanish name Arroyo de los Berrendos.
