= TouVelle State Recreation Site =

State park in Jackson County, Oregon, U.S.

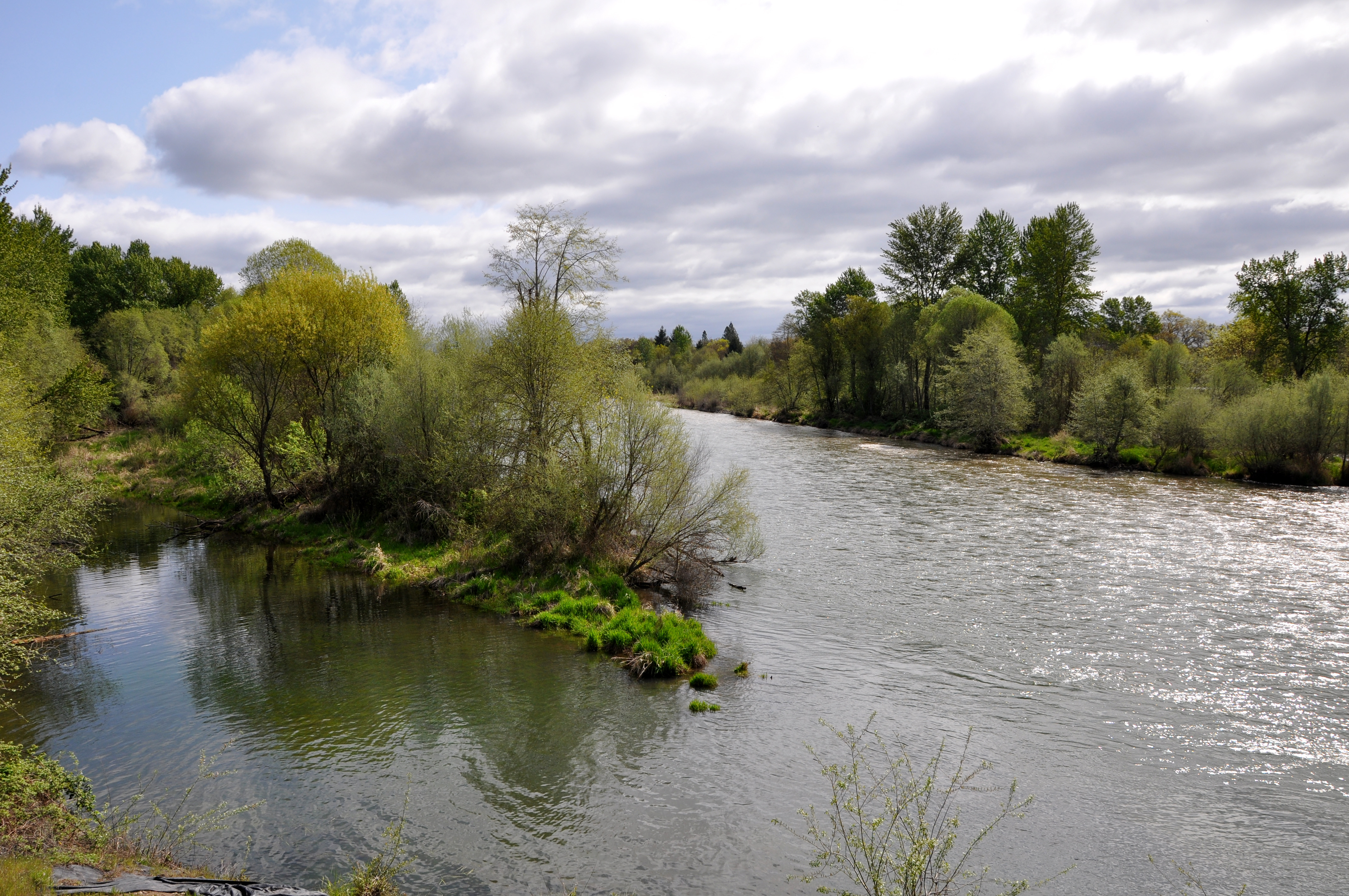
- The Rogue River at TouVelle

- Location within Oregon Location within the United States
- Type: Public, state
- Location: Jackson County, Oregon
- Nearest city: Medford
- Coordinates: 42°26′31″N 122°53′25″W
- Operator: Oregon Parks and Recreation Department

TouVelle State Recreation Site is a state park, administered by Oregon Parks and Recreation Department, and located in Jackson County, Oregon, United States, 9 miles (14 km) north of Medford, where Table Rock Road crosses the Rogue River. This 51-acre (210,000 m^{2}) park is used for fishing, birding, hiking (in the adjacent Denman Wildlife Area), picnicking and swimming. There is also a boat ramp, which lies at the lower end of an easily navigated stretch of the Rogue. A daily user-fee or annual permit is required.
