= Eagle Point, Oregon =

- City
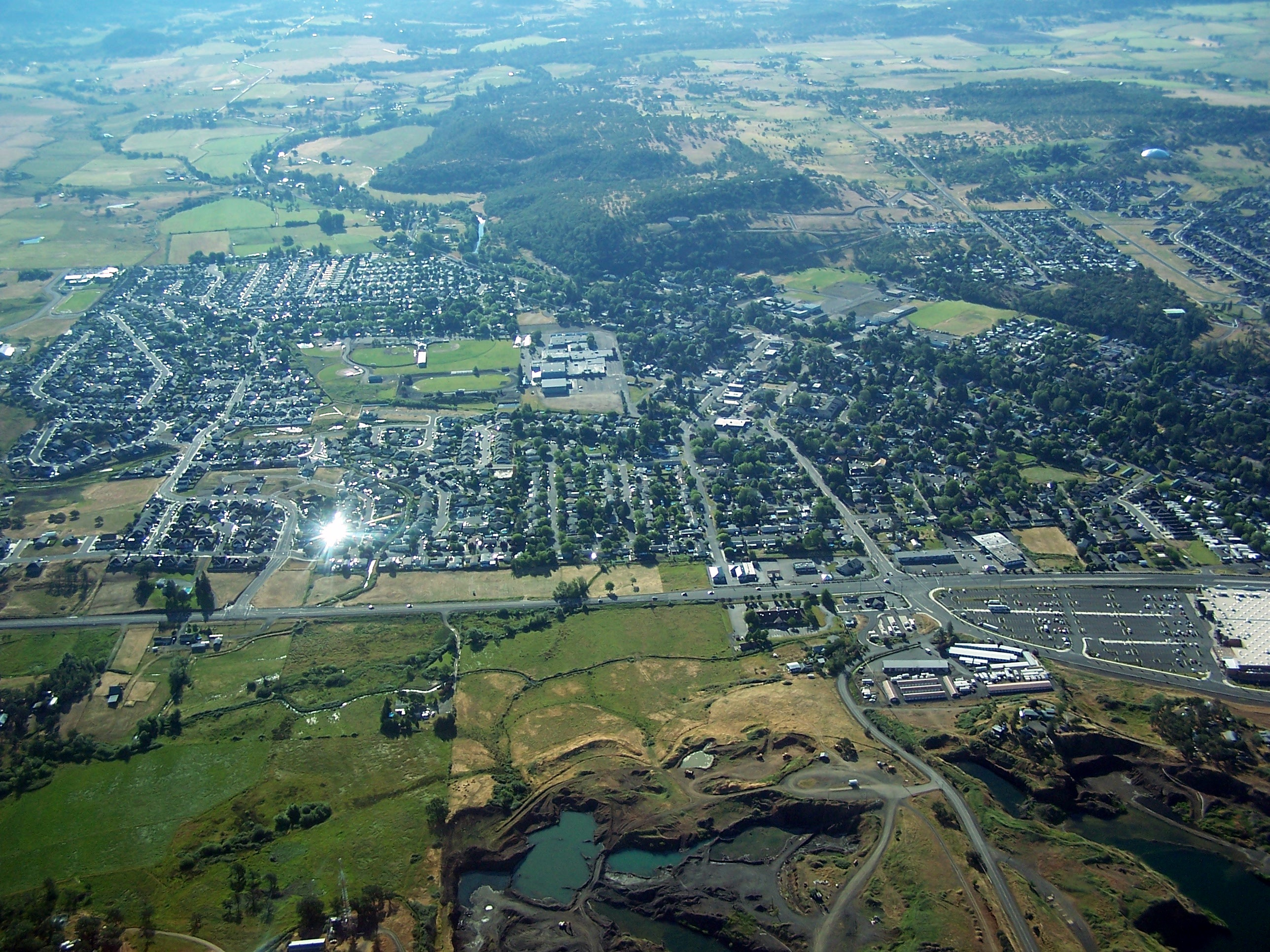
- An aerial image of Eagle Point
- Nickname: Gateway to the Lakes
- Location in Oregon
- Coordinates: 42°28′04″N 122°48′06″W
- Country: United States
- State: Oregon
- County: Jackson
- Incorporated: 1911

Government
  - Mayor: Kathy Sell

Area
  - Total: 2.97 sq mi (7.69 km^{2})
  - Land: 2.97 sq mi (7.69 km^{2})
  - Water: 0 sq mi (0.00 km^{2})
- Elevation: 1,296 ft (395 m)

Population (2020)
  - Total: 9,686
  - Density: 3,263.2/sq mi (1,259.94/km^{2})
- Time zone: UTC-8 (Pacific)
  - Summer (DST): UTC-7 (Pacific)
- ZIP code: 97524
- Area code: 541
- FIPS code: 41-21550
- GNIS feature ID: 2410382
- Website: www.cityofeaglepoint.org

Eagle Point is a city in Jackson County, Oregon, United States. The population was around 9,783 at the 2023 census, up from 8,469 at the 2010 census.

== History ==
In the mid-19th century, a rocky cliff near the location of what later became Eagle Point was a favored nesting place for eagles. An area resident, John Mathews, is said to have suggested "Eagle Point" as the name for a proposed post office in the community. The post office was established in 1872; Andrew McNeil was the first postmaster.

A water-powered gristmill, Butte Creek Mill, has operated in Eagle Point for more than 125 years. Built in 1872 along Little Butte Creek, it was added to the National Register of Historic Places in 1976. The mill burned to the ground Christmas Day 2015. The Butte Creek Mill has been rebuilt, with its first batch of grain sold in December 2020. On May 15, 2016, Actor Jim Belushi performed at an outdoor benefit concert for the Butte Creek Mill. In 2018, Actor Patrick Duffy, a longtime Eagle Point resident signed-on as the Advisory Director for the Butte Creek Mill Foundation in an effort to rebuild the Butte Creek Mill. He joins actor Jim Belushi who has been a supporter of the mill since the fire.

In 2018, Eagle Point Police Officer Daniel Cardenas shot and killed Matthew Graves. According to attorneys Kelly L. Anderson and David Linthorst, the “arrest” of Graves on mere suspicion alone is not grounds to detain him. “After making an unlawful arrest,” attorneys said, “Cardenas compounded the problem by using excessive force. In doing so, Cardenas himself created the very crisis for which he later claimed to have needed to use deadly force.”. Cardenas also made multiple discrepancies during his Grand Jury testimony which went against his protest of innocence. The city had to pay 4.5 Million Dollars for wrongful death.

== Geography ==
According to the United States Census Bureau, the city has a total area of 2.96 square miles (7.67 km^{2}), all of it land.

The city is north of Medford and White City and south of Shady Cove in the Rogue River Valley along Oregon Route 62. Little Butte Creek, a tributary of the Rogue River, passes through Eagle Point and enters the larger stream a few miles to the west near TouVelle State Recreation Site and Upper and Lower Table Rock.

=== Climate ===
This region has historically experienced warm (but not hot) and dry summers, with no average monthly temperatures above 71.6 °F (22.0 °C). According to the Köppen Climate Classification system, Eagle Point has a warm-summer Mediterranean climate, abbreviated "Csb" on climate maps. However, summers have been getting hotter and drier with increased risk of extreme weather, especially heat waves, due to climate change.

== Demographics ==
Historical population
Census	Pop.	Note	%±
1920	128		—
1930	211		64.8%
1940	243		15.2%
1950	607		149.8%
1960	752		23.9%
1970	1,241		65.0%
1980	2,764		122.7%
1990	3,008		8.8%
2000	4,798		59.5%
2010	8,469		76.5%
2020	9,686		14.4%
2021 (est.)	9,865		1.8%
U.S. Decennial Census

=== 2020 census ===
As of the 2020 census, Eagle Point had a population of 9,686. The median age was 42.1 years. 23.1% of residents were under the age of 18 and 22.0% of residents were 65 years of age or older. For every 100 females there were 95.4 males, and for every 100 females age 18 and over there were 92.2 males.

99.5% of residents lived in urban areas, while 0.5% lived in rural areas.

There were 3,753 households in Eagle Point, of which 31.3% had children under the age of 18 living in them. Of all households, 54.3% were married-couple households, 14.4% were households with a male householder and no spouse or partner present, and 23.1% were households with a female householder and no spouse or partner present. About 21.0% of all households were made up of individuals and 12.8% had someone living alone who was 65 years of age or older.

There were 3,896 housing units, of which 3.7% were vacant. Among occupied housing units, 75.2% were owner-occupied and 24.8% were renter-occupied. The homeowner vacancy rate was 1.6% and the rental vacancy rate was 5.0%.

Racial composition as of the 2020 census
Race	Number	Percent
White	8,200	84.7%
Black or African American	69	0.7%
American Indian and Alaska Native	117	1.2%
Asian	96	1.0%
Native Hawaiian and Other Pacific Islander	19	0.2%
Some other race	253	2.6%
Two or more races	932	9.6%
Hispanic or Latino (of any race)	926	9.6%

=== 2023 estimates ===
At the 2023 census, there were 9,783 people and 3,527 households in the city. The population density was 3,295.9 inhabitants per square mile. There were 3,724 housing units in the city. The racial makeup of the city was 85% White, 1.1% African American, 0.2% Native American, 0.3% Asian, 0.05% from other races, and 4.1% from two or more races. Hispanic or Latino of any race were 9.2% of the population.

Of the 3,527 households 63% were married couples living together, 16% had a female householder, 7% had a male householder, and 14% were non-families. The average household size was 2.8 people. The median age was 36.1 years old.

=== 2000 census ===
At the 2000 census, there were 4,797 people, 1,703 households, and 1,313 families living in the city. The population density was 1,869.9 inhabitants per square mile (722.0/km^{2}). There were 1,823 housing units at an average density of 710.6 per square mile (274.4/km^{2}). The racial makeup of the city was 93.16% White, 0.38% African American, 1.73% Native American, 0.40% Asian, 0.19% Pacific Islander, 1.10% from other races, and 3.04% from two or more races. Hispanic or Latino of any race were 3.52% of the population.

Of the 1,703 households 45.6% had children under the age of 18 living with them, 56.9% were married couples living together, 14.6% had a female householder with no husband present, and 22.9% were non-families. 18.1% of households were one person and 8.1% were one person aged 65 or older. The average household size was 2.82 and the average family size was 3.17. In the city, the population was 32.6% under the age of 18, 9.4% from 18 to 24, 29.2% from 25 to 44, 19.7% from 45 to 64, and 9.1% 65 or older. The median age was 30 years. For every 100 females, there were 93.2 males. For every 100 females age 18 and over, there were 89.7 males. The median household income was $37,557 and the median family income was $40,598. Males had a median income of $30,795 versus $20,956 for females. The per capita income for the city was $15,501. About 11.4% of families and 12.8% of the population were below the poverty line, including 18.7% of those under age 18 and 15.1% of those age 65 or over.

== Notable people ==
- Jim Belushi, television actor, comedian and singer, star of Saturday Night Live and According to Jim
- Patrick Duffy, television actor, star of Dallas, Step by Step and The Bold and the Beautiful
- Tyrone Holmes, American football player.
- Larry Lansburgh (1911–2001), American producer, director, and screenwriter
- Kim Novak, actress, star of Vertigo, Picnic, and The Man with the Golden Arm
- Nathan Pine, current director of athletics at the United States Air Force Academy
- Matt Ross, screenwriter, actor, and director known for roles in Big Love and Silicon Valley

== See also ==
- Denman Wildlife Area, near Eagle Point
- Eagle Point National Cemetery
