= Grizzly Peak Winery =

Winery in the U.S. state of Oregon

- Logo
- Location: 1600 E. Nevada Street, Ashland, Oregon, United States
- Coordinates: 42°13′15.0″N 122°40′41.6″W
- Founded: 2006
- Website: grizzlypeakwinery.com

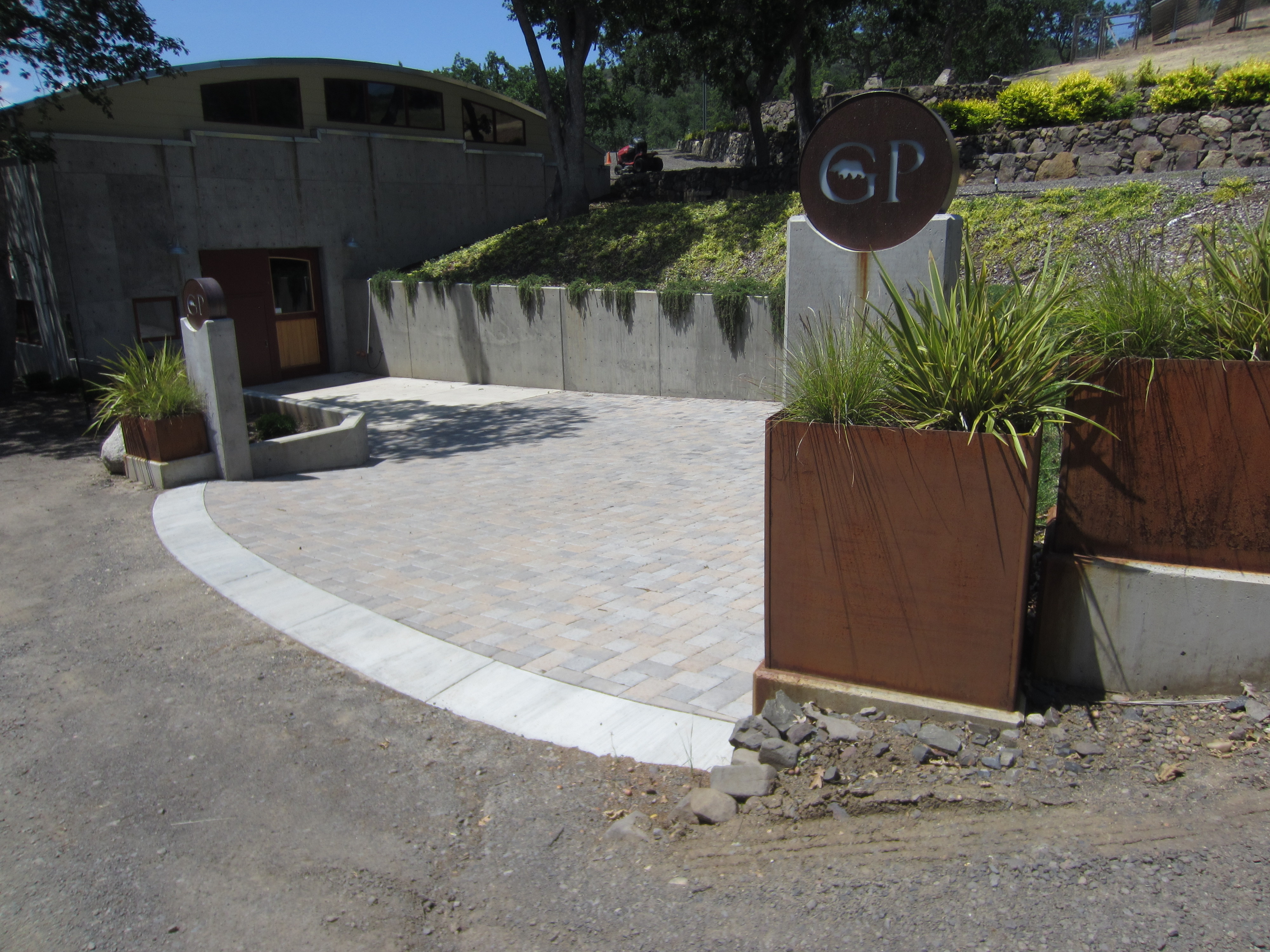
The winery, 2019

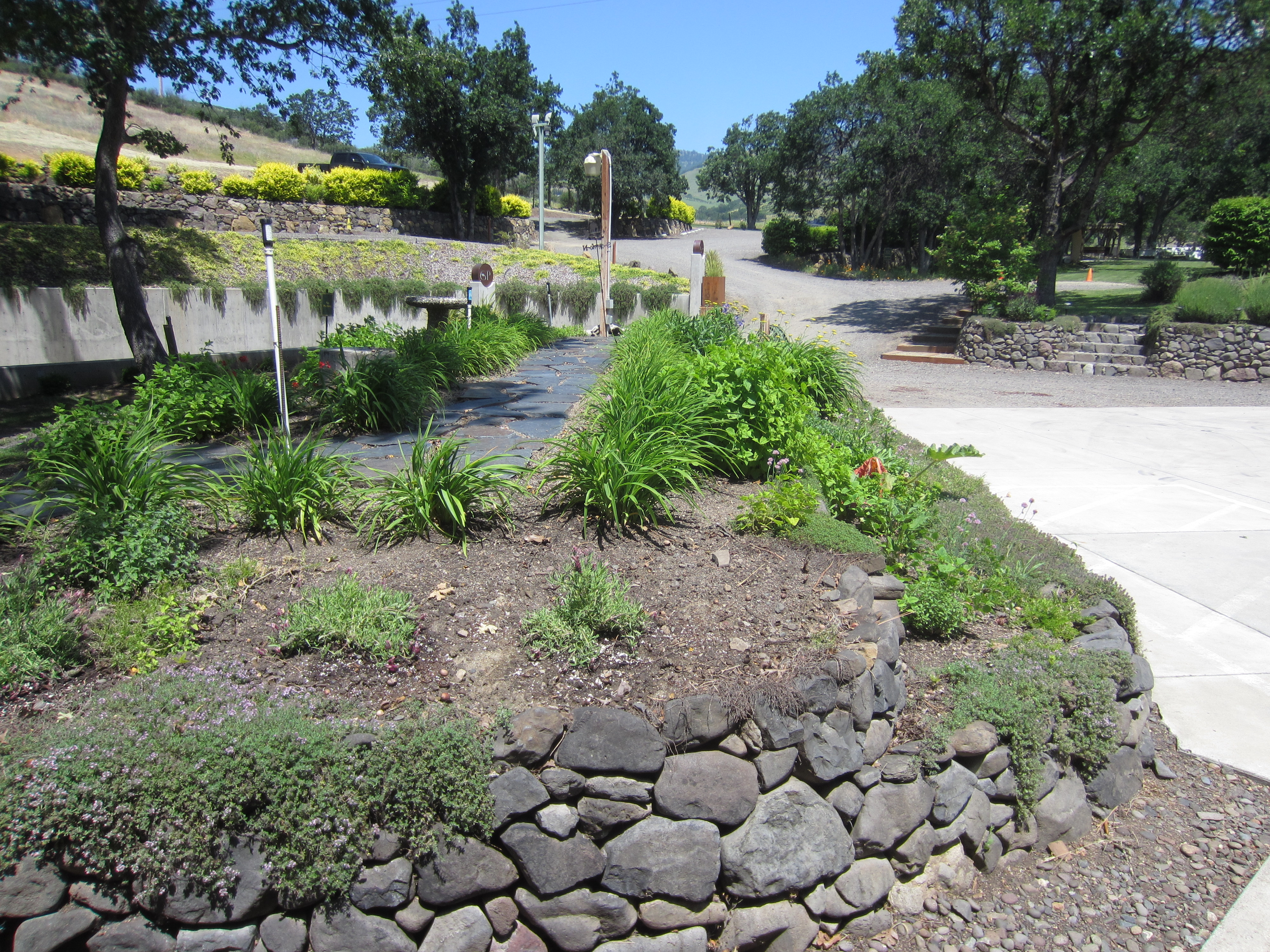
The grounds in 2019

Grizzly Peak Winery is a winery near Grizzly Peak in Ashland, Oregon, United States.

== History ==
Grizzly Peak was established by Al and Virginia Silbowitz, with assistance from winemaker Andy Swan of Granite Peak Winery. Grizzly Peak and Granite Peak started collaborating in 2006. Grizzly's tasting room opened in 2008. The winery was recognized at the Oregon Wine Experience in 2015 and 2017.
