= Chinookan peoples =

Indigenous people of the United States

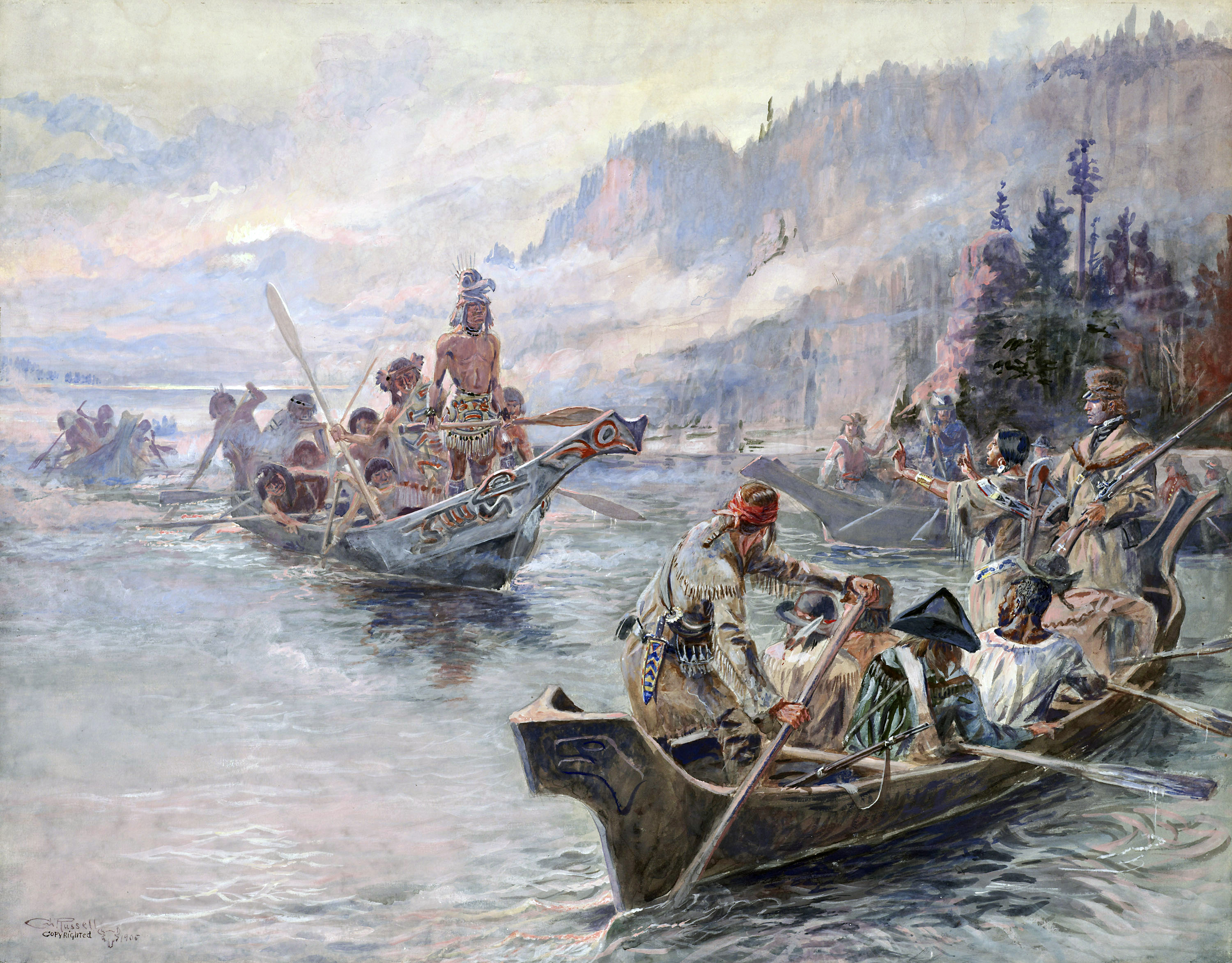
- Chinook people meet the Corps of Discovery on the Lower Columbia, October 1805 (by Charles M. Russell, 1905)

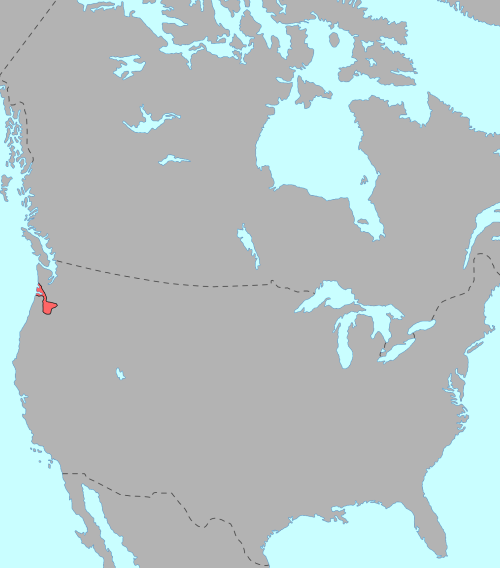
- Location of Chinookan territory early in the 19th century

Total population
- 2,700

Regions with significant populations
- United States (Oregon – Washington)

Languages
- English, formerly Chinookan languages

Religion
- traditional tribal religion

Chinookan peoples include several groups of Indigenous people of the Pacific Northwest in the United States who speak the Chinookan languages. Since at least 11,500 BCE, Chinookan peoples and their ancestors have resided along the upper and Middle Columbia River (Wimahl) ("Great River") from the river's gorge (near the present town of The Dalles, Oregon) downstream (west) to the river's mouth, and along adjacent portions of the coasts, from Tillamook Head of present-day Oregon in the south, north to Willapa Bay in southwest Washington. In 1805 the Lewis and Clark Expedition encountered the Chinook Tribe on the lower Columbia.

The term "Chinook" also has a wider meaning in reference to the Chinook Jargon, which is based on Chinookan languages, in part. So the term "Chinookan" was coined by linguists to distinguish the older language from its offspring, Chinuk Wawa. There are several theories about where the name "Chinook" came from. Some say it is a Chehalis word Tsinúk for the inhabitants of a particular village site on Baker Bay, or "Fish Eaters." It may also be a word meaning "strong fighters."

Some Chinookan peoples are part of several federally recognized Tribes: the Yakama Nation (primarily Wishram), the Confederated Tribes of the Warm Springs Reservation (primarily Wasco), and the Confederated Tribes of the Grand Ronde Community.

The Chinook Indian Nation, consisting of the five westernmost tribes of Chinookan peoples (Lower Chinook, Clatsop, Willapa, Wahkiakum, and Kathlamet), is currently working to restore federal recognition, as of 2024. The Chinook Nation gained Federal Recognition on January 3, 2001 from the Department of Interior under President Bill Clinton. After President George W. Bush was elected, his political appointees reviewed the case and, in a highly unusual action, revoked the recognition.

The unrecognized Tchinouk Indians of Oregon trace their Chinook ancestry to two Chinook women who married French Canadians traders from the Hudson's Bay Company before 1830. The specific Chinook band these women were from or if they were Lower or Upper Chinook, could not be determined. These individuals, settled in the French Prairie region of northwestern Oregon, became part of the community of French Canadians and Métis (Mix-Bloods). There is no evidence that they are a distinct Indian community within French Prairie. The Chinook Indian Nation denied that the Tchinouk had any common history with them or any organizational affiliation. On January 16, 1986, the Bureau of Indian Affairs determined that the Tchinouk Indians of Oregon do not meet the requirements necessary to be a federally recognized tribe.

The unrecognized Clatsop-Nehalem Confederate Tribes was formed in 2000. The Clatsop-Nehalem have approximately 130 members and claim to have Chinookan and Salish-speaking Tillamook (Nehalem) ancestry. This is contested by the Chinook Indian Nation. The Indian Claims Commission, Docket 234, found, in 1957, that the Clatsop Chinooks were part of the Chinook Indian Nation. The Indian Claims Commission also found in Docket 240, 1962, that the Nehalem people were part of the Confederated Tribes of Siletz Indians.

== Historic culture ==
=== Practices and lifestyle ===
The Chinookan peoples were relatively settled and occupied traditional tribal geographic areas, where they hunted and fished; salmon was a mainstay of their diet. The women also gathered and processed many nuts, seeds, roots, and other foods. They had a society marked by social stratification, consisting of several distinct social castes of greater or lesser status. Upper castes included shamans, warriors, and successful traders. They composed a minority of the community population compared to common members. Members of the superior castes are said to have practiced social discrimination, limiting contact with commoners and forbidding play between the children of the different social groups.

Some Chinookan peoples practiced slavery, a practice borrowed from the northernmost tribes of the Pacific Northwest. They took slaves as captives in warfare and used them to practice thievery on behalf of their masters. The latter refrained from such practices as unworthy of high status.

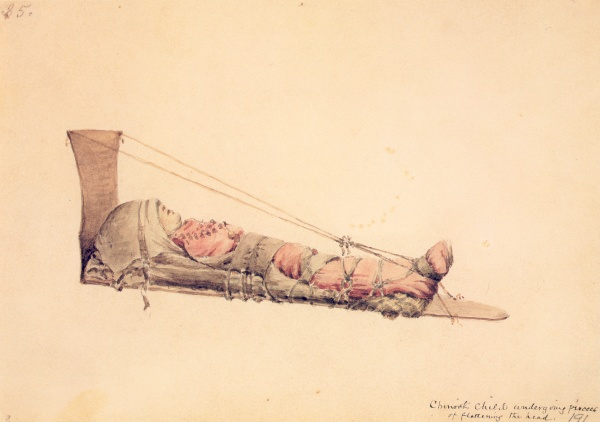
Chinook child undergoing process of flattening the head.

The elite of some tribes had the practice of head binding, flattening their children's foreheads and the top of the skull as a mark of social status. They bound the infant's head under pressure between boards when the infant was about 3 months old and continued until the child was about one year of age. This custom was a means of marking social hierarchy; flat-headed community members had a rank above those with round heads. Those with flattened skulls refused to enslave other persons who were similarly marked, thereby reinforcing the association of a round head with servility. The Chinook were known colloquially by early white explorers in the region as "Flathead Indians".

Living near the coast of the Pacific Ocean, the Chinook were skilled elk hunters and fishermen. The most popular fish was salmon. Owing partly to their settled living patterns, the Chinook and other coastal tribes had relatively little conflict over land, as they did not migrate through each other's territories, and they had rich resources in the natural environment. In the manner of numerous settled tribes, the Chinook resided in longhouses. More than fifty people, related through extended kinship, often resided in one longhouse. Their longhouses were made of planks made from red cedar trees. The houses were about 20–60 feet wide and 50–150 feet long.

=== Language and storytelling ===
==== Franz Boas (1858–1942) ====
In 1888, Franz Boas published "The Journal of American Folk-Lore", a journal discussing American folklore. Here, he describes some "Chinook songs" and offers them in both the Chinook language and English translation.

The "Native Legends of Oregon and Washington Collected" is a collection of Chinook legends and stories written and collected by Boas in 1893. It was a collection of different Chinook folklore taken from his time spent with the Chinookan people between the years of 1890 and 1891 during his summer trips to Oregon and Washington.

He also wrote the "Chinook Texts", which was published in 1894. In this reference book, Boas includes various myths, beliefs, customs, tales, and historical tales, as told by the Chinookan people themselves.

==== George Gibbs (1815–1873) ====
George Gibbs was another popular anthropologist of his time. He collected the "Alphabetical Vocabulary of the Chinook Language". Gibbs was assisted by Robert Shortess and Solomon H. Smith of Oregon and A. C. Anderson of Victoria, Vancouver Island. The many words were collected and scattered from various tribes, given the scarcity of the Chinookan people at the time. The book was mainly written for trading purposes, and Gibbs collected the majority of his translation from the traders themselves.

== Chinook people today ==
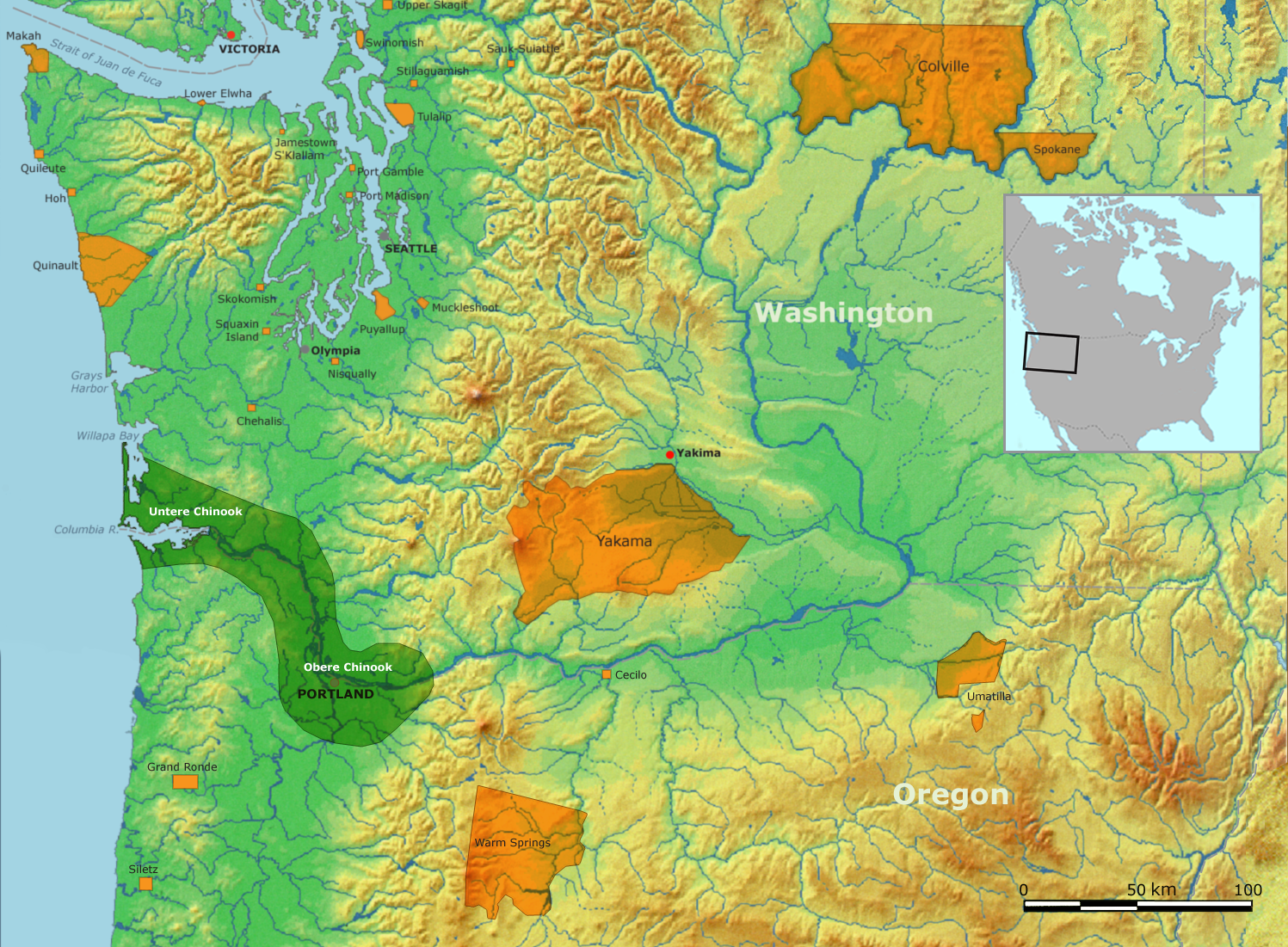
Map of traditional Chinook tribal territory.

The Chinookan peoples have long had a community on the lower Columbia River. These lower Columbia Chinook tribes and bands re-organized in the 20th century, setting up an elected form of government and reviving tribal culture. They first sought recognition as a federally recognized sovereign tribe in the late 20th century, as this would provide certain treaty-promised benefits for education and welfare. The Department of Interior's Bureau of Indian Affairs rejected their application in 1997. Since the late 20th century, the Chinook Indian Nation has engaged in a continuing effort to secure formal recognition, conducting research and developing documentation to demonstrate its history. They are referred to in government and historic accounts, but treaties signed at Tansy Point in 1851 were not acted upon by Congress through a formal ratification process. This inaction caused the Chinook territories defined in the treaties to remain unceded. Nevertheless, these territories were taken by the federal government. If Congress had formally ratified the treaties, a reservation would have been established, which would have meant automatic recognition.

In 2001, the U.S. Department of Interior recognized the Chinook Indian Nation, a confederation of the Cathlamet, Clatsop, Lower Chinook, Wahkiakum and Willapa Indians, as a tribe, according to its rules established in consultation with other recognized tribes. The tribe had documented continuity of their community over time on the lower Columbia. This recognition was announced during the last months of the administration of President Bill Clinton. Since the 1930s, individual Chinook people have had Allotments on the timber-rich Quinault Reservation in Grays Harbor County, Washington. The Quinault appealed recognition of the Chinook in August 2001, and the matter was taken up by the new administration.

After President George W. Bush was elected, his new political appointees reviewed the Chinook materials. In 2002, in a highly unusual action, they revoked the recognition of the Chinook and of two other tribes also approved by the previous administration. Efforts by Brian Baird, D-Wash. from Washington's 3rd congressional district, to gain passage of legislation in 2011 to achieve recognition of the tribe were not successful. In his decision on a lawsuit filed in late 2017, U.S. District Court Judge Ronald B. Leighton ruled recognition could only be granted from Congress and other branches of government, but largely sided with the tribe; Leighton denied seven of eight claims by the Interior Department to dismiss the case, including a challenge to a 2015 rule that bars tribes from seeking recognition again. The Chinook Indian Nation's offices are in Bay Center, Washington. The tribe holds an Annual Winter Gathering at the plankhouse in Ridgefield, Washington. It also holds an Annual First Salmon Ceremony at Chinook Point (Fort Columbia) on the North Shore of the Columbia River. In 2019, the Chinook Indian Nation purchased ten acres of the 1851 Tansy Point treaty grounds.

In the 21st century, a large proportion of Chinook people live in the regions surrounding the towns of Bay Center, Chinook, and Ilwaco in southwest Washington and in Astoria, Oregon.

== List of Chinookan peoples ==
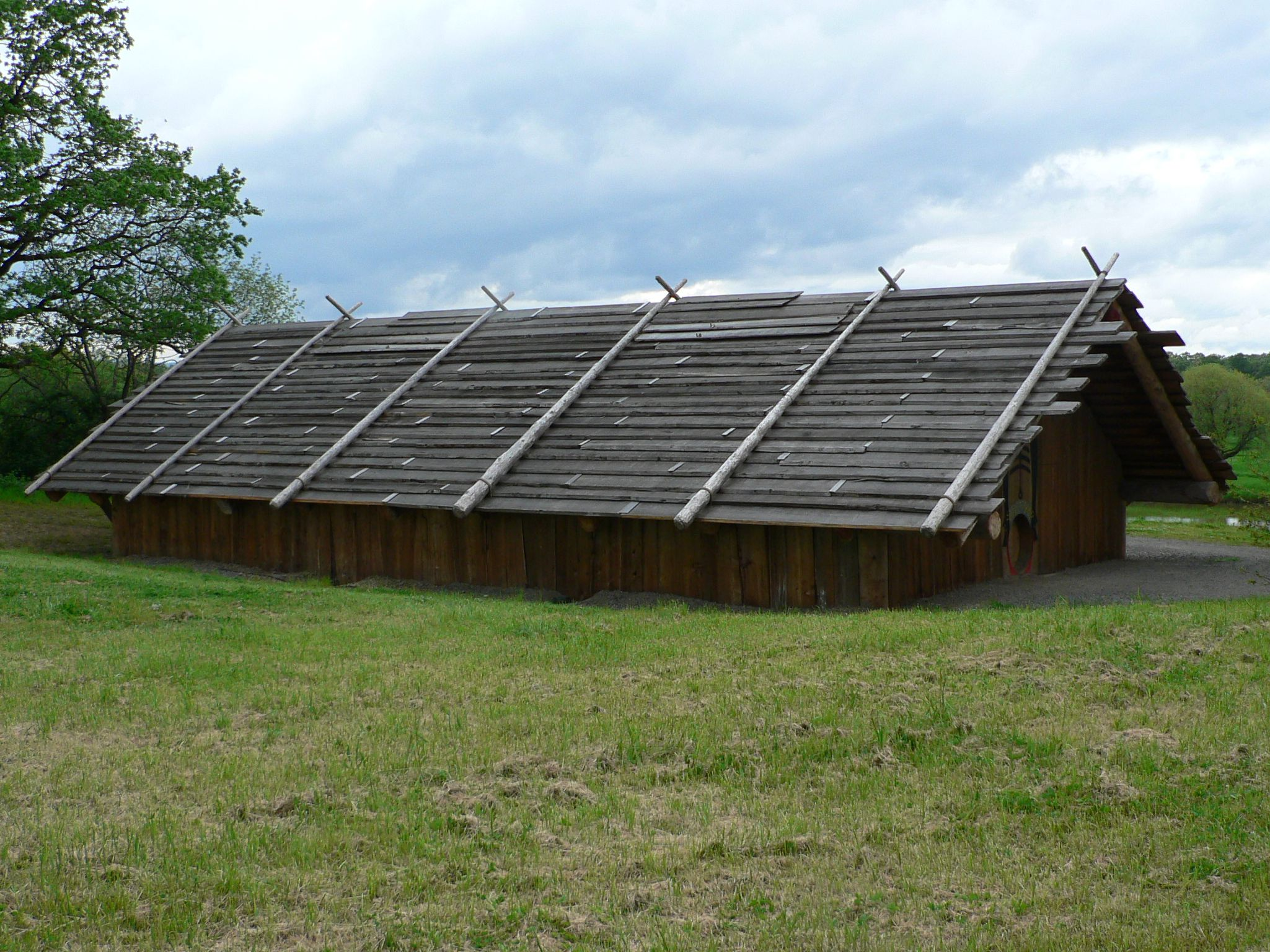
Cathlapotle Plankhouse, a full-scale replica of a Chinook-style cedar plankhouse erected in 2005 at the Ridgefield National Wildlife Refuge; the original and thirteen others like like it housed more than 1200 Chinook people at Cathlapotle village in 1806

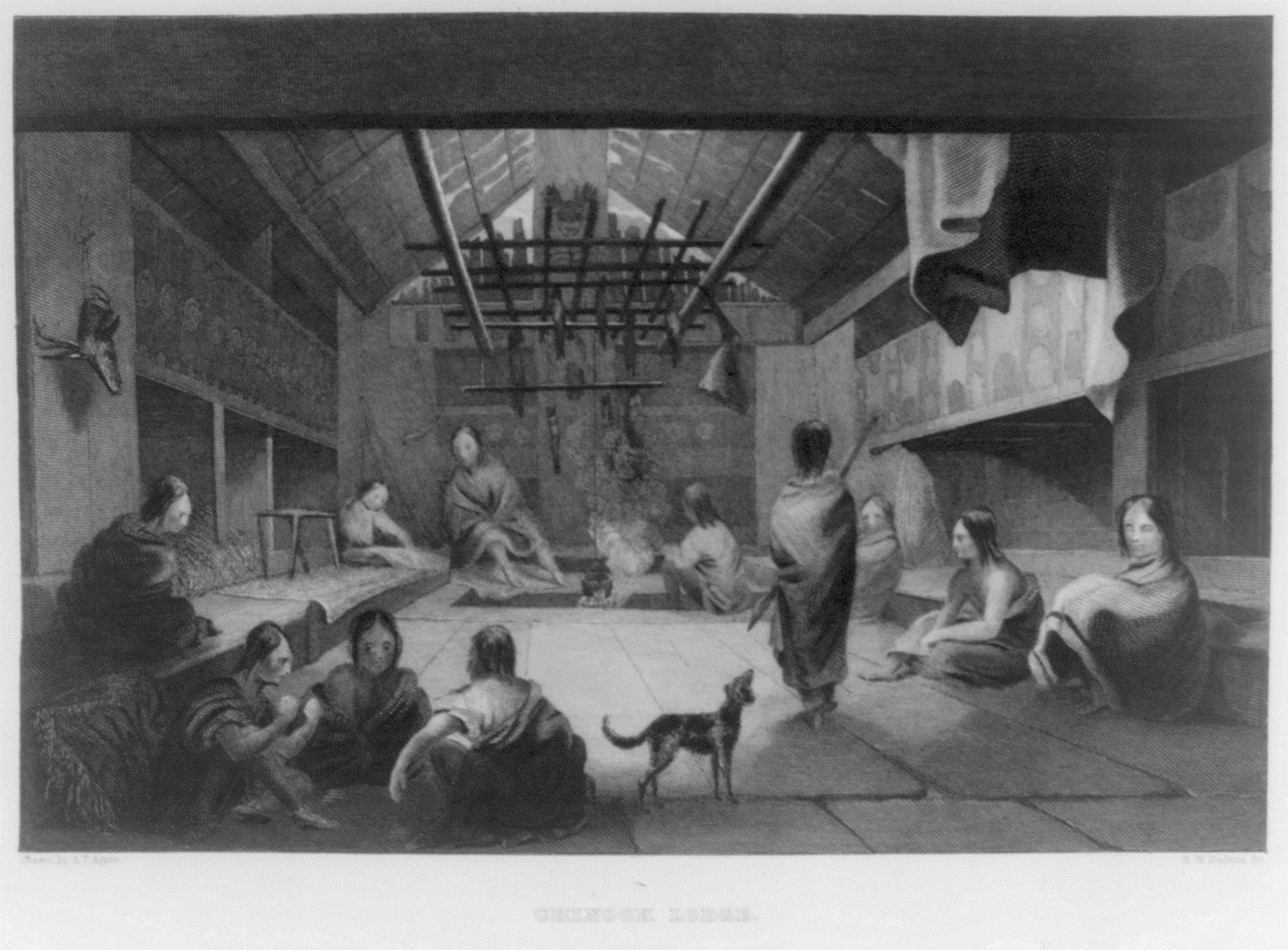
Illustration of the interior of a Chinookan plankhouse

Chinookan-speaking groups include:

=== Lower Chinookans ===
The Lower Chinookans are the related groups who spoke dialects of Lower Chinook, and who had their villages around the mouth of the Columbia River and along the coast:

- Clatsop – On the southern bank of the Columbia, from Point Adams to Youngs Bay, and on the Clatsop Plains south to Tillamook Head.
- Lower Chinook – On the northern bank of the Columbia, from Cape Diasppointment to Grays Bay.
- Shoalwater (Willapa) Chinook – On Willapa Bay

=== Kathlamet (Downstreamers) ===
The Kathlamet/Downstreamers grouping includes several small village groups which all spoke the Kathlamet language:

- Kathlamet – At Cathlamet Head.
- Qaniak – East of Oak Point.
- Skilloot(s) – The exact identity of the Skilloot(s) (or even if they were a tribe at all) is disputed. Theories range from it being a Tillamookan name for the Kalapuyans to a simple miscommunication.
- Wahkiakum – In the vicinity of Pillar Rock.

=== Multnomah (Wapato Valley) ===
This grouping refers to a dense stretch of Upper Chinook-speaking villages between the mouth of the Lewis River to Government Island:

- Cathlapotle – Above the Lewis River
- Multnomah – on Sauvie Island
- Shoto – Recorded by Lewis and Clark, said to live on Lake Vancouver

=== Clackamas ===
The Clackamas were a Kiksht-speaking group that had one village along the Clackamas River:

- Clackamas

=== Willamette Falls ===
- Clawiwalla – On the eastern bank of the Willamette River, opposite Oregon City. Alternatively, linguist Michael Silverstein placed them with the Clackamas.

=== Shakhlatksh/Shahalas (Upstreamers) ===
The "Upstreamers" group refers to village groups and villages in the Cascades region of the Columbia:

- Watlala

=== Wasco-Wishram ===
- Wasco (known also by their Sahaptin name as Wascopam, lived traditionally on the south bank of the Columbia River, Oregon, they were divided into three subtribes: the Dalles Wasco or Wasco proper (near The Dalles in Wasco County), the Hood River Wasco (along the Hood River to its mouth into the Columbia River, sometimes divided into two bands: the Hood River Band in Oregon, and the White Salmon River Band in Washington). In 1822 their population was estimated to be 900, today 200 tribal members out of 4,000 of the Confederated Tribes of Warm Springs are estimated to be Wasco)
- Wishram (a Yakama-Sahaptin term), their autonym as Ita'xluit was the source of transliteration as Tlakluit or Echelut (Echeloot) (lived traditionally on the north bank of the Columbia River, Washington, Wishram village or Nixlúidix ("trading place") near Five Mile Rapids, was the center of the regional trade system for Pacific Coast, Plateau, Great Basin and Plains tribes, in the 1700s, the estimated Wishram population was 1,500. In 1962 only 10 Wishrams were counted on the Washington census, today they are predominantly enrolled in the Confederated Tribes and Bands of the Yakama Nation)
- Chilluckittequaw or Chiluktkwa (living on the north side of Columbia River in Klickitat and Skamania counties, Washington, from about 10 miles (16 km) below the Dalles to the neighborhood of the Cascades. In 1806, Lewis and Clark estimated their number at 2,400. According to Mooney a remnant of the tribe lived near the mouth of White Salmon River until 1880, when they removed to the Cascades, where a few still resided in 1895, today sometimes considered as White Salmon River Band of Washington of the Hood River Wasco subtribe)

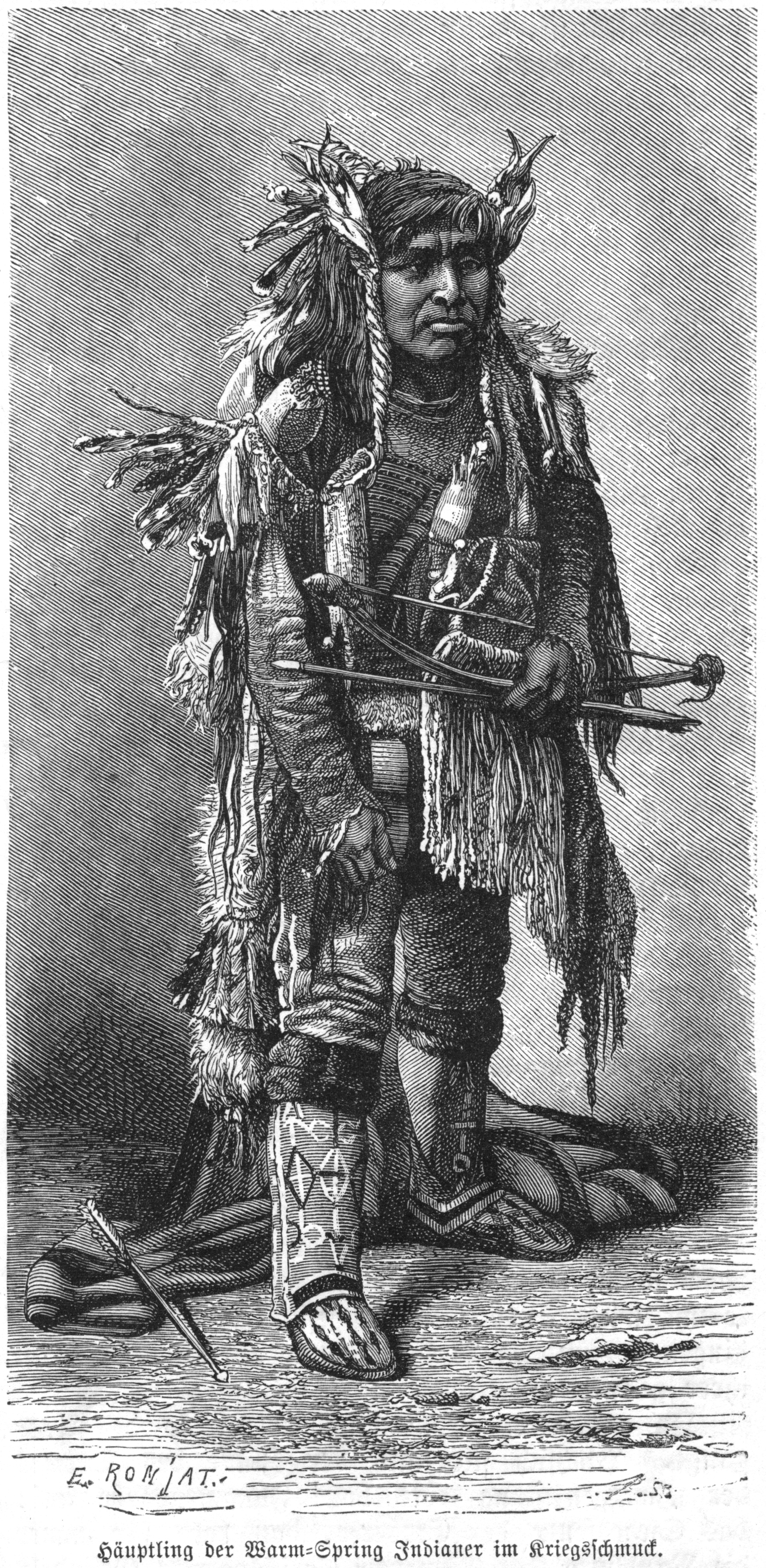
Lower Chinook chief from Warm Spring reservation (1886).

== Notable Chinook ==
- Comcomly, chief in the early to mid-19th century
- Charles Cultee, the principal informant to early 20th-century anthropologist Franz Boas on his language and tribal studies, especially for Chinook Texts.
- Ranald MacDonald, mixed-race son of Archibald McDonald, a Scottish Hudson's Bay Company fur trader, and Raven, Chief Comcomly's daughter, in Astoria, Oregon, was the first Westerner to teach English in Japan, in 1847–1848. He taught Einosuke Moriyama, who served as one of the chief interpreters during negotiations between Commodore Perry and the Tokugawa Shogunate
- J. Christopher Stevens, American diplomat and lawyer who served as the U.S. Ambassador to Libya from June 2012 to September 2012. He was killed when the U.S. consulate was attacked in Benghazi, Libya, on September 11, 2012
- Catherine Troeh, historian, artist, activist and advocate for Native American rights and culture. An elder of the Chinook tribe, she was a direct descendant of Chief Comcomly.
- Chief Tumulth, signed the 1855 treaty that created the Grand Ronde Reservation; he was later killed by General Philip Sheridan's forces
- Tsin-is-tum, "Princess Jennie Michel", a Native American folklorist. Called "Last of the Clatsops."

== See also ==
Drawing of a Chinook dugout canoe from a memoir of the Oregon Country published in 1844

- Chinook salmon
- Chinook (wind)
- Boeing CH-47 Chinook
- Neerchokikoo
