= Nemalquinner =

Former Chinookan settlement in Oregon, United States

- nimáɬx̣ʷinix
- Location within Oregon
- 45°37′18″N 122°47′04″W
- Type: Village
- Cultures: Chinookan peoples
- Location: Portland
- Region: Oregon, United States

Nemalquinner (phonetic: nimáɬx̣ʷinix) was a Native American settlement inhabited by a band of Chinookan peoples on the east bank of the Willamette River near what is now the St. Johns neighborhood of Portland, Oregon in the United States about 2 miles (3.2 km) upstream of where the Willamette River enters the Columbia River. When encountered by the Lewis and Clark Expedition in April 1806, it was reported to have one large longhouse, a few smaller ones, and a population between 100 and 200 people. People dwelling near Willamette Falls upstream would come here to gather wapato roots.

The term Nemalquinner may have also been applied to the inhabitants of this location.

== See also ==
- Multnomah people
