= Clatsop =

Indigenous people in Oregon state

tɬác̓əp
- Tsin-is-tum, a Clatsop elder (c. 1900)

Regions with significant populations
- Coastal Oregon

Languages
- Historically Lower Chinook, later Chinook Jargon and English

Religion
- Indigenous religion

Related ethnic groups
- Other Chinookan peoples, Tillamook people

The Clatsop (Lower Chinook: tɬác̓əp) are a Chinookan-speaking Indigenous people of the Pacific Northwest of the United States. In the early 19th century they inhabited an area of the northwestern coast of present-day Oregon from the mouth of the Columbia River south to Tillamook Head, Oregon. Today, the Clatsop people are members of the federally unrecognized Chinook Indian Nation.

== Etymology ==
The name Clatsop comes from tɬác̓əp, (Note: Also ɬác̓p) meaning "those who have pounded salmon". It was originally the name of a single settlement, later applied to the tribe as a whole.

Clatsop has also been spelled Clapsott, Clapsot, Clotsop, Cladsap, Clatsap, Clatsup, Klatsup, and Latsop.

The Clatsop were also called by the Lower Chinook and Kathlamet tɬák̓ilak, meaning "where there is pounded salmon", deriving from the main Clatsop village, niák̓ilaki.

== Classification ==
The Clatsop are a Chinookan people. Alongside the Willapa Chinook and the Chinook proper, they are one of the Lower Chinook, a cultural-geographical and linguistic grouping of Chinookans whose villages were at the mouth of the Columbia River. The Columbia River in Chinook is called imaɬ or iyagaytɬ imaɬ, 'great water'. In Chinook Jargon, it is called hayásh-tsəqʷ, 'great water'.

== Territory ==
In the 18th and early 19th centuries, the Clatsop occupied an area on the south bank of the Columbia River stretching from Point Adams to Youngs Bay. They also had villages on the Pacific coast stretching from Point Adams to Tillamook Head.

To the north of the Clatsop, across the Columbia River, were the villages of the Chinook, and to the east were the Kathlamet, another Chinookan people. To the south, past Tillamook Head, was the territory of the Nehalem, a Salishan-speaking group to which the Clatsop have strong ties.

List of known Clatsop villages
Name	Anglicization(s)	Location	Notes	References
nakutʼát	Nakutat	In the vicinity of Seaside		
nikánikəm	Necanicum	In the vicinity of Seaside		
niáx̣aqši	Neacoxi, Neahcoxie	In the vicinity of Seaside	The name means "place of little pines"	
niákʼiwanqi	Niyakiwanki	In the vicinity of Seaside		
tɬác̓əp (Note: Also called tiákʼilakix or niák̓ilaki)	Clatsop	Near Point Adams	Main Clatsop village	
kʼunúpi	Kunupi	Near Point Adams		
naiáaqštawi	Naya-akshtawi	Near Point Adams	The name means "at the head"	

== History ==
The Chinookans at the mouth of the river were first mentioned by Robert Gray and his first mate, John Boit, who visited the area on May 18, 1792. Soon after on October 21, the Vancouver expedition visited the area, venturing past the Columbia Bar. The Vancouver expedition described a village at Point Adams, noting the presence of burial canoes.

The first major European account to describe the Clatsop was the account of the Lewis and Clark expedition in 1805. The expedition arrived in the fall and wintered in Youngs Bay. The expedition named their last encampment Fort Clatsop after the tribe, whose nearest major village was approximately 7 miles (11 km) away. According to the journals of William Clark, the Clatsop comprised about 200 people living in three separate villages, with large longhouses constructed of cedar planks. Clatsop members regularly visited the fort to trade furs and other goods for European manufactured goods. The Clatsop shared salmon, berries, and hunting tips with the Corps of Discovery. In contrast to the Corps' interactions with the Plains Indians the previous winter, their interaction with the Clatsop was more limited. The two groups did not mingle for social occasions, and the fort was opened to trading only 24 days during the winter. Part of the reason may have been that the coastal tribes had an existing relationship with British traders. The Clatsop and Chinook asked for higher prices from the American expedition for their goods at a time when the Corps' supply of "Indian gifts" had dwindled. Only two Clatsop, Coboway and Cuscalar, are regularly named in the Corps members' journals.

The arrival of European traders to the Columbia River in the early 19th century allowed the Clatsop and other downriver Chinookans to obtain trade goods otherwise locked behind the long inland trade routes controlled by the upriver Chinookans, their historic rivals.

From the 1830s-1850s, Clatsop society began experiencing a rapid decline after smallpox, measles, malaria, and other diseases ravaged the Columbia River. As the fur trade had become less important to Americans, the Clatsop had to adapt to these quickly changing conditions. Villages were abandoned and populations consolidated together, as tribes began to attempt to negotiate with the American government.

In an 1851 treaty, the Clatsop tribe proposed to cede 90 percent of their land to the U.S. Government. This treaty was one of many in the Northwest that was never ratified by Senate. Unlike other tribes, the members were not required to move to a reservation. They were one of the only tribes in Oregon that were not the focus of an organized effort to remove them from reservations.

By the late 19th century, traditional Clatsop society as it was at the beginning of the century was all but gone. Many Clatsop by this point had merged with their southern neighbors, the Tillamook, and adopted the Tillamook language.

== Culture and society ==
The Clatsop had designated headmen but were socially flexible. Individual families affiliated with one another in small villages and seasonal camps located near food sources.

=== Language ===
The Clatsop spoke a dialect of the Lower Chinookan language, which is now extinct. Most Clatsops spoke Chinook Jargon by the time Lewis and Clark's Corps of Discovery made contact with them. Some spoke Nehalem, reflecting intermarriage and cohabitation with that tribe.

Chinook Jargon is a trade language and was once used throughout much of the Pacific Northwest. Many place names in the area come from the Chinook Jargon, for example, Ecola Creek and Park — "whale".

== Successor groups ==
=== Chinook Indian Nation ===
The Chinook Indian Nation is an unrecognized group which claims descent from the Clatsop people. In January 2001, the Chinook Indian Nation gained official federal recognition through an executive order by President Bill Clinton. The Chinook's legal status was reversed by the Bush administration soon after taking office. The bicentennial of the Lewis and Clark Expedition in 2004–2006 provided renewed interest in the status of the Clatsop and Chinook.

=== Clatsop-Nehalem ===
The Clatsop-Nehalem Confederated Tribes are an unrecognized group who claim descent from the Clatsop people. The Confederated Tribes have approximately 200 members. The confederation formed between the Clatsop and their southern neighbors, the Salishan-speaking Nehalem.

In May 2020, the North Coast Land Conservancy transferred 18.6 acres (7.5 ha) of its Neawanna Point Habitat Preserve, located on the north Oregon coast, to the Clatsop-Nehalem Confederated Tribes. The area, located between Seaside and Gearhart, Oregon, consists of saltmarsh and Sitka spruce forest on the Necanicum Estuary at the north end of Seaside. The Neawanna and the Neacoxie creeks meet the Necanicum River, which flows to the Pacific. The Clatsop had known this area by the name niáx̣̣aqši or "place of little pines". This is the first land owned by the Clatsop-Nehalem Confederated Tribes since they were displaced by European Americans beginning nearly 200 years ago.

=== Others ===
Other tribes in the region, such as the Quinault, Siletz, and Grand Ronde, also have enrollees of Clatsop descent.

== See also ==
- Tsin-is-tum
