= Cathlamet =

Cathlamet may refer to:

- The Kathlamet, a Native American tribe of Oregon and Washington
- Cathlamet, Washington, a city in Washington
- The MV Cathlamet, a ferry vessel operated by Washington State Ferries
- The Kathlamet language spoken by the Kathlamet people
