= Victoria Howard =

Native American storyteller from Oregon c. 1865–1930

- Wishikin
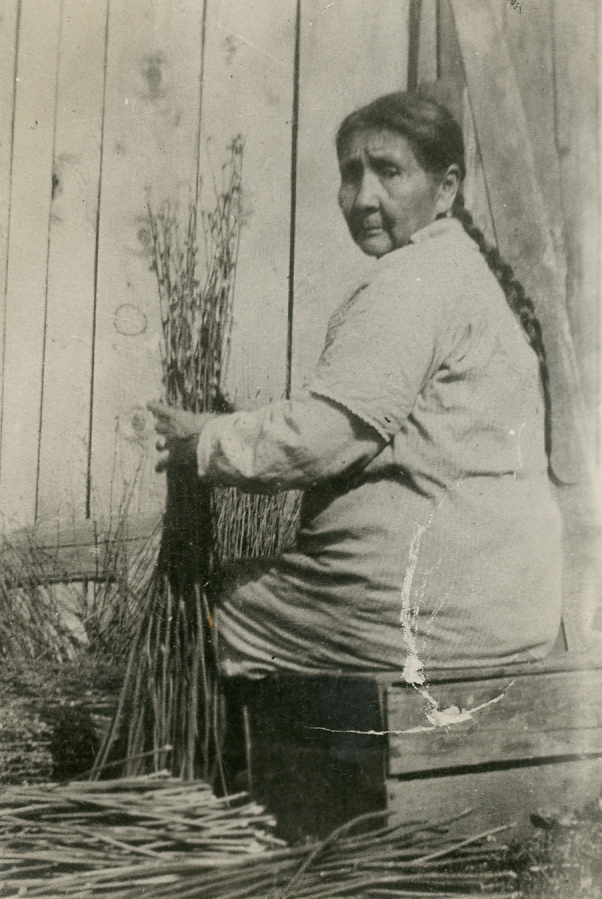
- Howard in 1919
- Born: Victoria Wacheno; September 1865; Grand Ronde Reservation, Oregon
- Died: September 26, 1930 (aged 65); Oregon City, Oregon
- Occupation: storyteller
- Spouse(s): Eustace Howard, West Linn
- Parent(s): Sarah Quiaquaty Wishikin, William Wishikin
- Writing career
- Language: English, Upper Chinook language, Molala language
- Genre: Native American studies

Victoria Howard, also Victoria (Wishikin) Wacheno Howard (c. 1865–1930), was a Clackamas Chinook storyteller from Oregon, USA. She was a Molala, Clackamas, and Tualatin citizen of the Confederated Tribes of the Grand Ronde Community of Oregon.

Howard's songs and stories were dictated, transcribed, and published as Clackamas Chinook Texts. They were used as classroom reading texts for Indigenous school children and are now regarded as a rich record of the Indigenous northwest Oregon storytelling and performance art.

== Early life ==
Location of Grand Ronde Reservation in Oregon

Victoria Wishikin was born circa 1865 on the Grand Ronde Reservation in northwest Oregon, only a decade after the reservation was founded. The Grand Ronde Reservation held a confederation of more than 27 tribes and bands of Indigenous peoples of the Northwest Plateau who had been forcibly moved there by the US government. The tribes from western Oregon, southern Washington state, and northern California were relocated to free up land for incoming white settlers. The multitribal complexity of the reservation resulted in a community that was linguistically and culturally diverse.

Howard was evidence of this, being the daughter of Sarah Quiaquaty Wishikin, herself a daughter of a Molalla tribe chief, and of William Wishikin, a Tualatin (Kalapuyan speaker) who died when his daughter was about ten. Howard gained her knowledge of Clackamas language and culture partly from her maternal grandmother Wagayuhlen Quiaquaty, a Clackamas medical shaman at Grand Ronde with whom she lived after her father's death, and later from her first mother-in-law, Charlotte Wacheno. As a child, she learned basket making and the telling of Clackamas Chinook oral history and myths as well as of Oregon history.

== Adult life ==
In 1928, Howard was approached by Melville Jacobs, a professor of anthropology at the University of Washington state, keen to document the endangered indigenous languages and oral literature of the area. Jacobs had wanted to document the Molalla language, but as Howard was more fluent in Clackamas and spoke English too, Jacobs spent a year with Howard transcribing the Clackamas vocabulary, songs, myths, folktales, and traditional narratives that she dictated to him in the Clackamas language. He also made audio recordings of her extensive repertoire of Indigenous songs. This repertoire of songs and stories together with their study by Jacobs, Dell Hymes, Catharine Mason, and numerous other scholars sometimes working with Indigenous descendants, gives insights into the daily lives and beliefs of Indigenous women while helping to cast light on the changing landscape of Oregon over time.

== Personal life ==
Victoria Wishikin married Marc Dan Wacheno, a son of a Clackamas tribal chief at Grand Ronde, at about fifteen. She had nine children with him, many of whom died before her as a result of the disease and poverty at Grand Ronde. In 1903, at the age of 38, Victoria Wishikin Wacheno married Eustace Howard, a Santiam Kalapuyan from Grand Ronde.

Victoria Howard died on September 26, 1930, possibly as a result of a hit-and-run car accident while walking her grandchildren to church. She left her husband Eustace, their daughter and two granddaughters.

== Legacy ==
Despite the enforced break in the cultural transmission of her people, together with the distress of forced migration, disease, political treachery, and intertribal strife, a record of Howard's creative and artistic expression remains in her songs, poetry, and performances. In a 2021 publication, twenty-five of Howard's spoken-word performances were edited into verse form. The publication also contains original annotations taken from Melville Jacobs' publications of Howard's corpus of songs and stories.

Efforts are also being made by the Confederated Tribes of the Grand Ronde Community and others to keep Chinook Jargon, called Chinuk Wawa at Grand Ronde, alive.

A new dictionary too, distributed by the University of Washington Press, draws for its contents on the legacy of many Chinook speakers and story tellers including Howard.
