= Clackamas people =

Tribe of Native Americans in Oregon, US

Clackamas
gitɬáqʼimaš
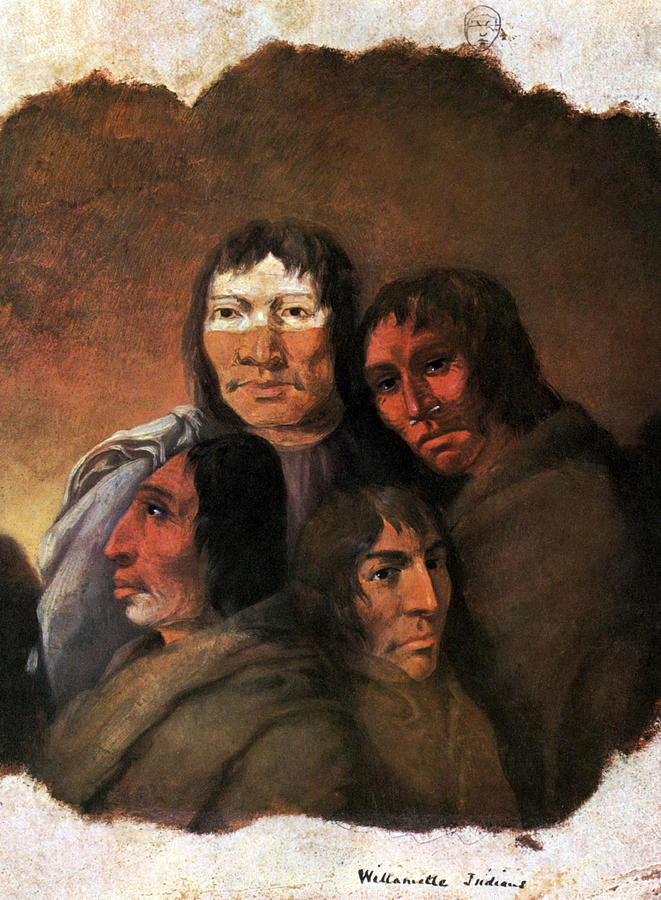
- A drawing of Clackamas Indians by Paul Kane

Regions with significant populations
- Oregon, United States

Languages
- Kiksht (Clackamas dialect)

Related ethnic groups
- other Chinook peoples

The Clackamas Indians (Clackamas: gitɬáqʼimaš) are a band of Chinook Native Americans who historically lived along the Clackamas River in the northern Willamette Valley, Oregon.

Today, Clackamas people are enrolled in the Confederated Tribes of the Grand Ronde Community of Oregon.

In 1806, Lewis and Clark estimated their population to be 1,800. At the time the tribe lived in 12 villages located from the lower Columbia River to an area that is now called Oregon City. They resided towards the east side of the Willamette River. In February 1841, Reverend François Norbert Blanchet and Reverend Alvin F. Waller converted Clackamas Chief Popoh.

The Clackamas signed a treaty in the fall of 1851, which Oregon Superintendent Anson Dart failed to ratify. They signed another treaty on January 10, 1855, which was ratified on March 3, 1855. The Clackamas were promised $2,500 worth of resources, but the United States only paid a fifth of what was owed.

== Lifestyle ==
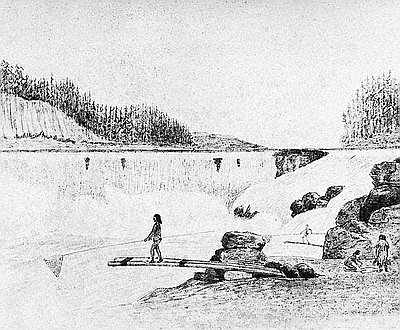
Clackamas and other tribes fished on Willamette Falls.

The tribe subsisted on fish and root vegetables, and constructed large cedar platforms to dip their nets in over Willamette Falls to harvest salmon. The Clackamas women dried and smoked the salmon, which they then combined with mixtures of berries and nuts, preserving it in woven baskets for winter. The Clackamas traded salmon with other tribes, and also harvested and traded wapato, broad-leafed arrowhead or "Indian potato" (Sagittaria latifolia and Sagittaria cuneata).

Adult Clackamas historically wore leather leggings and tunics, and made skirts and bedding from cedar bark. An indication of high status in the tribe was intricate beadwork, quillwork, feather, and shell decorations. Certain shells served as currency.

Like others of the Chinookan peoples, Clackamas practiced head flattening. From infancy, one's head was compressed between boards thus sloping the forehead backward. This was a way to indicate that a person was free rather than a slave.

The Clackamas were expert woodworkers, and crafted canoes and plank lodges. A typical canoe was 20 to 30 feet long, which they used to travel along the rivers, transporting trade goods and people. With deep knowledge of the Clackamas river systems, the Clackamas were often hired by pioneers as guides to navigate the river systems.

== Tomanowos ==
The Willamette Meteorite is culturally significant to Clackamas people. The meteorite is called Tomanowos, which translates to "the visitor of heaven". The meteorite was believed to be given by the Sky People and is the unity between sky, earth, and water. Other tribes around the area thought that the meteorite possessed magical powers.

== History ==
=== 19th century ===
By 1855, the 88 surviving members of the tribe were relocated to Grand Ronde, Oregon, first to the Grand Ronde Indian Reservation. They eventually blended into the general population of the Grand Ronde.

Soosap, likely born in 1841, is considered to be the last full-blooded tribal member. His mother was full-blooded Clackamas, his father was Klickitat. Soosap lived off the Grand Ronde reservation in Oregon City, where he was a day laborer. His English name was Joseph Andrews as non-Native people couldn't pronounce his Native name. He was also a known baseball player in the Pacific Northwest.

== Notable Clackamas ==
- Victoria Wishikin Howard (c. 1865–1930), storyteller

== See also ==
Other Chinookans of the lower Columbia River:

- Cathlamet
- Multnomah
- Neerchokikoo
