= Chinook Indian Nation =

Previously recognized tribe in north-west US

- "Salmon with Spirit Face" tribal logo
- Formation: 1925 (constitution); 2002 (current iteration)
- Legal status: Nonprofit corporation (since 1953); Federally recognized tribe (2001–2002)
- Headquarters: Bay Center, Washington
- Members: 3,123 (2022)
- Tribal chair: Tony Johnson
- Main organ: Council
- Website: chinooknation.org
- Formerly called: Chinook Indian Tribe, Inc. (before 2001); Chinook Indian Tribe/Chinook Nation (2001–2002)

The Chinook Indian Nation is an unrecognized tribe in the U.S. states of Oregon and Washington that was federally recognized from 2001 to 2002. It consists of the five westernmost Chinookan tribes: the Cathlamet, Clatsop, Lower Chinook, Wahkiakum, and Willapa. Its headquarters is in Bay Center, Washington.

The Chinookan people of the Columbia River had a vast trading network before and during European colonization. The trading center of Cathlapotle, established in the 15th century, was visited by the Lewis and Clark Expedition. The governments of the Oregon and Washington Territories negotiated treaties with Chinookans as settlers entered the region. The tribes that would become the Chinook Nation signed the Tansy Point Treaty (1851), which would grant them land, but it was not ratified by Congress. Treaty negotiations at the Chehalis River in 1853 failed. After Chinookans were relocated to the Grand Ronde reservation in 1856, some refused and were not included in negotiations ceding the region to the United States. They began efforts toward recognition as the Chinook Indian Nation, which wrote its constitution in 1925. In the 1920s, the tribe successfully sued to receive allotments of the Quinault Indian Reservation under an 1873 law.

The tribe petitioned for recognition in 1981, under the Federal Acknowledgment Process introduced by the Bureau of Indian Affairs. The Cowlitz Indian Tribe supported their petition, but the Quinault Reservation opposed it. The tribe's federal recognition was signed by Kevin Gover in January 2001, near the end of Bill Clinton's presidency. It was revoked in July 2002 by Neal A. McCaleb, after George W. Bush had taken office, saying that the tribe did not sufficiently document its uninterrupted existence. The Chinook Nation's unsuccessful attempts to regain recognition included a campaign for an act of Congress. A 2023 court ruling overrode a ban on re-applications for recognition and granted the tribe land claim settlement money promised in 1970.

The Chinook Indian Nation is governed by a chair and a nine-member council. Most members live near its traditional lands. The tribe works on efforts for canoe revitalization and language revitalization of Chinook Jargon. The tribe's events include the Winter Gathering and the First Salmon Festival.

== History ==
=== Background ===
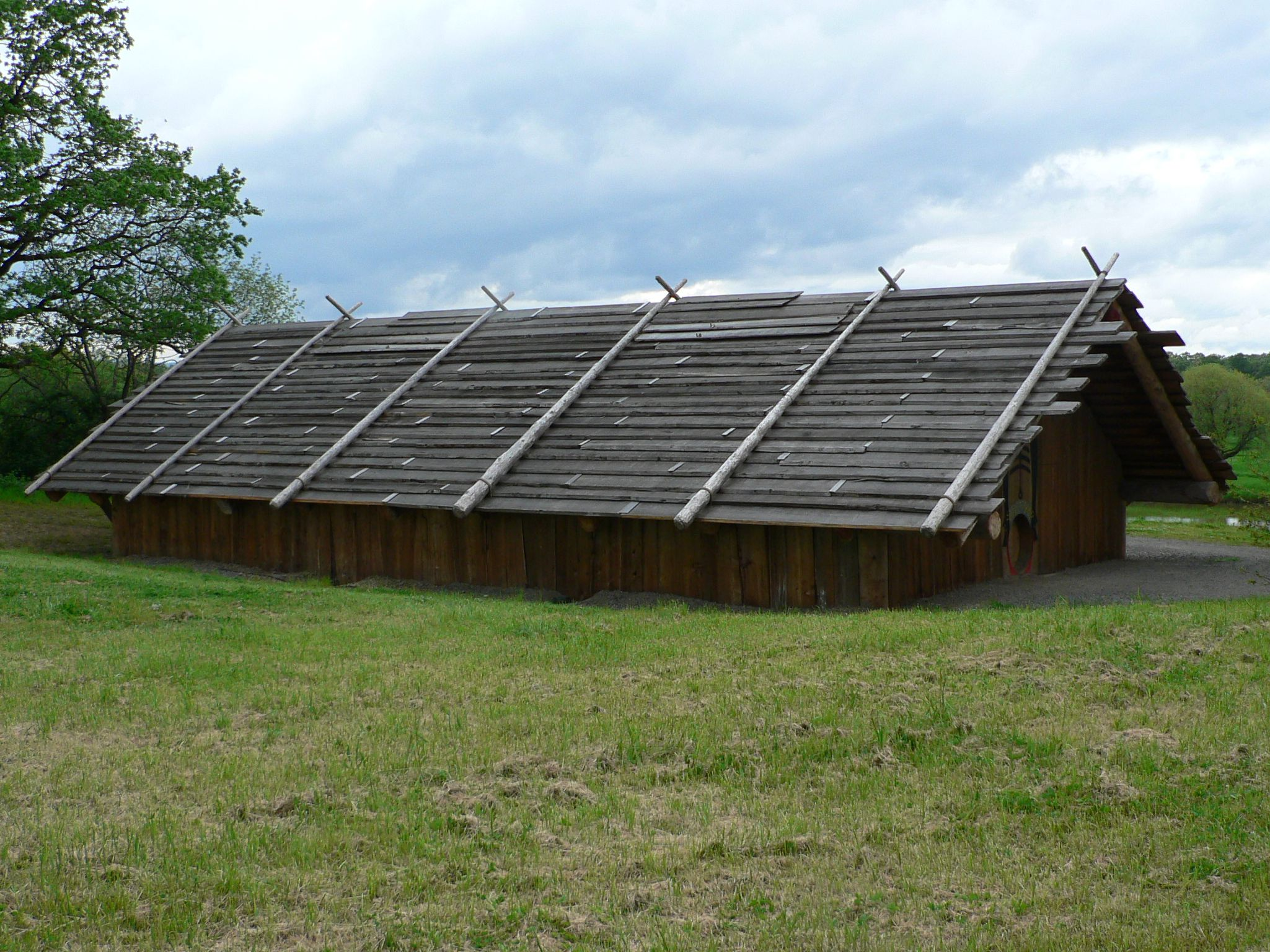
The Cathlapotle Plankhouse, a replica located near the original village of Cathlapotle

The Chinookan peoples historically lived along the Lower Columbia River, from the river's mouth on the Pacific Ocean to the location of modern The Dalles, Oregon. The Lower Chinookans, including the Lower Chinook, Clatsop, and Willapa, lived near the mouth of the river; the Upper Chinookans, including the Cathlamet, lived upstream; and Middle Chinookans lived in a central region containing Willamette Valley. The westernmost Chinookan groups, the Cathlamet, Clatsop, Lower Chinook, Wahkiakum, and Willapa, are the ancestors of the Chinook Indian Nation.

The Chinookans ran a large trading network centered on the Columbia River. The largest unit of government was villages. The village of Cathlapotle, near modern Ridgefield, Washington, was established circa 1450. It became a trading hub one of the largest settlements on the river. The Chinookans first traded with Europeans by May 1792, when American merchant Robert Gray documented a visit to the region. In October of the same year, the Cathlapotle Chinookans met and traded with explorer William Broughton, who worked for George Vancouver. The Lewis and Clark Expedition entered Chinookan land in November 1804 and visited Cathlapotle for two hours on March 29, 1806. They said it had about 900 inhabitants. The expedition was followed by a wave of white settlers. The United States and the British Empire both staked claims to the region; the former established Fort Astoria in 1811, and the latter established Fort Vancouver in 1825.

Once Europeans settled the area, new diseases and the introduction of alcohol led to higher death rates among the Chinook. The Chinookan people faced several smallpox outbreak in the late 18th and 19th centuries and a deadlier malaria epidemic that began in 1830. By 1850, the population of the Middle Chinookan region was the lowest since 1830. Cathlapotle had the highest death rate and was abandoned. As the descendants of the Cathlapotle Chinookans became displaced and mixed with other tribes, multiple groups had connections to them, including the Chinook Indian Nation, though the five tribes had lived downriver from the village.

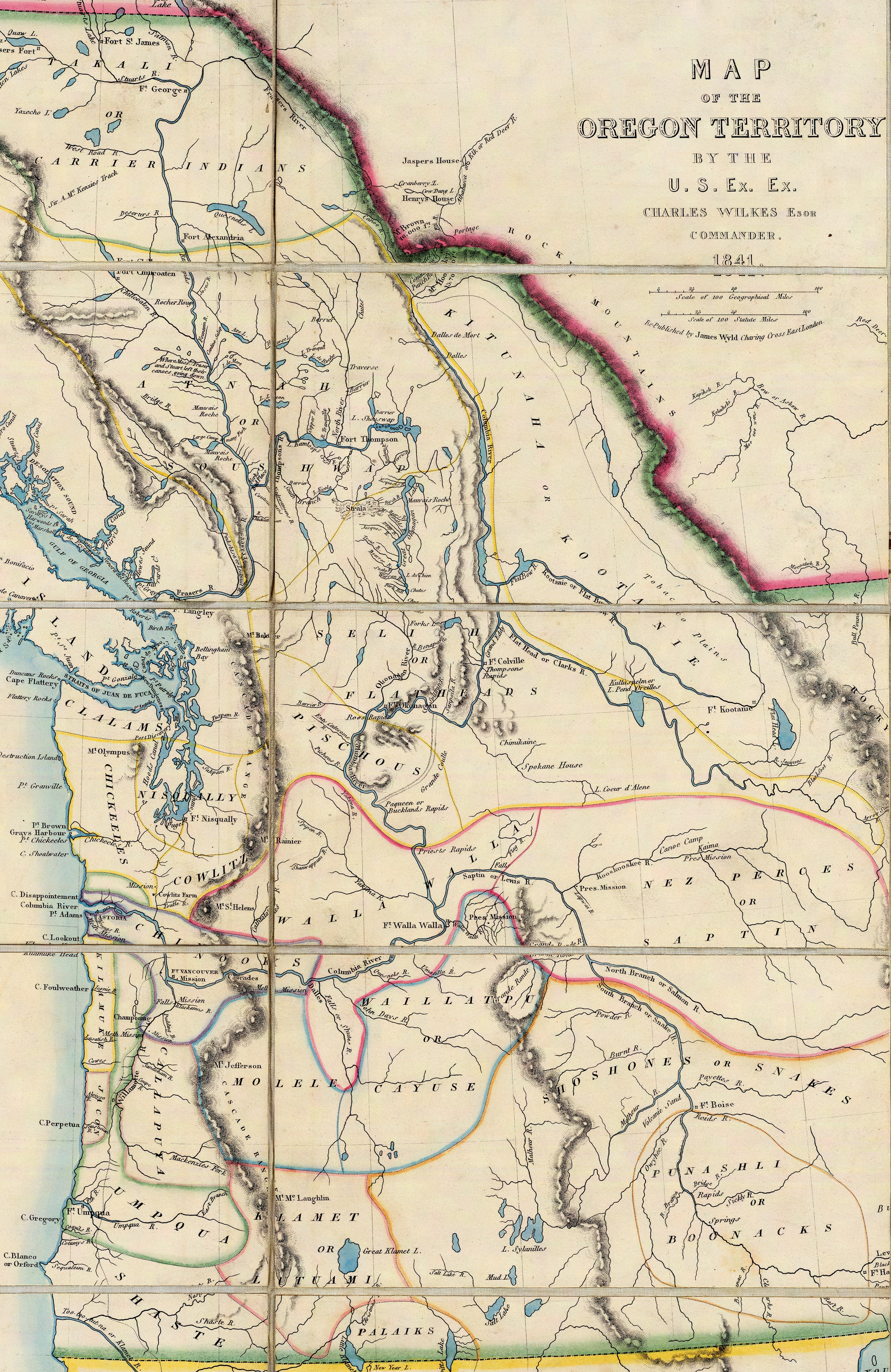
Section of the Wilkes Expedition map of the Oregon Territory, with Chinook land outlined in purple

Chinook was originally the name of a village on the mouth of the Columbia. The first source to use the term Chinook to label a region was a map by ethnologist Horatio Hale from the 1844 Wilkes Expedition. He drew boundaries based on language, which were followed by later maps. Earlier maps, such as Lewis and Clark's, had only labelled villages.

=== Treaty era and failed attempts at recognition (1851–1978) ===
After the establishment of the Oregon Territory, the government was required to negotiate land with local tribes. The Donation Land Act of 1850 established a treaty process, though some settlers had already been present. The Oregon Superintendent of Indian Affairs, Anson Dart, began negotiations with Middle Chinookans with the goal of evicting them, but failed.

The Tansy Point Treaty of August 1851 was negotiated between Dart and seven groups of Lower Chinookans. The final treaty, signed by Chinook leader Huckswelt, would grant the Chinookans land in the region, the right to hunt and gather within the region, services from the Office of Indian Affairs, and compensation for relinquished land. The treaty was received by Congress in November. It was not signed due to opposition from Oregon delegates Joseph Lane and Samuel Thurston, so Chinookans lost land to settlers without legal recourse. Tansy Point was the only meeting of all five ancestral tribes of the Chinook Nation.

The Washington Territory was formed in 1853 with Territorial Governor Isaac Stevens. He negotiated a treaty in 1855 at the Chehalis River with 350 representatives of groups including the Chinook. Stevens planned on moving the tribes to a reservation spanning from Grays Harbor to Cape Flattery. The Chinook and the Cowlitz refused to sign it as Stevens's proposal would require them to relocate and live with the unfamiliar Quinault people. Their rejection was motivated by anger at the result of the Tansy Point Treaty. Stevens got angry and refused further discussions.

Dart was succeeded in 1853 by Joel Palmer, who continued his goal of evicting Middle Chinookans. After the tribes refused to move to the east of the Cascade Mountains, Palmer planned a reservation at Grand Ronde in Western Oregon. The 1855 Willamette Valley Treaty ceded the region to the United States. In 1856, Palmer required all Middle Chinookans to move to Grand Ronde in order to appease settlers. Some refused to join and stayed in the region, where they lacked representation and often married into other tribes. The Chinook Indian Nation was formed from those who stayed near the Columbia River.

The United States annexed most of the region in 1855 and 1856 through a series of treaties, including the Treaty of Olympia, which established the Quinault Indian Reservation. The Chinook were not involved in these treaties. The Shoalwater Bay Reservation was created in 1861 for some Chinook and Lower Chehalis people. However, legislation of the era only addressed a small segment of Chinook people or required them to move farther than they wanted. The nation began pursuing legal representation in 1899. Efforts to receive recognition continued to fail.

The five tribes were included in the 1906 McChesney Rolls, a U.S. government census of Pacific Northwest tribes. Many of the tribe's children were sent to the American Indian boarding schools of Chemawa and Puyallup, where they were forced to assimilate to White culture. The Chinook Tribe wrote its constitution in 1925. It is one of the region's oldest tribal constitutions. The nation continued to advocate for recognition by holding monthly council meetings and by maintaining enrollment lists, which began in 1926.

Under an 1873 executive order by Ulysses S. Grant, allotments of the Quinault Indian Reservation were granted to "fish-eating Indians", which included the Chinook. The Chinooks sued to receive allotments in 1926 and won the 1928 court case Halbert v. United States, which was upheld in 1931 by the Ninth Circuit Court. They received their first allotment in 1933.

The State of Washington gave the Chinook Nation the status of nonprofit corporation in 1953. In 1956, the tribe's chairman, J. Grant Elliott, wrote to oppose the construction of the Pelton Dam on the Warm Springs Indian Reservation as he believed it would hinder access to fish for Chinook fishers. In the 1970s, the Chinook lost their fishing rights after a federal court limited these rights to recognized tribes. The Indian Claims Commission ruled in 1958 that the Chinook Nation was the successor of the Lower Chinook and Clatsop people. In the Docket 234 decision on November 4, 1970, it awarded the tribe $48,692.05 for the land it lost in 1851. The money was placed in a trust without an agreement about how to distribute it.

=== Federal recognition process and reversal (1978–2002) ===
After the Bureau of Indian Affairs (BIA) introduced the Federal Acknowledgment Process (FAP) in 1978, the Chinook Indian Nation began work on filing for recognition. It began its petition in 1981. The tribe's federal recognition effort occurred at the same time as that of the Cowlitz Indian Tribe, which supported its effort. Both tribes consulted historian Stephen Dow Beckham and attorney Dennis Whittlesey. The Quinault Reservation opposed the Chinook effort. It had a rivalry with the Chinook Nation as Chinook people owned a majority of land on the reservation.

The Chinook's petition passed and was signed on January 3, 2001, one of the final days of the presidency of Bill Clinton, by the Assistant Secretary of the Interior for Indian Affairs, Kevin Gover. The decision excluded "those members of the petitioning group whose Indian descent is exclusively from the historical Clatsop Tribe" on the grounds that the Clatsop had lost official status under the Western Oregon Indian Termination Act and that they had joined the nation later than the other subgroups.

A memo within the BIA raised doubts about the validity of the case on the same day as the decision. Eighty-nine days later, the Quinault filed a claim to the Interior Board of Indian Appeals that the Chinook did not meet the requirements of the FAP. The board decided on August 1 that this claim did not meet the burden of proof and affirmed the original decision. However, it said that part of the case was outside of its jurisdiction. Neal A. McCaleb, Gover's successor under George W. Bush, received the case. On July 5, 2002, he revoked the recognition on the grounds that the tribe failed three of the seven FAP criteria:

The petitioner failed to meet criteria (a), (b), and (c) of the acknowledgment regulations—failing to demonstrate that it has maintained political influence over its members from historical times to the present [criterion (c)], that a predominant portion of its members comprise a distinct social community at present, or since 1950 [criterion (b)], or that it has been identified historically as an Indian entity by outside observers on a substantially continuous basis [criterion (a)].

The decision said that the tribe lacked documentation between the 1850s and 1920s. Tribal chair Gary Johnson argued that the decision was arbitrary and that the tribe had almost 19,000 pages of documentation, equal to most recognized tribes. He said, "The government worked against Chinook all of these years and how can you expect us to have this perfect—and I guess I would use the term 'white man's government'—with paper trails over all this period of time. It ends up that people that are three thousand miles away are making decisions about us without even spending much time with us."

=== Attempts at re-recognition (2002–present) ===
The site of Cathlapotle fell within Ridgefield National Wildlife Refuge, run by the United States Fish and Wildlife Service (USFWS). A team of Portland State University (PSU) archaeologists led by Kenneth Ames confirmed its location in the 1990s. The team contacted tribes with connections to the land, as required by the National Historic Preservation Act. The Chinook was the only one of the four tribes they contacted that wanted an active role in the project; the Cowlitz and Yakama were uninterested and Grand Ronde deferred to the Chinook. After the Cowlitz gained federal recognition in 2003, they contacted USFWS to dispute the Chinook claim to Cathlapotle. They argued that the Cowlitz had lived in the area more recently, and that identity of the Cathlapotle Chinookans was uncertain. The recently formed Clatsop-Nehalem Confederated Tribes, which had split from the Chinook Nation, made another claim. USFWS held that the Chinook Nation was the main representative of Cathlapotle. It agreed to include the Cowlitz in discussions about the area and to avoid referring to the people of Cathlapotle as Chinook.

The tribe and the USFWS built a reproduction of a plankhouse as an attraction for visitors. The Cathlapotle Plankhouse opened on March 29, 2005, ahead of a bicentennial celebration of the Lewis and Clark expedition. The Chinook Nation was hesitant about participating in the bicentennial as it focused on outsiders, and they were unhappy about the inclusion of the Clatsop-Nehalem Confederated Tribes. The tribe decided to participate because the event would bring it visibility. William Clark's descendants donated a canoe to the tribe as a repayment for one stolen by Lewis and Clark. The celebration included the Confluence Project, a collaborative project between artists, civic groups, and tribes from the Pacific Northwest, with six art installations designed in part by Maya Lin.

The Chinook Nation decided to seek recognition through an act of Congress, which would be less costly and risky than suing the federal government. Representative Brian Baird of Washington's 3rd congressional district, who had attended the signing of the 2001 decision, joined this effort. He introduced H.R. 6689, "A Bill to Restore Federal Recognition to the Chinook Nation, and for Other Purposes", to the 110th Congress in July 2008. The bill mentioned the Chinook's role in the Lewis and Clark expedition, the Tansy Point and Chehalis treaties, and the inclusion of four of the constituent tribes in the Western Oregon Termination Act. It provided for non-commercial hunting and fishing rights. The bill was sent to the Committee on Natural Resources and died down. Baird reintroduced it as H.R. 2576 in May 2009 and H.R. 3084 the following month. Baird, along with tribal councilor Phil Hawks, testified to the committee on July 15, but the bill failed again amid debates about the federal recognition process.

The administration of Barack Obama revised the FAP, which it called "broken", and eased rules on documentation by outsiders. After Baird retired, the tribe met with Congress members Jaime Herrera Beutler, Maria Cantwell, and Doc Hastings, who all suggested that the tribe reapply under the new FAP. However, this revision said that tribes whose petitions have been denied are banned from petitioning again.

By 2010, the Chinook Nation had over 2,000 members. Tony Johnson succeeded his father Gary Johnson as tribal chair in 2013. In June 2015, the Chinook Nation launched the Chinook Executive Justice Recognition Project, directed toward Obama. Their goals were for Obama to recognize the nation via an executive order, to enact the Tansy Point Treaty, and to negotiate land for the Chinook. The project included a daily letter campaign to Obama, Clinton, and media outlets. The letters covered various Chinook-related topics and served as documentation of the culture. In August 2022, it launched a campaign targeted at Washington's senators, Patty Murray and Maria Cantwell.

The Chinook Nation sued the Department of the Interior in August 2017 on eight claims. The department moved to dismiss the case. District judge Ronald B. Leighton denied the tribe's claim that a federal court could grant recognition. The remaining claims included a challenge to the rule against re-petitioning and an argument that the department must give the tribe compensation for Docket 234. The ruling of Chinook Indian Nation v. Bernhardt sided with the former claim, arguing that the BIA's ban on reapplications was unreasonable and beyond the power of the bureau. The bureau reviewed the rule. The tribe continued to make the claim that courts had the power to grant recognition, citing a unique interpretation of the Federally Recognized Indian Tribe List Act of 1994. Courts ruled in 2023 that the tribe was entitled the land claims trust. The decision voided the BIA's 2011 suspension of trust fund distributions due to the status of the tribe. Secretary of the Interior Deb Haaland and Congress approved distribution of the money. The trust was then worth $686,180. The tribe was unrestricted in its use of the money.

The tribe worked with state and federal agencies, but its status prevented it from protecting land. It purchased land near Astoria, Oregon with funding from donors including the Oregon Community Foundation, the Meyer Memorial Trust, and the Collins Foundation. The land included a Chinookan village and a gathering place where the Tansy Point Treaty had been signed. In November 2024, the tribe entered an agreement with the Columbia Land Trust to jointly care for land owned by the trust. After Marie Gluesenkamp Perez became the representative of Washington's 3rd congressional district in 2022,, she began working with the tribe on a bill to grant recognition. In June 2024, the month she was expected to introduce the Chinook Indian Nation Restoration Act, she faced a dispute with the tribe over a revision to the bill that would remove the tribe's natural resource rights. She stated that her goal was to write a bill that would be supported by Congress, as well as to have the backing of other tribes and businesses in the area. The tribe refused the proposed bill in April 2025; Johnson said in a press release, "Congresswoman Gluesenkamp Perez gave the Chinook Indian Nation an impossible choice: give up our rights to live as we have done for tens of thousands of years, or maintain our status as an 'unrecognized' tribe."

On March 9, 2026, the Washington State Senate passed Resolution 8690, formally acknowledging the Chinook Indian Nation's historical and continued presence along the land spanning the lower Columbia River and the Pacific coast of southwest Washington and northwest Oregon. The bill "recognizes the importance of the Chinook Tribal Nation in the development of [the] region, and its present day contribution to the civic, cultural, and economic life of the state of Washington." Resolution 8690 is a bipartisan bill, sponsored by Senator Jeff Wilson, a Republican politician representing Washington's 19th legislative district.

== Administration and membership ==
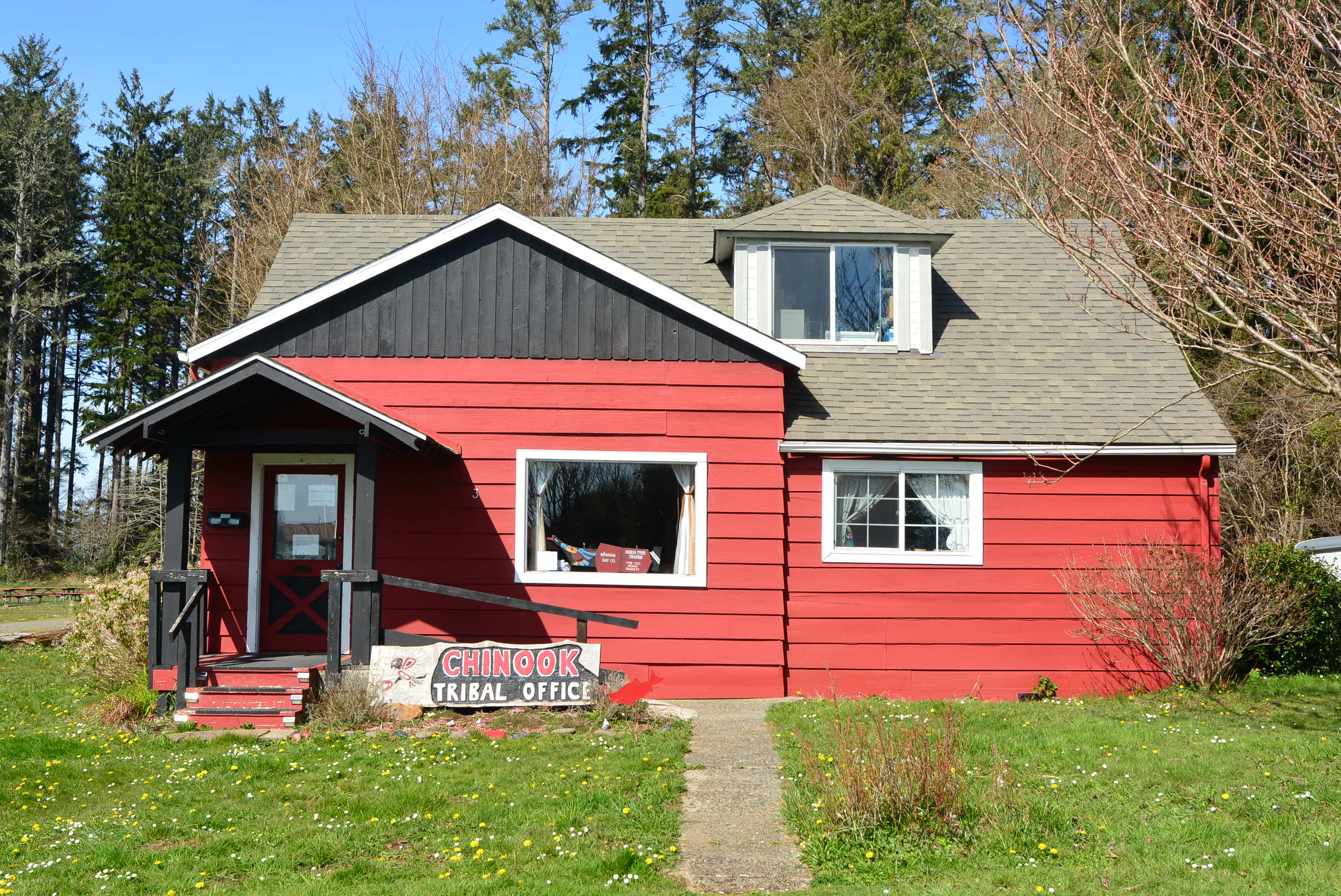
The Chinook Tribal Office in Bay Center, Washington

The Chinook Indian Nation is based in Bay Center, Washington. It is governed by an elected tribal chair and a council with nine members. It has committees on communications, culture, enrollment, fisheries, fund development, health and social services, lands, and scholarship. The tribe's land claim spans from the Pacific Ocean to around Oak Point, Washington in the east. Most citizens live near the tribes' historical homeland in the counties of Pacific and Wahkiakum in Washington and Clatsop and Columbia in Oregon. The tribal council discouraged tribal disenrollment in 2016.

The tribe has 3,123 citizens, as of 2022. Citizens are descended from the Lower Chinook, Clatsop, Willapa, Wahkiakum, and Cathlamet tribes, as listed in the tribe's constitution. The Chinook Indian Nation includes one of the largest populations with Clatsop ancestry. The organization owns less than five acres of land, donated by members, as of 2017.

According to tribal chair Tony Johnson, the Chinook Nation's unrecognized status has hindered "economic development, the establishment of a land base, the preservation of our culture, the reinstatement of fishing and hunting rights, the ability to repatriate our ancestors’ bones and sacred items from museum collections, and the ability to better care for our community's health and well-being." The tribe's lack of funding led to the closure of its food bank in November 2011, and it could barely cover the cost of its tribal office as of 2017. Senate Bill 5433 of the Washington State Senate required schools to "incorporate curricula about... the nearest federally recognized Indian tribe or tribes", which excluded the unrecognized Chinook Nation. As it is not covered by the Native American Graves Protection and Repatriation Act, the tribe has been unable to protect burial sites such as the Ero Boldt Cemetery, destroyed by a private landowner, and another site accidentally damaged by utility workers. The Chinook have been ineligible for federal funding, such as a relief package during the COVID-19 pandemic. As it did not receive COVID-19 supplies, members had to get vaccines from neighboring tribes. However, citizens are eligible for Individual Indian Money accounts from the federal Department of the Interior.

== Culture and activities ==
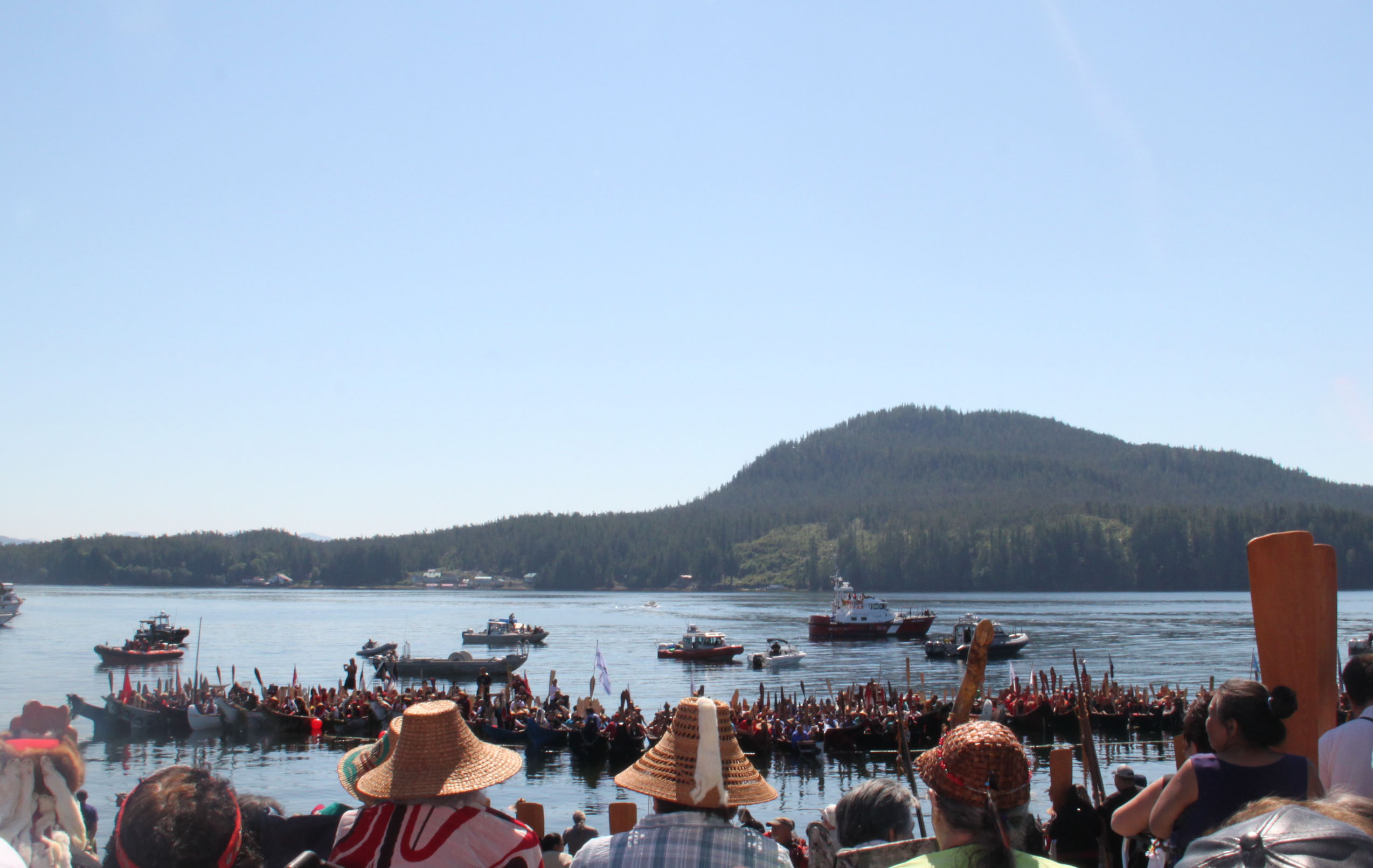
Tribal Canoe Journeys 2014

The Chinook Indian Nation participates in efforts to revive the canoe tradition. The tribe considers canoes a vital aspect of its culture. The revitalization has led to canoes being part of everyday activities as well as events and ceremonies. The most famous canoe revitalization event is the Tribal Canoe Journeys, an annual gathering of indigenous peoples of the Pacific Northwest. Though members of the Chinook Nation had worked with the event since its creation in 1989, the nation began participating in Tribal Journeys in 2005, along with the Confederated Tribes of Grand Ronde. The two tribes combined their resources and began jointly participating in the event. As both tribes increased their presence at the event, they began participating separately, though they continued collaborating. Tribal Journeys has helped combat drug abuse among the Chinook as an intervention method based on the culture's values, unlike common methods that were not designed for Native Americans.

Chinook Jargon is a heritage language of the Chinook Indian Nation. The organization works on language revitalization using informal methods, unlike more formal initiatives by Grand Ronde, which has more resources as an official tribe. The two tribes began collaborating on language revitalization in the late 1990s. Members of the tribe also speak Chinookan languages. The annual First Salmon Ceremony celebrates the first salmon catch of the year. The Cathlapotle Plankhouse is a cultural center that holds educational events. It was built by volunteers and is located in the Ridgefield National Wildlife Refuge, near the site of Cathlapotle. The tribe uses the plankhouse for events such as the Winter Gathering, a meeting of tribes.

== Notable people ==
- Roger F. Nyhus - U.S. ambassador to Barbados and the Eastern Caribbean
- J. Christopher Stevens - U.S. ambassador to Libya, killed in the 2012 Benghazi attack
