= Catherine Troeh =

American historian, artist, activist and advocate

Catherine Herrold Troeh (January 5, 1911 – June 28, 2007) was an American historian, artist, activist and advocate for Native American rights and culture, especially in the Pacific Northwest. She was a member and elder of the Chinook tribe and a direct descendant of the great chief, or tyee, of the Chinook people, Comcomly.

== Early life ==
Troeh was born in Ilwaco, Pacific County, Washington, 24 minutes after her identical twin sister, Charlotte. Both sisters went on to attend school at St. Vincent's Hospital in Portland, Oregon, sometime around the year 1933. Catherine Troeh later enrolled at the University of Washington and received a bachelor's degree in public health.

Troeh worked as a nurse for several Seattle area hospitals and for the Seattle Health Department. She also opened and owned an antique store in Burien, Washington.

== Activism ==
Troeh was an active member of the Chinook Indian Tribe. She was the only woman to join the newly formed Chinook Tribal Council in 1952. She wrote a Native American-focused newsletter, which was distributed at least once a month during her lifetime.

Troeh was a major advocate for federal recognition of her Chinook tribe. In addition, she worked closely with Washington's Duwamish tribe. She attended the opening and celebration of the Duwamish's new tribal cultural center and longhouse on June 23, 2007, just days before her death.

Troeh collaborated with a number of important Native American activists in Washington, including her older sister, Betsy Trick, Pearl Warren, and University of Washington anthropology professor Erna Gunther. Together the women founded an organization called the American Indian Women's Service League (AIWSL) in 1958. The American Indian Women's Service League was created in response to a growing trend of Native Americans moving from reservations and to large cities beginning in the 1950s. The main purpose of the league was to help counsel newly arrived Native Americans on the cultural differences and new challenges of modern American urban life that were not faced in their reservations.

The AIWSL gradually evolved into several other Native American organizations, including the Seattle Indian Health Board, the United Indians of All Tribes, and the Seattle Indian Center. Troeh served on the board of the Seattle Indian Center until her death.

In addition to her work as an activist, Troeh was a strong promoter of Native American culture. She collected Native American artifacts. Troeh often signed her letters "member of the Chinook Tribe Allottee 1865 Quinault reservation." Her unusual way of signing letters referred to the 80 acres (32 ha) which were granted to her by the U.S. federal government.

== Death ==
In 2007, Troeh died in Burien, Washington at the age of 96.
