= Neerchokikoo =

Indian village near Portland, Oregon

- Native American
- Location within Oregon Location within the United States
- Coordinates: 45.570643°N 122.609192°W

Area
  - Total: 4 ha (9.9 acres)
- Time zone: Pacific
- Area code: 503
- Website: nayapdx.org

Neerchokikoo is a revitalized Native American village in the Cully neighborhood of Portland, Oregon. Neerchokikoo is culturally significant, is an ancient Native encampment in what is now Northeast Portland, and is a gathering site close to the confluence of the Columbia and Willamette Rivers.

== History ==
Near the Columbia River, the Columbia Slough watershed is the traditional homelands of peoples of the Upper Chinook. Of the Clackamas, Cascade, and Multnomah bands of Chinook and the Tualatin band of the Kalapuya, the area is on traditional village sites. They and many others are a part of the region and community today.

Since before being mentioned in Lewis and Clark's journals, Native people gathered there for community building and trade, but the land was taken from them during colonization. As of summer 2023, 10 acres (4.0 hectares) was returned to the Natives. The Native American Youth and Family Center's community center, gardens, and offices are there, and the goal is to create a permanent home for the urban Native community. The plan is for this home to reflect the land's history.

The "Return to Neerchokikoo" campaign cost $4.6 million. It raised funds for upgrades that were much needed, for property repairs, and addressed the mortgage debt. Grants and donors were helpful in giving money, to revitalize the site.

== Community and culture ==
The Native American Youth and Family Center, a 501(c)3 non-profit, relocated to Neerchokikoo in 2006. The organization offers services to the Native community of Portland.

The annual powwow is named for the village of Neerchokikoo.

== See also ==
- Kathlamet
- Molala
- Native American peoples of Oregon
- Oregon Community Foundation
- Whitaker Ponds Nature Park

== External links and references ==
- Neerchokikoo's homepage
- Naya Family Center on their annual Powwow
- Learn more about Portland's vital Native American community
- Powwow returns, celebrates NAYA’s Land Back achievement
- A YouTube walk-through
- A YouTube, Neerchokikoo Powwow 9/16/2023 Portland, Oregon
