= Lower Chinook =

Extinct Chinookan language

- Tsinúk
- Native to: United States
- Region: Columbia River Valley
- Ethnicity: 140 lower Chinook (2000 census)
- Extinct: 1930s
- Language family: Chinookan: Lower Chinook

Language codes
- ISO 639-3: chh
- Glottolog: chin1286

Lower Chinook is an extinct Chinookan language historically spoken at the mouth of the Columbia River on the west coast of North America.

== Dialects ==
- Clatsop (Tlatsop) was spoken in northwestern Oregon around the mouth of the Columbia River and the Clatsop Plains (†).
- Shoalwater (also known as Chinook proper), extinct (†) since the 1930s. Shoalwater was spoken in southwestern Washington around southern Willapa Bay.

Chinook Jargon is partially based on Chinook.

== Comparison to Kathlamet and Upper Chinook ==
Lower Chinook shares many cognates with the Upper Chinook and Kathlamet languages.

English	Lower Chinook	Kathlamet	Upper Chinook
One	Ixt	Ixat	Ixt
Two	Môkst	Môkct	Môkčt
Three	Łun	Łon	Łun
Four	Lakt	Lakt	Lakt
Five	Kwanm	Quinum	Gwεnεm
Man	Łkwalipx	Lxam	Ikala
Woman	Ła'akil	Aqakilak	Agagilak
Sun	O'ołax	Aqałax	Agałax
Moon	Okłumin	Akłemin	Akulmin
Water	Łtsuq	Łtcuqoa	Iłčqoa
