= Multnomah people =

Tribe of Native Americans near Portland, Oregon

The Multnomah are a tribe of Chinookan people who live in the area of Portland, Oregon, in the United States. Multnomah villages were located throughout the Portland basin and on both sides of the Columbia River. The Multnomah speak a dialect of the Upper Chinookan language in the Oregon Penutian family.

== History ==
The Multnomah people are a band of the Chinookan peoples who originally resided on and near Sauvie Island in Oregon. The Multnomah and the related Clackamas tribes lived in a series of villages along the river near the mouth of the Willamette River on the Columbia River (the Willamette was also called the "Multnomah" in the early 19th century). According to archaeologists, the villages in the area were home to approximately 3,400 people year-round, and as many as 8,000 during fishing and wappato-harvesting seasons (wappato is a marsh-grown plant like a potato or onion and a staple food).

In 1830, a disease generally thought to have been malaria devastated the Multnomah villages. Within five years, the village of Cathlapotle was abandoned and was briefly inhabited by the Cowlitz tribe. The Multnomah people had nearly been wiped out by the year 1834 due to malaria and smallpox outbreaks. With only a few Multnomah left by the year 1910, the remaining people were transferred to the Grand Ronde Community which is also located in the Northwest of Oregon.

=== Location ===
In 1854 Multnomah County became an official part of Oregon. The Multnomah people were located in today's Multnomah County, but more specifically, they inhabited Sauvie Island on the Columbia River. The Native American term for Sauvie Island was Wappatoo Island. The Multnomah people shared Sauvie Island with other Chinook tribes under the collective name The Cathlascans. Furthermore, the Multnomah people were considered “upper Chinook” and spoke the Wasco-wishram language.

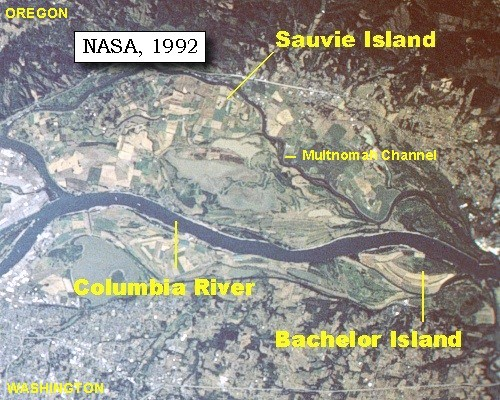
An overview of the Columbia River and Sauvie Island

One of the larger villages, Cathlapotle, was located in present-day Clark County, Washington at the confluence of the Lewis River with the Columbia River and was visited by the Lewis and Clark Expedition in 1805. According to their journals, Lewis and Clark found 14 houses in the village, most of them ranging from 14-by-20 ft (4.3 m by 6.0 m) to about 40-by-100 ft (12 m by 30 m). They reported that approximately 900 people lived in the villages. The Cathlacomatup were a group of Multnomah that resided along the Multnomah Channel at the Wappatoo Inlet. Lewis and Clark came into contact with the Cathalacomatup in 1805.

=== Chief Multnomah ===
The existence of the great chief named Multnomah has been up for debate. Other Native American tribes in the Columbia River Valley area spoke of him in their oral history. These accounts were recorded in newspapers and journals from the early stages of colonization. The Oregon Historical Society had multiple presidents throughout the 1900s who dismissed him as a mere myth.

Multnomah was the chief of tribes ranging across much of the Pacific Northwest from Oregon to Canada, and, during his 40 years of power, he was chief of the Willamettes, as well as war chief of the tribes and communities of Wauna, Oregon, ruling from his station on what is known today as Sauvie Island.

Ann Fulton, a history professor at Portland State University, found and collected much of what is known of Chief Multnomah from many written stories. She documented this in her paper The Restoration of an Iłkák'mana: A Chief Called Multnomah. She hoped to bring more awareness to his existence. Particular accounts came from people such as William Tappan and Dr. Elijah White, both agents of Indian tribes. The many verbal and written accounts of Chief Multnomah were similar. He was regarded highly, and many stated that while he was a warrior chief, he was very respected among his people.

It is believed that the end of Chief Multnomah's reign occurred with the eruption of Mount Hood during the 1780s. In 1792, Captain George Vancouver and his crew did not encounter Chief Multnomah along their expedition, according to their records, however, later in 1805 when Lewis and Clark reached Sauvie Island they wrote of the “mulknomah” people. This referenced Chief Multnomah, as well as the group of tribes that made up his people.

== Culture ==
The houses of the Multnomah, like the other Chinookan peoples, were largely longhouses made of Western Redcedar planks. The size of a home depended on the wealth of the owner, with the larger houses furnishing living quarters for up to 100 people. Within each house, a particular family had a separate cubicle separated by woven mats. Each family had its own fire, with the families also sharing a communal central fire in the household.

The Multnomah diet included salmon, eels, sturgeon, elk, water birds, and especially wapato. Wapato is a wild tuber that grew in particular abundance in the area.

== Legends ==
=== Land and name claim ===
In one legend described in Jeanne Eder's The Bridge of Gods, the name for the Multnomah people came from a dispute between two brothers.

According to Eder's version of the story, the Great Spirit, who maintained no physical form, took care of the world's people. Although everyone was content, the two brothers were not satisfied. The Great Spirit brought the siblings to the top of a mountain that overlooked their land. He told the brothers to shoot an arrow in opposite directions, and the Great Spirit allowed each brother to claim their land and chief hood based on where their arrows landed.

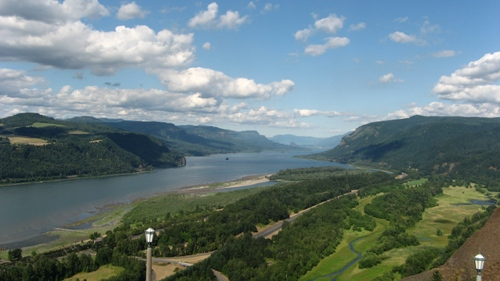
The Columbia River

What is now called the Columbia River became the dividing border between the two brothers’ land claims. The first brother's arrow landed in the Willamette Valley where he became Chief Multnomah of the Multnomah people. The second arrow landed north of the river in what is now modern day Klickitat County where he became chief of the Klickitat people.

=== Legend of Multnomah Falls ===
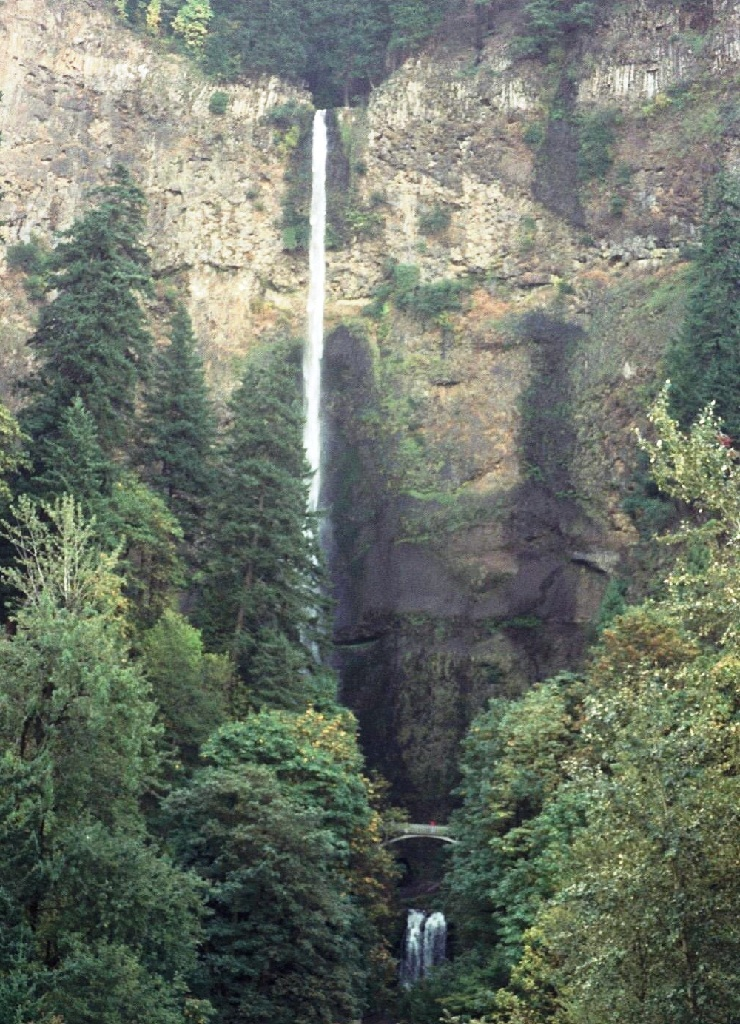
Multnomah Falls, where legend says the Chief's daughter sacrificed herself.

According to Wasco legend, the daughter of Chief Multnomah sacrificed herself to the Great Spirit from the top of Multnomah Falls. Tribes along the Columbia River celebrated the marriage of the Chief's daughter to a neighboring tribe. The happiness didn't last long, however, before the area experienced an illness that affected all of the tribes along the river. The medicine man claimed the Great Spirit told him all of the tribe would die unless the Spirit received a sacrifice; the Chief's daughter's life. The Chief wouldn't allow it, but when the daughter saw the sickness affect her loved ones, she willingly left in the middle of the night to go to the top of the cliff overlooking the Columbia River. She threw herself off the cliff. When the Chief found his daughter's body, he prayed to the Great Spirit for a sign that her spirit was well. Water began pouring from the cliff and became known as Multnomah Falls.

== The Multnomah today ==
Most of the Multnomah people who are still alive today reside in the Grand Ronde Federation and Warm Springs Indian Reservation, but the Multnomah no longer exist as a distinct tribe or people.

=== The name "Multnomah" ===
Many locations in the Pacific Northwest can accredit their names to the Multnomah people. Multnomah County takes its designation from this Native American word. It can also be found in the titles of the Multnomah Athletic Club, Multnomah Falls, Multnomah Village, and the statue of Chief Multnomah in a Portland park.

=== Artwork ===
Located in Portland, Oregon, Washington Park features a statue of Chief Multnomah called Coming of the White Man. The bronze statue was created in 1904 by the sculptor Hermon Atkins MacNeil. He drew inspiration from the popularity of Frederic Balch's book Bridge of the Gods: A Romance of Indian Oregon, which took the stories Balch had heard from Native Americans while growing up and embellished them. The statue features two Native Americans looking eastward along the Oregon Trail. The two men look down upon the route that ox teams trudged bringing settlers to the western United States. The older of the two men is said to be Chief Multnomah of the Multnomah people. The statue was donated to the city of Portland from the descendants of David P. Thompson. MacNeil went on the make other statuettes of Chief Multnomah.

The inspiration and the name of this sculpture comes from Meriwether Lewis and William Clark's expedition across the United States. In 1805, upon arriving in Oregon, Lewis and Clark encountered a village. The men described the village of Native Americans who were known as "mulknomahs" encamped on Sauvie Island, and they originally referred to the now Willamette River as the Mulknoma.

Chief Multnomah was also depicted on linen postcards during the 1900s around 1930 and 1945. He is shown in colorful, traditional clothing. A print is currently part of The Tichnor Brothers Collection from the Boston Public Library. It is part of a series of Oregon related postcards and published by Angelus Commercial Studio of Portland, Oregon.

== See also ==
- Neerchokikoo
