= Watlala =

Group of Chinookan Native Americans

The Watlala are a group of Chinookan-speaking Native Americans. They inhabited the meadows of Sams Walker Day Use Site, near Skamania, Washington, and St. Cloud Ranch Day Use Site. An interpretive sign at Sams Walker states that the Watlata lived in earth-sheltered cedar plank homes. Another reports that they used willow branches to construct temporary structures.

Also called the Cascade Indians, they were a Chinookian tribe who lived at the Cascades of the Columbia River and the Willamette River in Oregon. They fished and hunted the animals in the Cascade. In 1805-06 Lewis and Clark estimated that they numbered about 2,800 and in 1870, along with the Wasco, they had an estimated population of about 3,200. As there were also other tribes lived at or near the cascades and the people were very changeable due to the location being a popular fishing spot, it was impossible to identify them with certainty. Several other known bands, which may have been the Watlala or later have been included under them, included the Cathlakaheckit, Cathlathlala, Cathlayackty, Clahclellah, Katlagakya, Yehuh.

In 1829, the Native Americans of the region suffered an epidemic which was called "ague fever," of unknown nature, which killed in a single summer, some four-fifths of the population. Whole villages disappeared and those that were left were consolidated. After the epidemic, the Watlala seemed to have been the only remaining tribe, the remnants of the others having probably united under that name, though they were commonly called Cascade Indians by the whites. In 1854 they were reported to number only 80 people, and in 1855 they joined in the Wasco Treaty under the name of the "Ki-gal-twal-la band of the Wascoes" and the "Dog River band of the Wasco," and were removed to the Warm Springs Reservation in Oregon. Afterwards, they were no longer enumerated separately and of those that didn't join the Wasco, were thought to have joined the Wishram tribe.
