= Tsin-is-tum =

US Indigenous Elder

Tsin-is-tum (Jennie Michel), as she appeared around the turn of the 20th century.

Tsin-is-tum, also known as Jennie Michel (c. 1814–1905, Clatsop), was a Native American folklorist based on the Pacific Coast of Oregon. Called "Last of the Clatsops" at the time of her death in 1905, Tsin-is-tum was much photographed. She provided oral history for scholars of the Indigenous peoples of the Pacific Northwest region of the United States. Among her accounts was of family members who interacted with members of the Lewis and Clark Expedition in the winter of 1805-1806; she helped historians to locate salt works they had used.

== Biography ==
Tsin-is-tum (known to some during her lifetime as "Jennie Michel") was a Clatsop woman born about 1814 to a family on the coast of what is today part of the American state of Oregon. She was the daughter of a woman named Wah-ne-ask, who was an eyewitness of the Lewis and Clark Expedition that visited the Pacific Northwest in 1805 and 1806. The name of her father has been lost to history. He was killed in a bombardment of her village by a warship, probably in spring 1829.

Tsin-is-tum was recognized by historians associated with the Oregon Historical Society as a source of folklore of the Clatsop people, as well as oral history of the Lewis and Clark Expedition. She had family members who had engaged with the Anglo-America explorers during their 1805-1806 sojourn on the northwest coast of today's state of Oregon. In addition to her mother's recollections, Tsin-is-tum learned from her uncle Ka-ta-ta about his experiences of hunting elk with the explorers. At the time of contact with Meriwether Lewis, William Clark, and their associates, the total population of the Clatsop people had plummeted to as few as 200 people, in the estimation of the Anglo-America visitors. They had suffered high mortality in the late 18th century due to new infectious diseases introduced into the population through contact with outsiders.

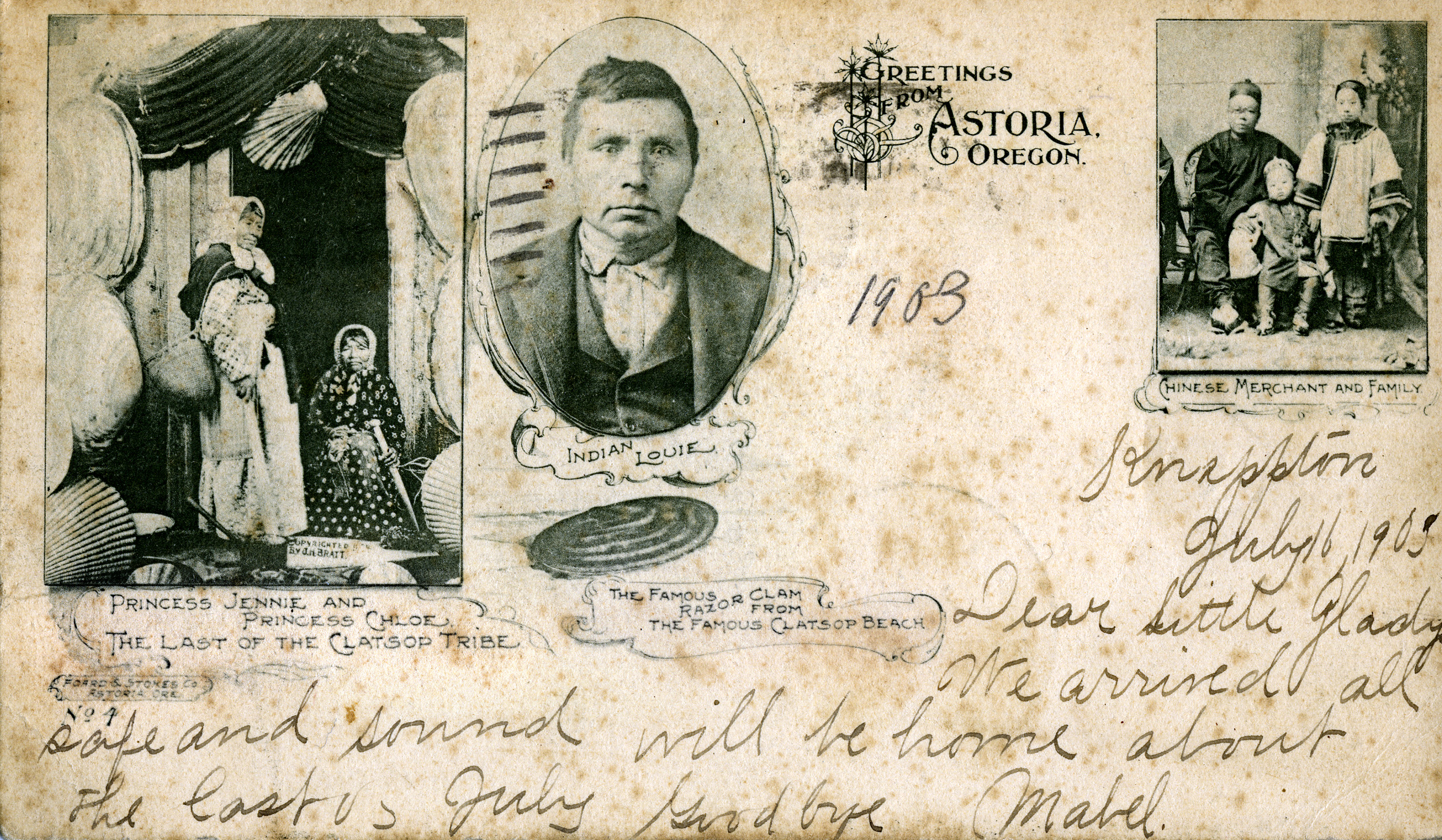
Postcard with image of "Princess Jennie and Princess Chloe, The Last of the Clatsop Tribe".

Tsin-is-tum married the last chief of the Nehalem people, Wah-tat-kum. The couple lived along the Oregon coast between the outlets of the Columbia and Nehalem rivers until his death. She later married again, this time to Michel Martineaux (also written as "Michelle Martineau"), a man of French Canadian descent and a retired steam-boat captain and sailing master. Her alternative name, Jennie Michel was derived from this relationship. The couple lived in the area of Seaside, Oregon.

In June 1900, Tsin-is-tum provided a statement to a committee of the Oregon Historical Society. She described the story of her life and helped identify the location of salt works used by the Lewis and Clark party during their stay in Oregon in the winter of 1805-1806. At the time, she was believed to be one of the last three surviving full-blooded Clatsops.

Tsin-is-tum died in March 1905 at the age of approximately 89. At the time of her death, she was referred to as "the last of the Clatsops" — perhaps the last surviving full-blooded member of that Native American tribe.

== Works ==
- "Testimony of Tsin-is-tum to the Oregon Historical Society," in Proceedings of the Oregon Historical Society, Including the Quarterly Meetings of the Board of Directors, and the Second Annual Meeting of the Members of the Society, Held December 15, 1900. Salem, OR: W.H. Leeds, State Printer, 1901; appendix A, pp. 22–23.
