= Oak Point, Washington =

Unincorporated community in Washington, United States

- Unincorporated community
- Location in the state of Washington Oak Point (the United States)
- Coordinates: 46°11′27″N 123°11′19″W
- Country: United States
- State: Washington
- County: Cowlitz
- Elevation: 318 ft (97 m)
- Time zone: UTC−8 (PST)
  - Summer (DST): UTC−7 (PDT)
- ZIP Code: 98632
- Area code(s): 360, 564
- FIPS code: 53-50410
- GNIS feature ID: 1512521

Oak Point, also known as Oakpoint, (residents use Oak Point) is an unincorporated community in Cowlitz County, Washington. Oak Point is located northwest of the city of Longview, reached by traveling westbound out of the city along Washington State Route 4, also known as Ocean Beach Highway, and turning north onto Mill Creek Road. The Oak Point community is part of the Longview School District, a K-12 school district of about 6,600 students.

== Background ==
Oak Point received its name from the fact George Vancouver and his men came across a grove of oak trees there.

Local lore has it that the community was served by several saloons, a general store, and a post office in the late 19th century, A water powered lumber mill was once located on Mill Creek, near the intersection of Mill Creek Road and Ocean Beach Highway. A "one room" school house served the community until about 1964. The school actually had at least two large rooms and also served as a community center, hosting women's club meetings and community Christmas gatherings. A lumber camp was situated at the end of Hunter Road in the 19th century and a log flume is said to have transported logs to the mill, a distance of approximately 3 miles. Stumps of old growth trees cut during the logging camp's heyday, some of which are up to six feet in diameter, can still be seen throughout the area.

== Geography ==
Oak Point is characterized by thickly forested hills, and steep canyons through which a number of small creeks run. Soil consists of a thin layer of black loam in forested areas and dense red clay throughout. Under the clay is usually found basalt rock a few feet down. The southern limit of the community is bordered by a steep cliff on the Columbia River. This cliff is several hundred feet high. Some homes in the community were threatened when an approximately one mile stretch of the cliff face gave way without warning back in the 1960s.
