= Kathlamet =

Chinookan people on the Columbia River

Total population
- merged into Chinook Indian Nation

Regions with significant populations
- Columbia River, Washington, U.S.

Languages
- Kathlamet language, a Chinookan language

The Kathlamet people are a tribe of Native American people with a historic homeland along the Columbia River in what is today southwestern Washington state. The Kathlamet people originally spoke the Kathlamet language, a dialect or language of the Chinookan language family. They were also called "Guasámas, or Guithlamethl, by the Clackamas", and "Kwillu'chini, by the Chinook."

== Lewis and Clark encounter ==
Lewis and Clark reported "that about 300 Cathlamet occupied nine plank houses on the south side of the Columbia River", and lived between Tongue Point and Puget Island in Clatsop County, Oregon. On the north side, they lived "from the mouth of Grays Bay to a little east of Oak Point."

Clark wrote:

November 11th Monday 1805
About 12 o'clock 5 Indians came down in a canoe, the wind very high from the S.W., with most tremendous waves breaking with great violence against the shores. Rain falling in torrents, we are all wet as usual and our situation is truly a disagreeable one. We purchased of the Indians 13 red char which we found to be an excellent fish. We have seen those Indians above and are of a nation who reside above and on the opposite side who call themselves (Calt-har-ma). They are badly clad & ill made, small and speak a language much resembling the last nation. One of those men had on a sailor's jacket and pantaloons and made signs that he got those clothes from the white people who lived below the point &c. Those people left us and crossed the river (which is about 5 miles wide at this place) through the highest waves I ever saw a small vessels ride. Those Indians are certainly the best canoe navigators I ever saw.

== Later history ==
Kathlamet woman.

"In early January 1806 Cathlamet Chief Shahharwarcap, together with 11 men, visited Fort Clatsop". "About 1810 the Cathlamets moved across the Columbia and joined the Wahkiakums in a village at the present site of Cathlamet." About 50 to 60 Cathlamet remained in 1849.

On August 9, 1851, the Kathlamet ceded lands to the United States in exchange for money, clothing, and other items. They retained two small islands in the Columbia River. On August 24, 1912, the Kathlamet were awarded $7,000 for the loss of their lands.

"The last speakers of Kathlamet died in the 1930s," and the tribe is no longer distinct from the Chinook people. Their descendants are part of the Chinook Indian Nation.

== Villages ==
Their villages were:

- Ika'naiak, on the north side of the Columbia River at the mouth of Coal Creek Slough just east of Oak Point.
- Ilo'humin, on the north side of Columbia River opposite Puget Island and near the mouth of Alockman Creek.
- Kathla'amat, on the south side of Columbia River about 4 miles below Puget Island.
- Ta'nas ilu', on Tanas Ilahee Island on the south side of the Columbia River.
- Wa'kaiyakam, across Alockman Creek opposite Ilo'humin.

== Legacy ==
Queen Sally's Spring in Cathlamet, Washington, is named after the former head of the Kathlamet people, who told stories about her memories of Lewis and Clark as a young girl.

== See also ==
- Cathlamet, Washington
- Chinookan peoples
- Neerchokikoo
