= Upper Chinook language =

Extinct Chinookan language

Upper Chinook
- Kiksht
- Native to: United States
- Region: Columbia River
- Extinct: 11 July 2012, with the death of Gladys Thompson
- Revival: 270 (2009-2013)
- Language family: Chinookan: Upper Chinook
- Dialects: Multnomah; Kiksht; (Kathlamet)

Language codes
- ISO 639-3: wac
- Glottolog: wasc1239
- ELP: Wasco-Wishram

Upper Chinook, endonym Kiksht, also known as Columbia Chinook, and Wasco-Wishram after its last surviving dialect, is a recently extinct language of the US Pacific Northwest. It had 69 speakers in 1990, of whom 7 were monolingual: five Wasco and two Wishram. In 2001, there were five remaining speakers of Wasco.

The last fully fluent speaker of Kiksht, Gladys Thompson, died in July 2012. She had been honored for her work by the Oregon Legislature in 2007. Two new speakers were teaching Kiksht at the Warm Springs Indian Reservation in 2006. The Northwest Indian Language Institute of the University of Oregon formed a partnership to teach Kiksht and Numu in the Warm Springs schools. Audio and video files of Kiksht are available at the Endangered Languages Archive.

The last fluent speaker of the Wasco-Wishram dialect was Madeline Brunoe McInturff, and she died on 11 July 2006 at the age of 91.

== Dialects ==
- Multnomah, once spoken on Sauvie Island and in the Portland area in northwestern Oregon
- Kiksht
  - Watlala or Watlalla, also known as Cascades, now extinct (two groups, one on each side of the Columbia River; the Oregon group were called Gahlawaihih [Curtis]).
  - Hood River, now extinct (spoken by the Hood River Band of the Hood River Wasco in Oregon, also known as Ninuhltidih [Curtis] or Kwikwulit [Mooney])
  - White Salmon, now extinct (spoken by the White Salmon River Band of Wishram in Washington)
  - Wasco-Wishram (the Wishram lived north of the Columbia River in Washington and the kin Wasco lived south of the same river in Oregon)
  - Clackamas, now extinct, was spoken in northwestern Oregon along the Clackamas and Sandy rivers.

Kathlamet has been classified as an additional dialect; it was not mutually intelligible.

== Phonology ==
=== Vowels ===
| | Front | Central | Back |
|---|---|---|---|
| Close | i | | u |
| Mid | ɛ | ə | |
| Open | | a | |

=== Consonants ===
| | | Labial | Alveolar | | | Palatal (-alveolar) | Velar | | Uvular | | Glottal |
| | | Labial | plain | sibilant | lateral | Palatal (-alveolar) | plain | labial | plain | labial | Glottal |
|---|---|---|---|---|---|---|---|---|---|---|---|
| Plosive/ Affricate | tenuis | p | t | ts | tɬ | tʃ | k | kʷ | q | qʷ | ʔ |
| Plosive/ Affricate | ejective | pʼ | tʼ | tsʼ | tɬʼ | tʃʼ | kʼ | kʷʼ | qʼ | qʷʼ | |
| Plosive/ Affricate | voiced | b | d | | | | g | gʷ | | | |
| Fricative | voiceless | | | s | ɬ | ʃ | x | xʷ | χ | χʷ | h |
| Fricative | voiced | | | | | | ɣ | ɣʷ | | | |
| Sonorant | | m | n | | l | j | | w | | | |

== Bibliography ==
- Sapir, Edward; Curtin, Jeremiah (1909). Wishram texts, together with Wasco tales and myths. E.J. Brill. ASIN: B000855RIW.
- Dyk, Walter (1933). A Grammar of Wishram. New Haven: Yale University: Yale University Press.
