= Kathlamet language =

Extinct Chinookan language

Kathlamet
- Cathlamet, Middle Chinook
- Native to: United States
- Region: Washington, Oregon
- Ethnicity: Kathlamet
- Extinct: 1930s, with the death of Charles Cultee
- Language family: Chinookan: Kathlamet

Language codes
- ISO 639-3: None (mis)
- Glottolog: kath1253

Kathlamet (Cathlamet) was a Chinookan language that was spoken around the border of the U.S. states of Washington and Oregon by the Kathlamet people. The most extensive records of the language were made by Franz Boas, and a grammar was documented in the dissertation of Dell Hymes. It became extinct in the 1930s and there is little text left of it.

== Classification ==
Kathlamet was spoken in northwestern Oregon along the south bank of the lower Columbia River. It has been classified as a dialect of Upper Chinook, or as Lower Chinook, but was mutually intelligible with neither.

== Phonology ==
All of the Chinookan languages feature what Mithun (1999) describes as "rich consonant inventor(y) typical of [languages native to] the Northwest coast" and "elaborate phonological processes".

=== Consonants ===
The following table illustrates Kathlamet's consonant phonemes per Hymes (1955, p. 21):

		Bilabial	Alveolar			Velar	Uvular	Glottal
		Bilabial	plain	lateral	sibilant	Velar	Uvular	Glottal
Plosive/ Affricate	tenuis	p	t	tɬ	ts	k	q	
Plosive/ Affricate	ejective	pʼ	tʼ	tɬʼ	tsʼ	kʼ	qʼ	
Continuant		m	n	l	s	x	χ	h

- Hymes' definition of "continuant" includes nasals /m, n/, but most modern literature classifies them as occlusives.
- /l/ is an approximant while /s x χ h/ are fricatives.
- /m, n, l/ may be syllabic.

Boas (1911b) reports that Kathlamet consonant clusters are defined by their position to the word initial, medial and final and the phonemic syllable initial and final. In sequences of consonant where a continuant occurs as nucleus, consonants following the nucleus are taken to appear the separate clusters, the nucleus in none.

=== Vowels ===
	Front		Central		Back	
	short	long	short	long	short	long
Close	i	iː			u	uː
Open	æ		a	aː		

- The semivowels [j, w] are analyzed as allophones of /i, u/ respectively.
- /i, æ/ have mid allophones [e ~ ɛ].

Kathlamet lacks many of the distinguishing features found among the dialects of Upper Chinook including extensive use of sound symbolism, pervasive intervocalic voicing of consonants, and an elaborate tense prefix system. It also features a different collection of initial nominal prefixes and some additional morphemes, such as independent pronouns.

== Morphology ==
Kathlamet has four major word classes: pronouns, nouns, verbs, and articles. Pronoun words are always members of the pronominal stem class. And there are two subclasses of pronoun stems. The first stems of subclass occur with prefixes marking 1st, 2nd and 3rd person. The second stems of subclass occur with prefixed only marking 3rd person. Nouns can be inflected for the initial prefixes, possessive pronominal prefixes and initial prefixes (as nominalizers), in which in similar in form to the prefixes of demonstratives prefixes of verbs. Possessive pronominal prefixes may be inflected for person and number for gender and number prefixes. Verbs may contain initial tense prefixes. Unlike noun and pronoun words, verb may show more than one occurrence of the paradigm. The number of occurrences ranges from one to three mostly by relative order position, partly by special forms. Nouns may be used with the pronominal prefix as an absolutive. Verbs also are used as nominal. Nouns stem belonging to a joint class, such as VN, NP and VNP. Nouns can come in two different types; a simple noun, which is a single stem morpheme; and complex nouns, which have an apparent sequence. Similar to English, adverbials in Kathlamet may be used to indicate directional relations, such as "with" "for" "near" "toward" "out".

Morphemes in Kathlamet can be placed in one of three categories: stems, prefixes, or suffixes. Prefixes can be either derivational or grammatical, where the derivational helps make up a word base. Grammatical prefixes are less common but have more flexibility in their shape.

=== Person, number, and gender ===
Kathlamet nouns form plural in relation to patterns involving the classificatory prefixes and plural suffixes. There are four groups of affixes in Kathlamet.

- Singular: i-, a-, L-
- Plural: -ks, max
- Dual: s-
- Number opposite of singular and plural: t-, L-

The gender categories are extended to all nouns. Kathlamet has 1st, 2nd, 3rd, 4th person, dual and plural possessors.

1st person		n-
2nd person		m-
3rd person	masculine	i-
3rd person	feminine	k-
3rd person	neuter	L-
3rd person	dual	st-
3rd person	plural	t-
4th person		q-

=== Positions ===
Kathlmat noun occurs with both prefixation and sufiixiation. The noun stem has limited complexity. The minimum noun word: prefix plus single stem. And the minimum sequence is classificatory prefix plus possessive inflection plus stem.

Kathlamet contains 7 positions in a noun form.

Position numbers	
Position1	Initial prefixes
Position2	Classificatory prefixes
Position3	Person of possessor
Position4	Stem
Position5	Suffix set 1.
Position6	Number of stem
Position7	Final suffixes

=== One case ===
Pronoun words in Kathlamet are always members of the pronominal stem class. There are two subclasses of pronoun stems. The first subclass of stems occurs with prefixes marking 1st, 2nd and 3rd person. The second subclass of stems occurs with prefixes only marking 3rd person. The plural suffix for human beings is found only in first stems of subclass. The function of the second stems of subclass is noticeably demonstrative. The stems for one are the only numerals not classed as particles, and these occur with 3rd person singular prefixes. They distinguish masculine and feminine gender. From Boas (1901):

The stems of subclass one are:

- -ai- person
  - m-ai-ka you (174.11)
  - i-ai-ma he only (70.14)
  - t-ai-ci those (26.1)
- -a.ni.ua first
  - m-a.ni.ua you first (87.6)

The stems of subclass two are:

- -ax -aXi -uXi person, demonstrative
  - i-ax-ka he/it (55.9/11.5)
  - t-aXi those (73.60
  - u-uXi that (91.4)
- -ixui -ixaui -iqui quantity(of time, items)
  - -uxui many (11.01)
  - L-axui much (250.16)
- -iXat one (human)
  - a-ixat one maiden (20.1)
- -iXt one (not human)
  - a-iXt one basket (15.4)
- -kun other, another
  - a-kun another woman (162.3)

=== Arguments ===
Pronominal affixes are used in Kathlamet for identifying arguments. It doesn't conjoin noun phrases. One entity is with a full noun phrase and established as topic. A dual or plural pronoun is enough to point to the joint participation.

{Aʹqa} guāʹnᴇsum qasxalōʹkcaîtx agāʹxan.
then always {they two picked berries} {her daughter}
"Then she and her daughter always went picking berries."

The same strategy can be used to identify 3rd person members of first and second plural arguments. Because there is the context, pronominal reference is sufficient to identify them. For example:

Ewāʹ tgāʹq¡aqstakuks aqōʹlᴇktca {agᴇʹkikal} antāʹʟxana.
thus {their heads} {are roasted} {my wife} {our smelts}
"The heads of our smelts (those of my wife and me) are roasted."

=== Space, time, modality ===
Kathlamet shows a four-way tense distinction:

1. future: a-
2. present (non-completive): zero
3. immediate past (aorist): i-
4. non- immediate: na-/qa-
- amckunāʹxʟama "you will search for her"
- iōʹstsX "he went down river"
- igîxk¡ēʹʟēna "she strings them"
- tsōpᴇnāʹna "it jumped"

The suffix -tiX relation to time and -pa relation to space. And -tiX after vowel, -pa after consonants.

- qāʹwatîX "several times"
- kōʹpa "there"
- pā wēʹkoa "noon" (lit. there day)

== Revitalization ==
The Lower Chinook people were reduced to a handful of survivors by epidemics in 1829, resulting in the loss of their distinct languages and their disappearance as a clan entity. The Upper Chinook people have survived a while longer, but of their many languages, only Wasco-Wishram survives. In fact, Wasco-Wishram is the only surviving branch of the entire Chinookan language family. Sometimes classified as distinct dialects, the dual dialects of Wasco and Wishram are mutually intelligible so as to be considered the same essential language. They differ only in one phoneme and a few lexical terms.

In 1990 there were 69 speakers (7 monolinguals) of Wasco-Wishram. The final native speaker of Wasco, Gladys Thompson, died in 2012, but not before the language was passed down in part to Deanie Johnson and Val Switzler, both members of the Warm Springs Indian reservation. Both began providing instruction in Wasco-Wishram to other members of the tribe in 2006, but neither Johnson nor Switzler is considered fully fluent.

The last fully fluent speakers of the Wishram dialect, meanwhile, lived in the Yakima reservation in Washington State; all died sometime between 2000 and 2013.

The use and demise of the other Chinookan dialects is too poorly documented to determine when they were last spoken, but collections of text and some grammatical treatments remain, most notably for Shoalwater, Kathlamet, and Clackamas.

== Bibliography ==
- Boas, Franz (1901). Kathlamet Texts. Smithsonian Institution-Bureau of American Ethnology: Bulletin 26. Washington Government Printing Office. ISBN 9781497909311. OCLC 894801325.
- Hymes, Dell (1955). The Language of the Kathlamet Chinook (PhD dissertation). Bloomington, Indiana: Indiana University. OCLC 122473845.
- Hymes, Dell (1987). "A Pattern Of Verbal Irony In Chinookan". International Journal of the Sociology of Language (65): 97–110.
- Mithun, Marianne (1999). The languages of Native North America. Cambridge: Cambridge University Press. ISBN 0-521-23228-7.
