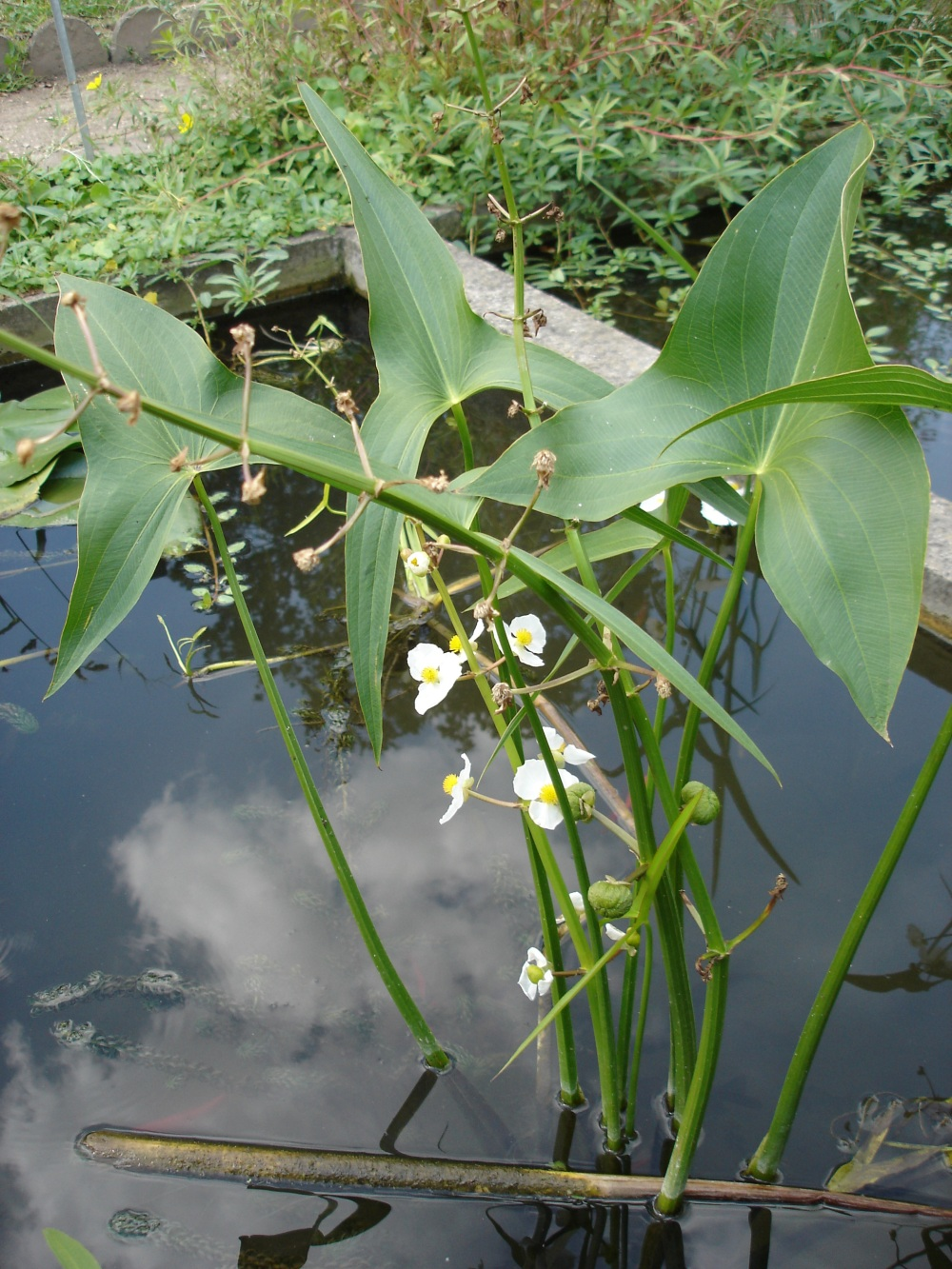

Conservation status
- Least Concern (IUCN 3.1)

Scientific classification
- Kingdom: Plantae
- Clade: Tracheophytes
- Clade: Angiosperms
- Clade: Monocots
- Order: Alismatales
- Family: Alismataceae
- Genus: Sagittaria
- Species: S. latifolia

Binomial name
- Sagittaria latifolia Willd.

= Sagittaria latifolia =

Species of aquatic plant

Arrowhead, raw
Nutritional value per 100 g (3.5 oz)
- Energy: 414 kJ (99 kcal)
- Carbohydrates: 20.23 g
- Fat: 0.29 g
- Protein: 5.33 g
Vitamins and minerals
Vitamins	Quantity %DV^{†}
Thiamine (B1)	14% 0.17 mg
Riboflavin (B2)	6% 0.073 mg
Niacin (B3)	10% 1.65 mg
Pantothenic acid (B5)	12% 0.599 mg
Vitamin B6	15% 0.26 mg
Folate (B9)	4% 14 μg
Vitamin C	1% 1.1 mg
Minerals	Quantity %DV^{†}
Calcium	1% 10 mg
Iron	14% 2.57 mg
Magnesium	12% 51 mg
Manganese	16% 0.36 mg
Phosphorus	14% 174 mg
Potassium	31% 922 mg
Sodium	1% 22 mg
Zinc	3% 0.28 mg
- Link to USDA Database entry
- ^{†}Percentages estimated using US recommendations for adults, except for potassium, which is estimated based on expert recommendation from the National Academies.

Sagittaria latifolia is a wetland plant in the family Alismataceae, native to North America and northern South America; common names include broadleaf arrowhead, duck-potato, Indian potato, or wapato. This plant produces edible tubers that have traditionally been extensively used by Native Americans.

== Description ==
Sagittaria latifolia is a variably sized perennial that may reach as much as 150 centimeters (5 ft) in height, but is more typically 60–120 cm (24–47 in). The plants often grow together in crowded colonies and spread by runners (stolons) at or just under the soil surface. In late summer the plants produce tubers that are twice as long as wide, each typically measuring 0.5 to 5 cm (1/4 to 2 in) in diameter.

The plant produces rosettes of leaves and an inflorescence on a long rigid scape. The leaves are extremely variable, from 10–50 cm (4–19 1/2 in) in length and 1 to 2 cm (1/2 to 3/4 in) thin to wedge-shaped like those of S. cuneata. Spongy and solid, the leaves have parallel venation meeting in the middle and the extremities. The inflorescence is a raceme about 90 cm (35 in) above water and composed of white flowers whorled by threes, blooming from July to September. The flowers are about 2–4 cm (3/4–1 1/2 in) wide and usually divided into female on the lower part and male on the upper of the plant, although some specimens are dioecious. The flowers have three round, white petals and three very short curved, dark green sepals. Flower sex is easy to determine due to the dissimilarity between the 25 to 50 yellow stamens of the male and the sphere of green carpels (sometimes over a thousand) of the female ones.

== Distribution and habitat ==
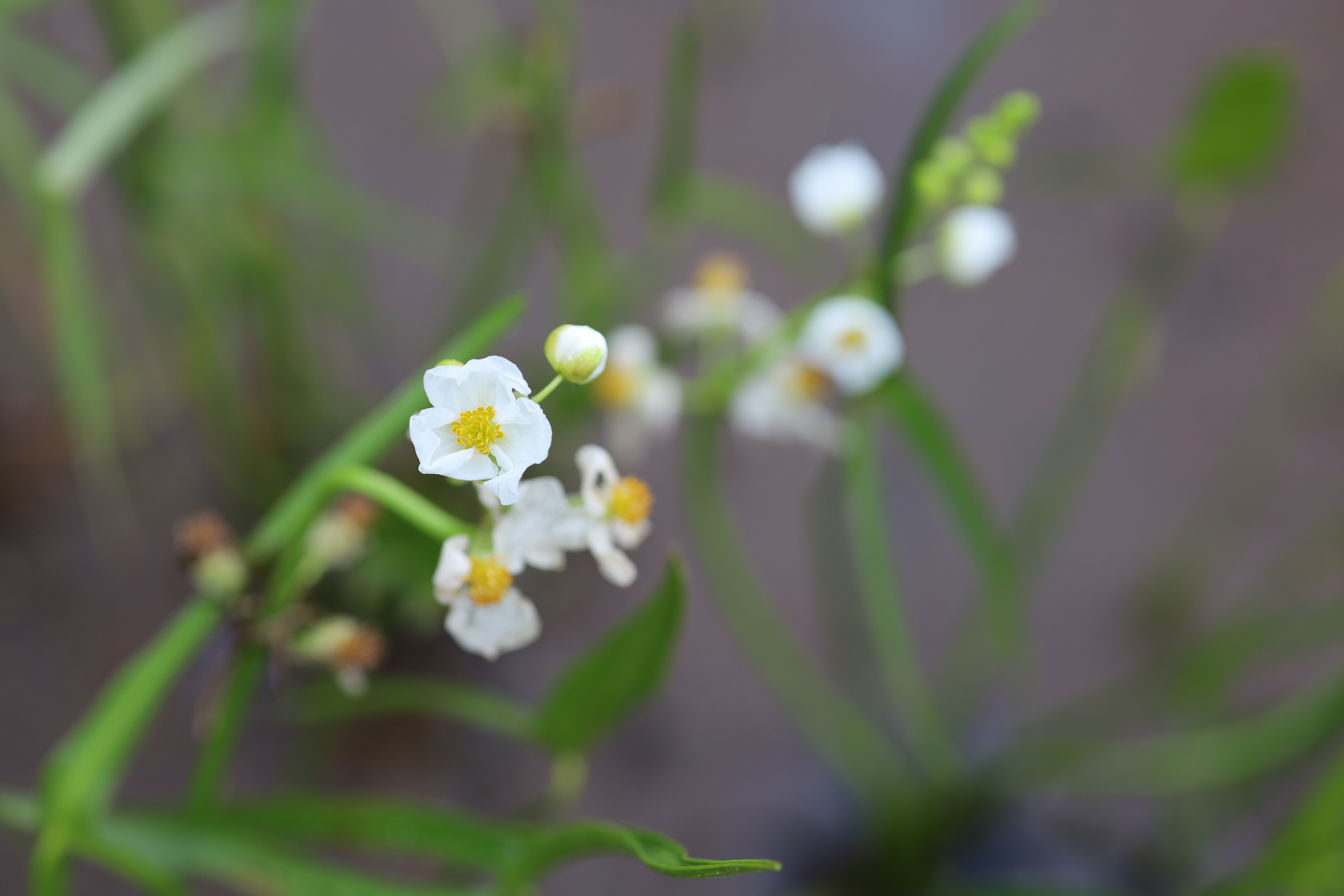
Sagittaria latifolia, Sainte-Anne-de-la-Pérade, Quebec, Canada

Sagittaria latifolia is native to southern Canada and most of the contiguous United States, as well as Mexico, Central America, Colombia, Venezuela, Ecuador, and Cuba. It is also naturalized in Hawaii, Puerto Rico, Bhutan, Australia and much of Europe (France, Spain, Italy, Romania, Germany, Switzerland, the Czech Republic, and European Russia). In Mexico, it is reported from Campeche, Nayarit, Tabasco, Tamaulipas, Puebla, Jalisco, Durango, Tlaxcala, Estado de México, Veracruz and Michoacán.

It can be found in wet areas such as ponds and swamps.

== Ecology ==
Extremely frequent as an emergent plant, broadleaf arrowhead forms dense colonies on very wet soils that become more open as the species mixes with other species of deeper water levels. These colonies form long bands following the curves of rivers, ponds and lakes, well-marked by the dark green color of the leaves. The plant has strong roots and can survive through wide variations of the water level, slow currents and waves. It displays an affinity for high levels of phosphates and hard waters.

Despite the name "duck potato", ducks rarely consume the tubers, which are usually buried too deep for them to reach, although they often eat the seeds. Beavers, North American porcupines, and muskrats eat the whole plant, tubers included. Native Americans are alleged to have opened muskrat houses to obtain their collection of roots.

This plant is vulnerable to aphids and spider mites.

== Cultivation ==
This plant is easily cultivated in 0.15 to 0.45 m (6 to 17 1/2 in) of water with no or little current. The tubers are planted well spaced (no more than 12 plants per square meter) at the end of May at a depth of 5 to 7 cm (2 to 3 in). Fertilize with decomposed manure. They can be multiplied through seeding or division in July. The starchy tubers, produced by rhizomes beneath the wet ground surface, have long been an important food source to the indigenous peoples of the Americas, along with those of S. cuneata. The tubers can be detached from the ground in various ways: with the feet, a pitchfork, or a stick, and after digging up, the tubers usually float to the surface. Ripe tubers can be collected in the autumn, when they are also often found floating freely.

== Uses ==
The starchy tubers were consumed by Native Americans in the lower Columbia River basin, in addition to the Omaha and Cherokee nations. The tubers can be eaten raw or cooked for 15 to 20 minutes. The taste is similar to potatoes and chestnuts, and they can be prepared in the same fashions: roasting, frying, boiling, and so on. They can also be sliced and dried to prepare a flour.

Other edible parts include late summer buds and fruits.

== Culture ==
The name of Shubenacadie, a community located in central Nova Scotia, Canada, means "abounding in ground nuts" (i.e., broadleaf arrowhead) in the Mi'kmaq language.
