= Chinookan languages =

Extinct language family

Chinook
- Tsinúk
- Geographic distribution: Columbia River Valley
- Ethnicity: Chinook
- Extinct: 2012, with the death of Gladys Thompson (Kiksht)
- Linguistic classification: Penutian ?: Chinook
- Subdivisions: Kiksht (Upper Chinook); Kathlamet; Lower Chinook

Language codes
- Glottolog: chin1490
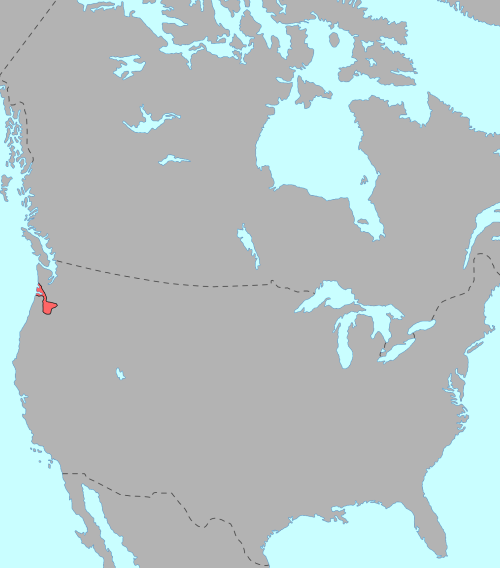
- Pre-contact distribution of Chinookan languages

The Chinookan languages are a small family of extinct languages spoken in Oregon and Washington along the Columbia River by Chinook peoples. Although the last known native speaker of any Chinookan language died in 2012, the 2009-2013 American Community Survey found 270 self-identified speakers of Upper Chinook.

== Family division ==
Chinookan consisted of three languages with multiple varieties. There is some dispute over classification, and there are two ISO 639-3 codes assigned: chh (Chinook, Lower Chinook) and wac (Wasco-Wishram, Upper Chinook). For example, Ethnologue 15e classifies Kiksht as Lower Chinook, while others consider it instead Upper Chinook (discussion), and others a separate language.

- Chinookan
  - † Lower Chinook (also known as Chinook-proper or Coastal Chinook)
  - † Kathlamet (also known as Katlamat, Cathlamet)
  - † Upper Chinook (also known as Kiksht, Columbia Chinook)

== Phonology ==
=== Vowels ===
	Front	Central	Back
Close	i		u
Mid	ɛ	ə	
Open		a	

=== Consonants ===
		Labial	Alveolar			Palatal (-alveolar)	Velar		Uvular		Glottal
		Labial	plain	sibilant	lateral	Palatal (-alveolar)	plain	labial	plain	labial	Glottal
Plosive/ Affricate	tenuis	p	t	ts	tɬ	tʃ	k	kʷ	q	qʷ	ʔ
Plosive/ Affricate	ejective	pʼ	tʼ	tsʼ	tɬʼ	tʃʼ	kʼ	kʷʼ	qʼ	qʷʼ	
Plosive/ Affricate	voiced	b	d				g	gʷ			
Fricative	voiceless			s	ɬ	ʃ	x	xʷ	χ	χʷ	h
Fricative	voiced						ɣ	ɣʷ			
Sonorant		m	n		l	j		w			

== Morphology ==
As in many North American languages, verbs constitute complete clauses in themselves. Nominals may accompany the verbs, but they have adjunct status, functioning as appositives to the pronominal affixes. Word order functions purely pragmatically; Constituents appear in decreasing order of newsworthiness. Clauses are combined by juxtaposition or particles, rather than subordinating inflection.

=== Verbs ===
Verbs may contain an initial tense or aspect prefix, ergative pronominal prefix, obligatory absolutive prefix, dative prefix, reflexive/reciprocal/middle prefix, adverbial prefix, directional prefix, and verb stem. The number of tense/aspect prefix distinctions varies among the languages. Kiksht shows six way tense distinctions: mythic past, remote past, recent past, immediate past, present, and future.

The pronominal prefixes are obligatory, whether free nominals occur in the clause or not. Three can be seen in the Kathlamet verb. The ergative refers to the agent of a transitive verb, the absolutive to the patient of a transitive or the single argument of an intransitive, and the dative to the indirect object. Reflexive prefixes can serve as reciprocals and as medio-passives. When the reflexive follows an ergative–absolutive pronoun sequence, it indicates that one indirectly affected is the same as the ergative. When it follows an absolutive–dative pronoun sequence, it indicates that one indirectly affected is associated with the absolutive, perhaps as the whole in a part-whole relationship, or the owner.

Absolutive pronominal prefixes
		Sing.	Dual	Plural
1st	excl.	n-	nt'-	nc-
1st	incl.	n-	lx-	
2nd		m-	mt-	mc-
3rd	masc.	i-	c-	l-
3rd	fem.	a-	c-	l-
3rd	neut.	l-	c-	l-

Aside from certain secondary irregularities in the third person dual and third person plural, the pronominal subject of the transitive verb differs from the pronominal subject of the intransitive verb only in the case of the third person singular masculine and feminine. The difference between the two sets of forms is for the most part indicated by position and, in part, by the use of a "post-pronominal" particle -g- which indicates that the preceding pronominal element is used as the subject of a transitive verb.

The phonetic parallelism would then be perfect among the absolutive, ergative, and possessive (see below). If we compare the theoretical forms *ag- "she" and *itc- "he" with the remaining subjective forms of the transitive verb, we obtain at once a perfectly regular and intelligible set of forms. Including the "post-pronominal" -g-, the system is as follows:

Ergative pronominal prefixes
		Sing.	Dual	Plural
1st	excl.	n-	nt-g-	nc-g-
1st	incl.	n-	lx-g-	lx-g-
2nd		m-	mt-g-	mc-g-
3rd	masc.	*i-tc-	c-g-	l-g-
3rd	fem.	*a-g-	c-g-	l-g-
3rd	neut.	l-g-	c-g-	l-g-

Verbs stems may be simplex or compound, the second member indicating direction, including motion out of, from water to shore or inland, toward water, into, down or up.

Suffixes include repetitive, causative, involuntary passive, completive, stative, purposive, future, usitative, successful completive and so on.

=== Nouns ===
Nouns contain an initial prefix, pronominal prefix, possessive prefix, inner nominalizer, root, a qualifying suffix, plural, and final suffix. Initial prefixes serve primarily as nominalizers. Masculine prefixes appear with nouns designating male persons, feminine with those denoting female persons. The neuter may indicate indefiniteness. All are used for nouns referring to objects as well. Masculine prefixes appear with the large animals; feminine for small ones. Masculine prefixes also appear with nouns expressing qualities.

The gender-number prefixes are followed by possessive pronominal prefixes. These distinguish possessors by person, clusivity, and number.

The possessive prefix for the third person singular is -ga- when the noun itself is feminine, neuter, dual, or plural. It is -tca- when the noun itself is masculine. It is preceded by the gender-number prefixes:

		Lower Chinook	Wishram
Singular	fem.	ʋ̄	(w)ɑ-
Singular	neut.	L-	ii-
Dual		c-, s-	(ic-, is-)

The possessive prefix for the first person singular ("my") is –gE (Wishram -g-, -k-; -x̩- before k-stops) when the noun is feminine, neuter, dual or plural, but -tcE-, -tci- (Wishram -tc-) when the noun is masculine.

The possessive prefixes are followed by noun stem, perhaps including another nominalizer. Nominal suffixes indicate emphasis or contrast, specificity, succession in time, definiteness, plurality, and time, location, or similarity.

== Sociolinguistics ==
There were Lower and Upper Chinookan groups, but only a single variety of the latter now survives: Wasco-Wishram (Wasco and Wishram were originally two separate, similar varieties). In 1990, there were 69 speakers (7 monolinguals) of Wasco-Wishram; in 2001, 5 speakers of Wasco remained; the last fully fluent speaker, Gladys Thompson, died in 2012.

Chinook-speaking groups were once powerful in trade, before and during early European contact (Lewis & Clark), hence developed the Chinook Jargon – a pre-European contact language, with lexicon from at least Chinook, Chehalis, and Nootka or Nuu-chah-nulth.

Chinook people were quickly diminished by European diseases: Numbered around 800 persons in 1800; they mixed with Chehalis (in fact, the very word Chinook is a Chehalis word for those who lived on the south of the river). Most of the language family became extinct as separate groups by 1900, except a few hundreds who mixed with other groups. Around 120 people in 1945, though some 609 were reported in the 1970s, having by then mixed extensively with other groups. Language is now extinct.

Chinook Jargon flourished from the 1790s to the 1830s, then experienced a flood of English and French new vocabulary. It was used by up to 100,000 speakers of 100 mother tongues in the 19th century. Then declined, was recorded by linguists in the 1930s, and died out by the early 1900s. The Chinook people were finally recognized by the US Government in January 2001, but in the 90-day grace period the Quinault Tribe filed an appeal stating that the Chinook Nation made mistakes when applying for federal recognition.

== See also ==
- Chinook Jargon

== Bibliography ==
- Mithun, Marianne. (1999). The languages of Native North America. Cambridge: Cambridge University Press. ISBN 0-521-23228-7 (hbk); ISBN 0-521-29875-X.
