= Indigenous peoples of the Northwest Plateau =

Regional culture in North America

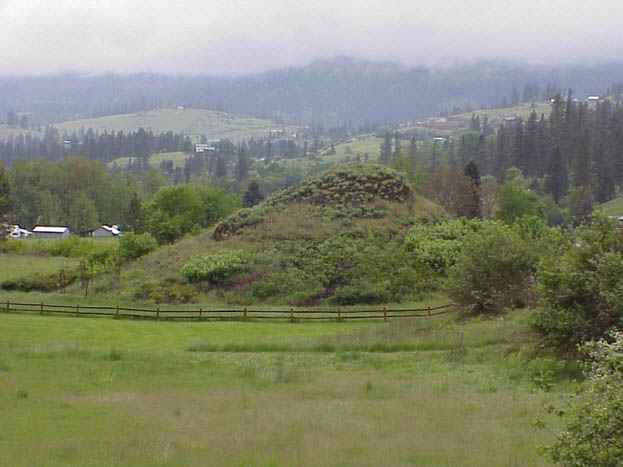
Heart of the Monster, Nez Perce National Historical Park, Lapwai, Idaho

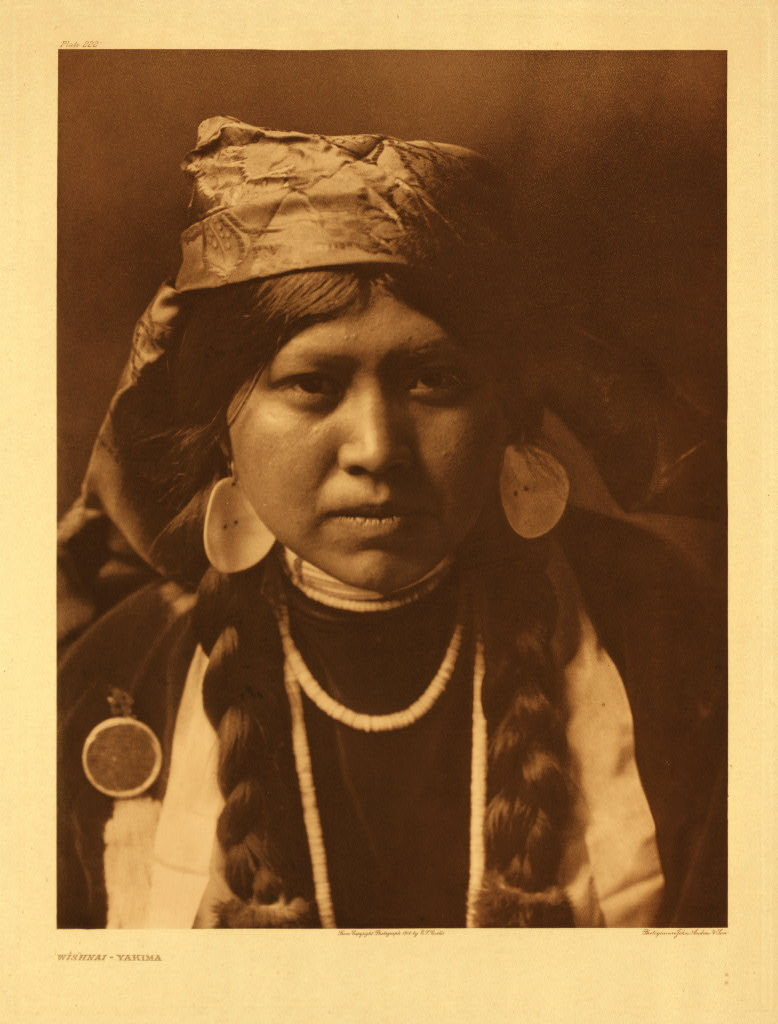
Yakama woman, photographed by Edward Curtis

Indigenous peoples of the Northwest Plateau, also referred to by the phrase Indigenous peoples of the Plateau, and historically called the Plateau Indians (though comprising many groups) are Indigenous peoples of the Interior of British Columbia, Canada, and the non-coastal regions of the Northwestern United States.

Their territories are located in the inland portions of the basins of the Columbia and Fraser Rivers. These tribes mainly live in parts of the Central and Southern Interior of British Columbia, northern Idaho, western Montana, eastern Washington, eastern Oregon, and northeastern California. The eastern flank of the Cascade Range lies within the territory of the Plateau peoples.

There are several distinguishing features that differentiate plateau culture from the surrounding Native cultures. These include a high reliance on roots, such as biscuitroot and camas, as a food source, a high reliance on short duration salmon and eel runs, and long-term habitation of winter villages at fixed locations along rivers or lakes. There was a lack of social stratification and a lack of tribal organization beyond the village level.

== Range ==
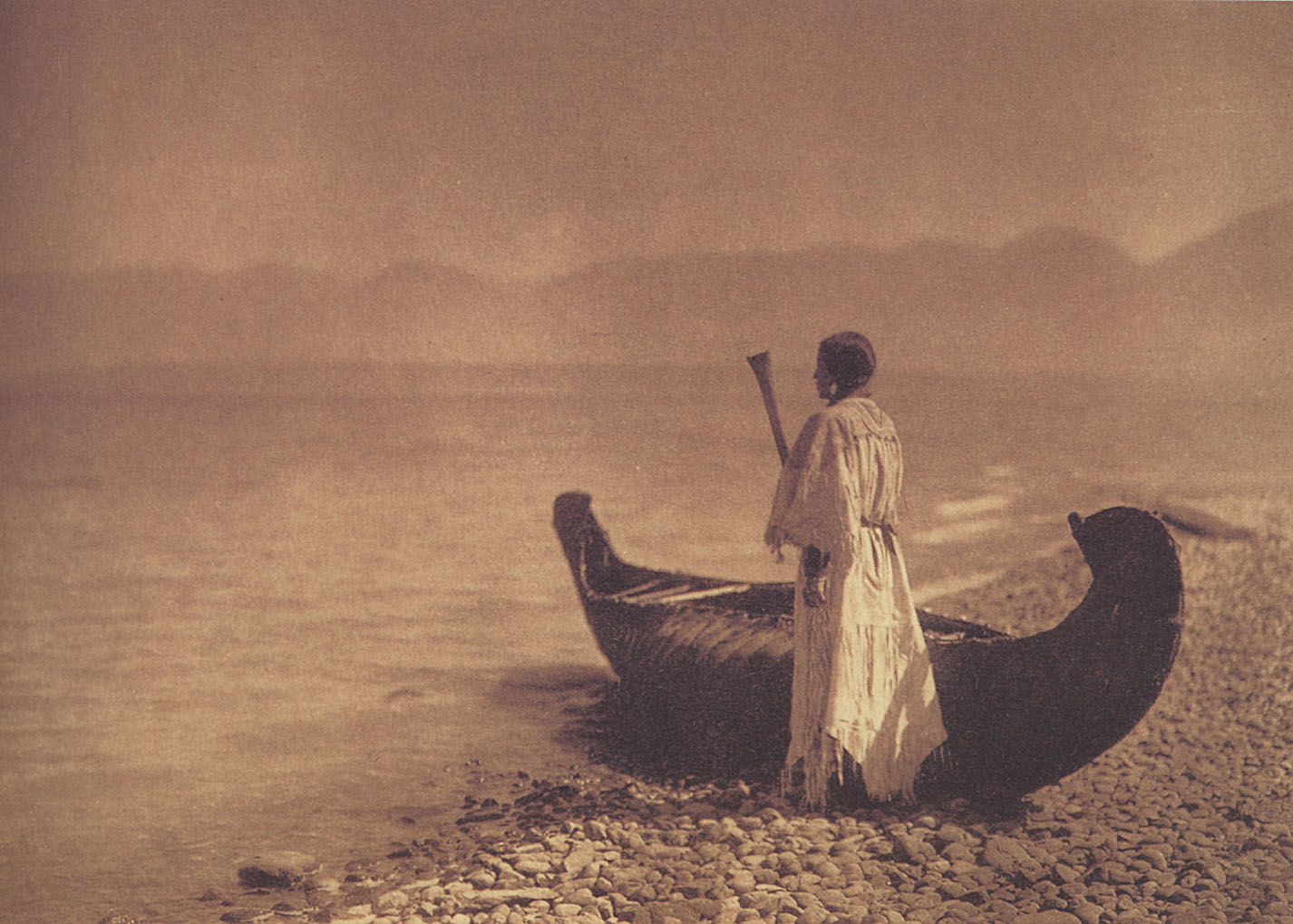
Kutenai Woman, 1910 photogravure by Edward Curtis

In Canada, the greater part of the Interior Plateau was inhabited by Interior Salish peoples: the Lillooet tribe whose homelands are in the Lillooet River Valley; the Thompson First Nations, whose homelands are in the Fraser River Valley from Yale to Lillooet; the Secwepemc (Shuswap) of the Fraser River Valley from Lillooet to Alexandria, the upper parts of the Thompson River basin, and areas further east; the Okanagan of the Okanagan River Valley and its vicinity; also the Lakes people of the Arrow Lakes. The Kutenai tribe, who live in the southeastern parts of British Columbia and formerly extended to southwestern Alberta, speak an isolate language. Athapaskan-speaking people, the Chilcotin and Carrier, occupy the northernmost part of the Plateau region.

The First Nations of the Plateau were influenced by the First Nations of the Pacific Coast. The Plateau First Nations traded many goods with the Pacific Coast First Nations. The Pacific tribes believed in clan ancestors which were adopted by the Interior Salish groups, but they did not adopt the social system.

In the United States, Interior Salish people inhabited the Columbia River and its tributaries above Priest Rapids, near present-day Mattawa. Sahaptin people inhabited the Columbia River and its tributaries between Priest Rapids and Celilo Falls near the Dalles, Oregon and up the Snake River to near the Washington - Idaho border. The Nez Perce inhabited the Clearwater and Salmon River basins and the Snake river through Hells Canyon. The Cayuse homeland is the Blue Mountains and the valleys of the rivers that flow from them. The Molala inhabited the eastern side of the cascade mountains in Oregon. The Klamath people inhabited the upper Klamath River basin and had close contact with people from the California cultural area, though their lifestyle and language were more characteristic of plateau culture.

The Columbia River below Celilo Falls was inhabited by Chinook people. Chinook people on the lowest portion of the Columbia are considered part of the Northwest Coast. Sahaptin groups also lived in Western Washington on the Mashel River and upper Cowlitz River. The Willamette Valley was inhabited by the Kalapuya people. Having no major salmon run, their culture was somewhat different from other plateau people, maintaining oak savannas similar to many California Native people.

== History ==
While plateau people kept no written records, the prehistory of the plateau region can be partially reconstructed by a combination of oral traditions, linguistics and archeological evidence. There is archeological evidence of human presence on the plateau for at least 12,000 years. The Marmes Rockshelter and Kennewick Man are two examples of early human presence. Over time human technologies adapted to the unique environment. Earth ovens near camas meadows have been found that are up to 8,000 years old. Around 4,000 years ago, there was a shift in the archeological record from small bands to larger semi-sedentary villages, and a shift towards root processing tools, hallmarks of plateau culture.

Linguists and oral traditions point to several comparatively recent movements of people. According to language comparisons, the interior Salish peoples expanded onto the plateau from the vicinity of the lower Fraser River. This expansion reached as far as Montana, was complete around 1,500 years ago. Likewise, Athabaskans on the plateau are part of a relatively recent expansion from northern Canada and Alaska, as recently as 1,000 years ago. The Kalapuya people spread into the Willamette Valley, likely from the south, in the last 1,000 years.

The recent expansion of Numic people across the Great Basin displaced several groups on the southern edge of the plateau. This process was still occurring at the time of European contact. Around 1730, horses were introduced onto the plateau from the Great Basin and were first adopted by the Cayuse and Nez Perce. This greatly changed the range and lifestyle of these groups. This transition was still underway when Europeans arrived.

According to their oral tradition, the Kutenai people originated to the east, and moved onto the plateau in late pre-historic times.

=== European contact ===
Outside influences began changing life on the plateau decades before the first direct contact with Europeans. There is strong evidence the smallpox epidemic of the 1770s spread across the plateau region, greatly reducing the population. Members of the Lewis and Clark Expedition were the first Europeans to encounter plateau Native people, followed a few years later by Alexander Ross and David Thompson. All commented on the dress, diet and generally peaceful nature of the inhabitants. In the following decades, several trading posts were established in the area, including the long-lived Fort Nez Perce, Fort Colville, Fort Okanogan, and Fort Kamloops. Several more epidemics hit the area with the Lower Columbia area being the hardest hit. Some Chinook and Kalapuya groups saw a 90% reduction in population at this time. The 1862 Pacific Northwest smallpox epidemic devastated the coast as well as some parts of the interior.

While there was some minor violence, serious armed conflicts did not begin until the mass migration of European Americans to the southern portion of the plateau region, starting in the 1840s. Through a series of treaties and conflicts, including the Cayuse War, Yakima War, Coeur d'Alene War, Modoc War, and Nez Perce War, Native people on the southern plateau were confined on reservations and their traditional lifestyle was largely disrupted.

== Tribes and bands ==
Plateau peoples generally self-identified by their wintering village or band, as opposed to a tribe. Intermarrying between groups was common and in many cases encouraged. Different groups shared hunting and foraging ranges. After European contact, Native people were classified into tribes led by chiefs, in order to facilitate negotiation and land settlements. Commonly recognized plateau tribes include the following:

=== Chinook peoples ===
- Cathlamet, Washington
- Clackamas, Oregon
- Clatsop, Oregon
- Kathlamet
- Multnomah, Oregon
- Wasco-Wishram, Oregon and Washington
- Watlata, Washington

=== Interior Salish peoples ===
- Chelan
- Coeur d'Alene Tribe, Idaho, Montana, Washington
- Entiat, Washington
- Flathead (Selisch or Salish), Idaho and Montana
  - Bitterroot Salish
  - Kalispel (Pend d'Oreilles), Washington and Montana
    - Lower Kalispel, Washington
    - Upper Kalispel, Montana
- In-SHUCK-ch, British Columbia (Lower Lillooet)
- Lil'wat, British Columbia (Lower Lillooet)
- Methow, Washington
- Nespelem, Washington
- Nlaka'pamux (Thompson people), British Columbia
- Nicola people (Thompson-Okanagan confederacy)
- Okanagan, British Columbia and Washington
- Sanpoil, Washington
- Secwépemc, British Columbia (Shuswap people)
- Sinixt (Lakes), British Columbia, Idaho, and Washington
- Sinkayuse
- Sinkiuse-Columbia, Washington (extinct)
- Spokane people, Washington
- St'at'imc, British Columbia (Upper Lillooet)
- Wenatchi (Wenatchee)

=== Sahaptin people ===
- Upper Cowlitz or Taidnapam
- Kittitas (Upper Yakima)
- Klickitat people, Washington
- Lower Snake people: Chamnapam, Wauyukma, Naxiyampam
- Nez Perce, Idaho
- Palus (Palouse), Idaho, Oregon, and Washington
- Skinpah (Skin)
- Tenino (Warm Springs Bands)
- Umatilla, Oregon
- Walla Walla, Washington
- Wanapum, Washington
- Yakama, Washington

=== Other or multiple ===
- Cayuse, Oregon
- Cowlitz, Washington
- Klamath, Oregon
- Kalapuya, northwest Oregon
  - Atfalati (Tualatin, northwest Oregon)
  - Mohawk River, northwest Oregon
  - Santiam, northwest Oregon
  - Yaquina, northwest Oregon
- Kutenai (Kootenai, Ktunaxa), British Columbia, Idaho, and Montana
- Modoc, California and Oregon, now also Oklahoma
- Molala (Molale), Oregon
- Nicola Athapaskans (extinct), British Columbia
- Upper Nisqually (Mishalpan)

== Languages ==
Plateau tribes primarily spoke Interior Salish languages in the north and Plateau Penutian languages in the south. Chinookan languages were spoken on the lower Columbia and Kalapuyan languages were spoken in the Willamette valley. These are often classified as Penutian languages, but this classification is not universally agreed upon. In the northernmost portion of the plateau Athabaskan languages were spoken. Each of these language families consisted of multiple languages that were not mutually intelligible. Many of the individual languages had several dialects with significant differences.

The Ktunaxa speak the Kutenai language, which is a language isolate. The Cayuse language died out shortly after European contact and is poorly documented. It is sometimes called an isolate, and sometimes classified as Penutian, most closely related to the Molala language. Even before relocation onto reservations, many Cayuse had adopted the Nez Perce language.

== Material culture ==
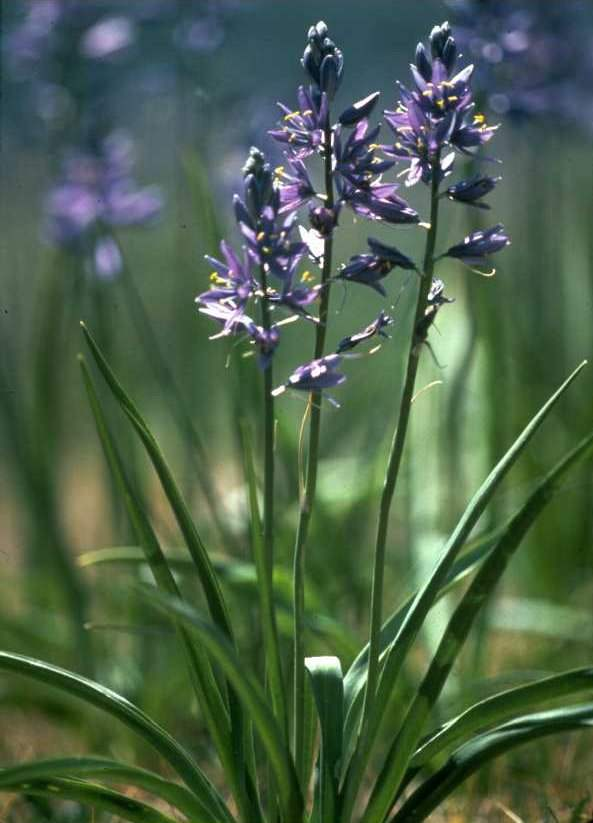
Indian camas, Camassia quamash

=== Diet ===
Traditional Plateau cuisine include wild plants, fish, especially salmon, and game. Plateau peoples often had seasonal villages or encampment in different areas to take full advantage of the wild foods. Women gathered a large variety of edible vegetables and fruits, including camassia, bitterroot, kouse root, serviceberry, chokecherry, huckleberry, and wild strawberry.

Camas lily bulbs were an important but dangerous staple. Common camas, camassia quamash, is a plant in the lily family with blue flowers, whose bulbs were dug for food. The white flowering death camas, zygadenus venenosus, is a different but related species also in the lily family, and can be deadly poisonous. For safety reasons, Plateau peoples gathered these bulbs while aerial parts were still growing in order to correctly identify the edible species. They dug these bulbs with deer antlers. Women in the tribe cooked the roots in a shallow pit filled up with hot stones. When the ground around the stones was hot enough, the stones were removed, and bulbs were placed in the hole to cook overnight.

Plateau women made berry cakes using Saskatoon berries or huckleberries. The berries were dried on racks covered with leaves. Most plateau groups also gathered a lichen (Bryoria fremontii), which was cooked in pits similar to, and sometimes together with, camas. Gathering and processing of wild plants by the women is still a traditional way of life among many of the people of these tribes today.

The men supplemented the diet by hunting and fishing, with salmon making up a major part of their food supply. When horses were introduced to the area, the world of the Plateau people expanded after they adopted use of horses, allowing them to trade with the tribes on the plains east of the Rocky Mountains for bison meat and hides. Groups of hunters rode far to hunt bison, deer, and elk.

In the spring and fall, salmon would swim up rivers from the Pacific Ocean. Plateau fishermen learned many ways to trap salmon. Dipnets, gaffs, or gigs were used depending on the fishing spot. On primary rivers, seine nets were used in spots where salmon or eels were known to congregate. Stakes were lined up to make a weir, stopping the salmon from swimming any further, and then the fish were pulled out of the water with a scoop. Suckers were caught in fish traps as they descended peripheral streams. Most salmon was smoked on a fire, and some of it was stored underground in pits. Other salmon was boiled in hot water to get oil.

Birds were often hunted with nets. Men used several methods to capture big game. Groups of men would surround and drive deer or elk towards other hunters or into traps. Trapping pits and snares were also used. Reliance on big game depended greatly on the amount of salmon available. Hunting provided less than ten percent of food for some Chinook and Sahaptin groups on the Columbia River. Further upstream there was greater reliance on hunting.

=== Basketry and textiles ===
Plateau tribes excelled in the art of basketry. They most commonly used hemp dogbane, tule, sagebrush, or willow bark. These materials were also used to make hats, bedding, nets, and cordage. Basketry was particularly important because plateau tribes used no pottery. Water was boiled in baskets by inserting heated stones. Ancestors of the Plateau Indians created the oldest known shoes in the world, the Fort Rock sandals, made of twined sagebrush and dated between 10,390 and 9650 years BP.

=== Tools ===
Tools were made from wood, stone, and bone. Arrows for hunting were made from wood and tipped with arrow-heads chipped from special rocks. Antlers from animals were used for digging roots. In addition to their traditional tools, they later adopted the use of metal items such as pots, needles, and guns acquired from trade with Europeans.

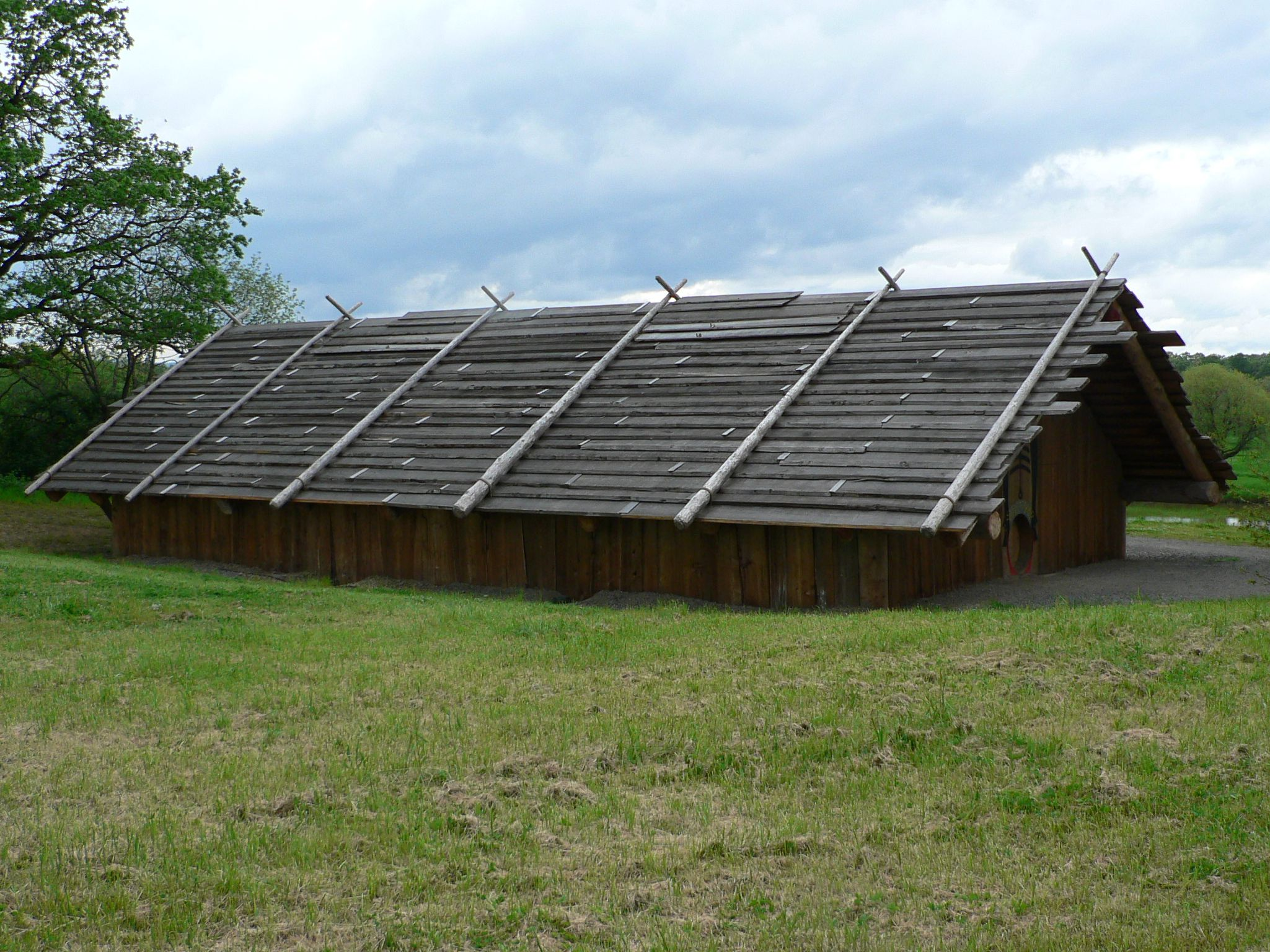
Cathlapotel longhouse, Washington

=== Housing ===
Plateau housing included longhouses roofed with summer tule mats. Tule, used for many purposes, is a tall, tough reed that grows in marshy areas and is sometimes called bulrush. For winter quarters, the people dug a pit a few feet into the ground and constructed a framework of poles over it, meeting in a peak above. They covered this with tule mats or tree bark. Earth was piled up around and partially over the structure to provide insulation to the semi-subterranean shelter. The large winter lodges were shared by several families; they were rectangular at the base and triangular above. They were built with several layers of tule; as the top layers of tule absorbed moisture, they swelled to keep moisture from reaching lower layers and the inside of the lodge.

In later years, the people used canvas instead of tule mats. Beginning in the 18th century, Plateau peoples adopted tipis from the Plains Indians. They were made of a pole framework, covered with animal skins or mats woven from reeds. Each month, women would stay temporary in round menstrual huts, measuring about 20 feet (6.1 m) in diameter.

Interior Salish winter homes are distinct from those of First Nations in the area. They were semi-subterranean pit-houses, with well insulated roofs. Logs were carved into steps at the entrances. Dried food was stored outside these winter houses. In the summer, the Salishan people lived in tule mat houses.

Other tribes made their homes out of pieces of cedar or spruce bark. The slanted roofs of cedar homes extended near to the ground, while the spruce-bark houses resembles to adjacent tents.

=== Clothing ===
Plateau people wore many types of clothing which changed over time. In the northern region, the women wore buckskin shirts, breech cloths, leggings, and moccasins, and the men wore longer shirts. Winter clothing was made out of rabbit, groundhog, or other animals' fur. Along the Columbia River among the Chinook and Sahaptin, both men and women typically wore just a breech cloth in warm weather. A short robe or cape and leggings would be added in cooler weather. Below the Cascades Rapids women wore grass skirts. Women on the southern plateau wore basketry hats. Over time, plateau people generally adopted clothes inspired by plains culture, including buckskin dresses and feathered headgear.

== Arts ==
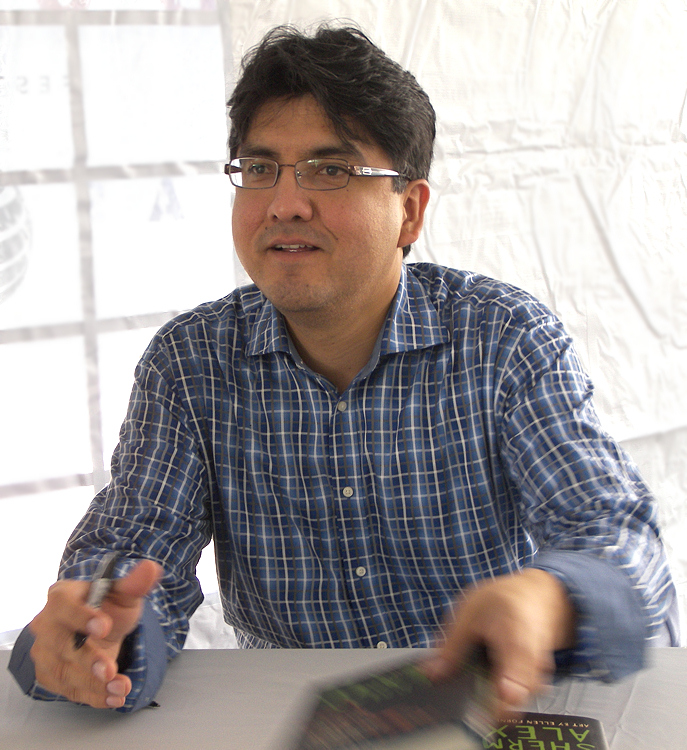
Sherman Alexie, Spokane/Coeur d'Alene novelist, screenwriter, and poet

Today, Native people still make traditional clothing, bags, baskets, and other items. Although some knowledge of traditional arts have been lost as times change, practicing the fine skills are still an important part of their way of life. Mothers and grandmothers decorate their children's outfits for celebration and dancing. Beaded items, such as drums, woven bags and other crafts are used in traditional celebrations and special occasions. Such regalia is used for days during the Spirit Dance, which occurred once a year.
