= Skinpah =

Indigenous people of America

Sk'inłáma
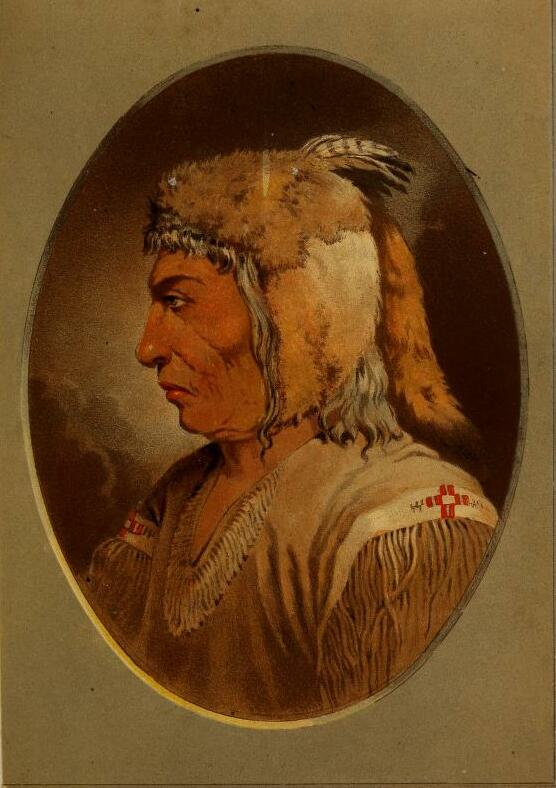
- Portrait of Skinpah chief Mancemuckt

Languages
- Sahaptin

Related ethnic groups
- Tenino people, other Sahaptin peoples

The Skinpah (Sahaptin: Sk'inłáma, pronounced [skʼinˈɬama]) were a Sahaptin-speaking people of the Tenino dialect living along the northern bank of the Columbia River in what is now south-central Washington. They were first recorded as the E-nee-shers in 1805 by Lewis and Clark. Their village, Sk'in, was located adjacent to Celilo Falls in modern-day Klickitat County.

They were signatories of the Yakama Treaty of 1855 at Walla Walla, and were relocated onto the Yakama Reservation as one of the fourteen constituent bands incorporated into the Yakama Nation. Some Skinpah returned to Celilo Falls after relocation, living in Sk'in in close association with the Tenino Wayámpam band until the area was buried under Lake Celilo by the 1957 completion of The Dalles Dam. As a result, some enrolled with the Warm Springs Indian Reservation and contributed to the founding of Celilo Village.

== Etymology ==
The term Sk'inłáma, meaning 'the people of Sk'in', is the dominant Sahaptin endonym for the Skinpah.

Various names have been used in the English-language sources to refer to the Skinpah. Eneeshur and Eneesher were used by the Lewis and Clark expedition in late 1805 to refer to a range of Sahaptin peoples speaking the Tenino dialect within modern Klickitat County.

Skinpah is a transliteration of sk'inpa, the locative form of Tenino sk'in 'cradleboard', a reference to a local rock formation which gave the principal village its name. Various other transliterations and spellings (Skeen, Skin, Skein, Sk'in-pam) are also used to refer to the group.

== Culture ==
The Skinpah were extensive salmon fishermen, sharing the lucrative Celilo Falls fishing grounds with other Sahaptin and Upper Chinookan peoples. Like other Columbia Gorge communities, they produced powdered salmon cakes (Sahaptin ch'láy, Wasco-Wishram killuk). These could be stored for up to a year. Great Basin groups such as the Paiute and Hudson Bay Company traders traded with the Skeen, trading goods such as horses, guns, knives, and cloth for ch'láy. The Skinpah typically wore clothes fashioned from deerskin.

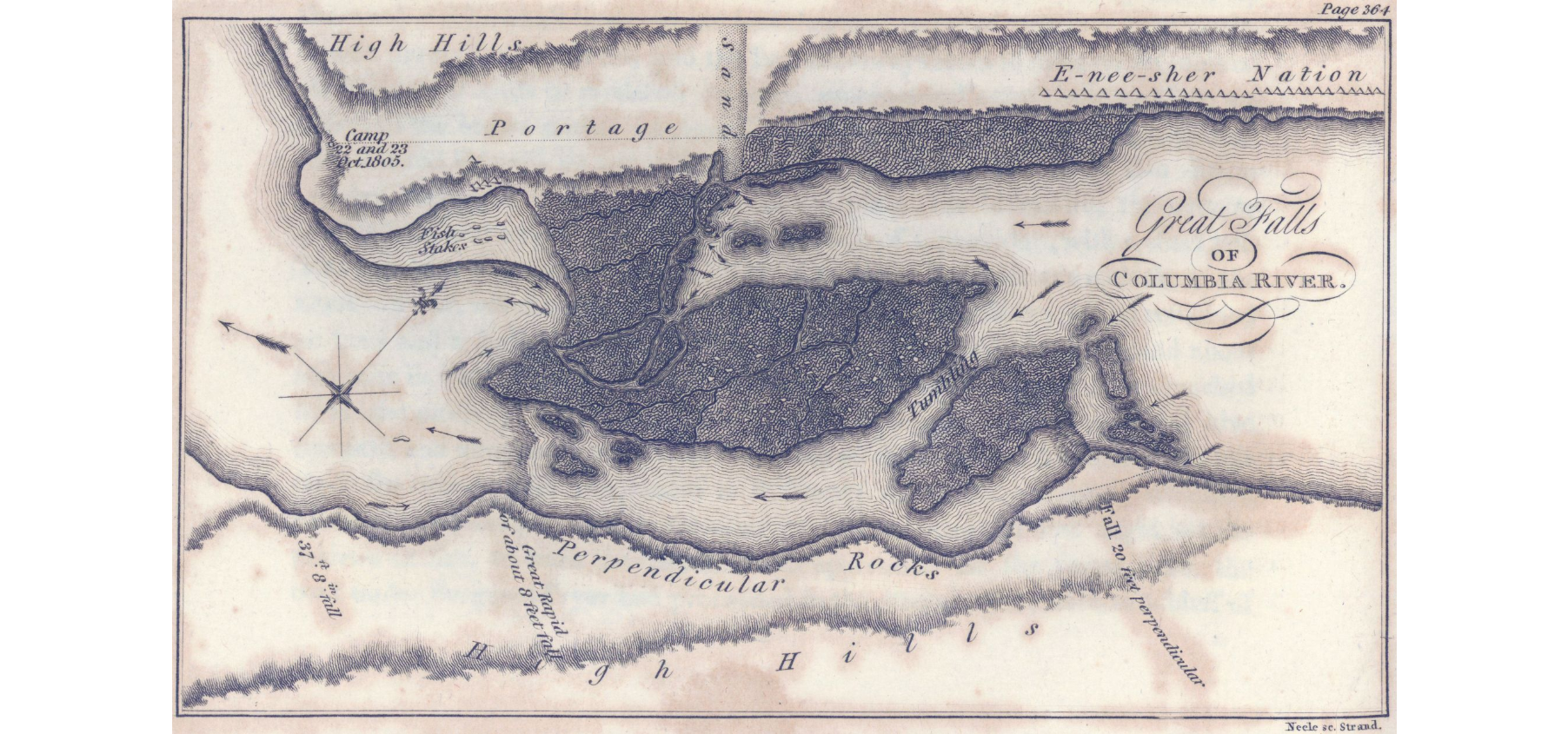
The location of the E-nee-sher as shown on Meriwether Lewis' map of Celilo Falls

== History ==
Human presence in the vicinity of Celilo Falls is attested from c. 7000 BCE.

Before colonization, Sk'in was one of various Sahaptin and the Upper Chinookan fishing villages along the Columbia. Other tribal communities active in the Celilo Falls region included the Upper Chinookan, Wasco, and Wishram; and the Sahaptin Klickitat, Yakama, Tygh, and Tenino.

Immediately downstream was the village of Wapáykt, closely associated with Sk'in and grouped under Skinpah in the 1855 Yakama Treaty. By the mid-19th century, the two villages had become essentially synonymous. Across the river was Wayám, the chief village of the Wayámɫáma band of Tenino (also known as the Celilo). Upstream was the village of Qmił (or K'míł) at Rock Creek Canyon.

During the return journey of the Lewis and Clark expedition, a village later associated with Sk'in was marked as having 19 lodges. Villages were the nexuses of regional and cultural interaction for the groups along the Columbia Gorge.

During the Yakima War, some members of the otherwise neutral Skinpah joined the Yakama and other Plateau groups in raids against American settlers. Chief Men-ni-nock signed the 1855 Yakama Treaty as a member of the "Skin-pah band of Yakama", beginning the relocation of Skinpah to the Yakama reservation. Sk'in was destroyed by the US Army during the war.

Fishing rights to the area were maintained, and Sk'in was rebuilt in the decades following the war to enable access to the lucrative fishing sites at Celilo Falls. With significant conflict over local fishing rights between settlers and natives, white vigilantes destroyed Sk'in again in 1932, burning the village while its residents were away.

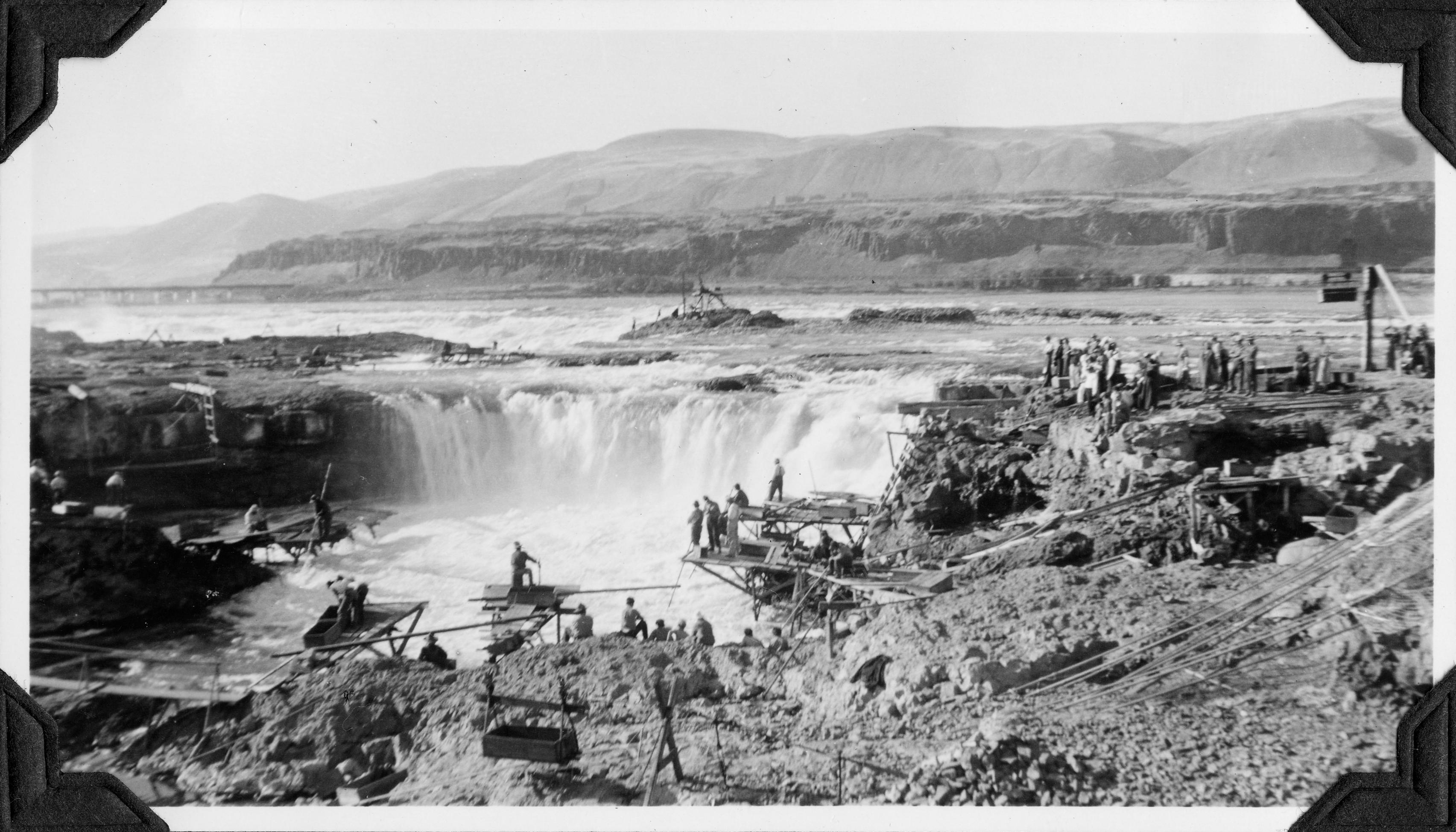
Native salmon fishermen at Celilo Falls, c. 1930s – c. 1940s.

Following the 1932 arson, Skinpah fishermen moved across the river to a site named Waxlaytq'ish. Both this site and the traditional village site of Sk'in were buried under Lake Celilo following the construction of The Dalles Dam. Skinpah contributed to the settlement of Celilo Village, which survived the flooding of Celilo Falls and still stands in the vicinity of the former Sk'in settlement. Descendants of the Skinpah are today enrolled in the Yakama and Warm Springs nations.

== Notable people ==
- Skimiah, (Note: Sahaptin: Shχmáya) prophet and contemporary of Smohalla
- Me-ni-nockt, signatory of the Yakama Treaty of 1855 at the Walla Walla Council
