= Celilo =

Celilo may refer to:

- Celilo Canal
- Celilo Falls
- Celilo Village, Oregon
- Celilo Converter Station
- The Celilo (tribe) of Native Americans
