= Wishram =

Wishram may refer to:

- Wasco-Wishram, two Native American tribes from Oregon
- Wasco-Wishram language, a dialect of Upper Chinook, a Chinookan language
- Wishram, Washington, a census-designated place in the U.S. state of Washington
- Wishram village, formerly the largest village occupied by the Wishram tribe.
