= Celilo Canal =

Columbia River bypass

Coordinates: 45.649543°N 121.049514°W

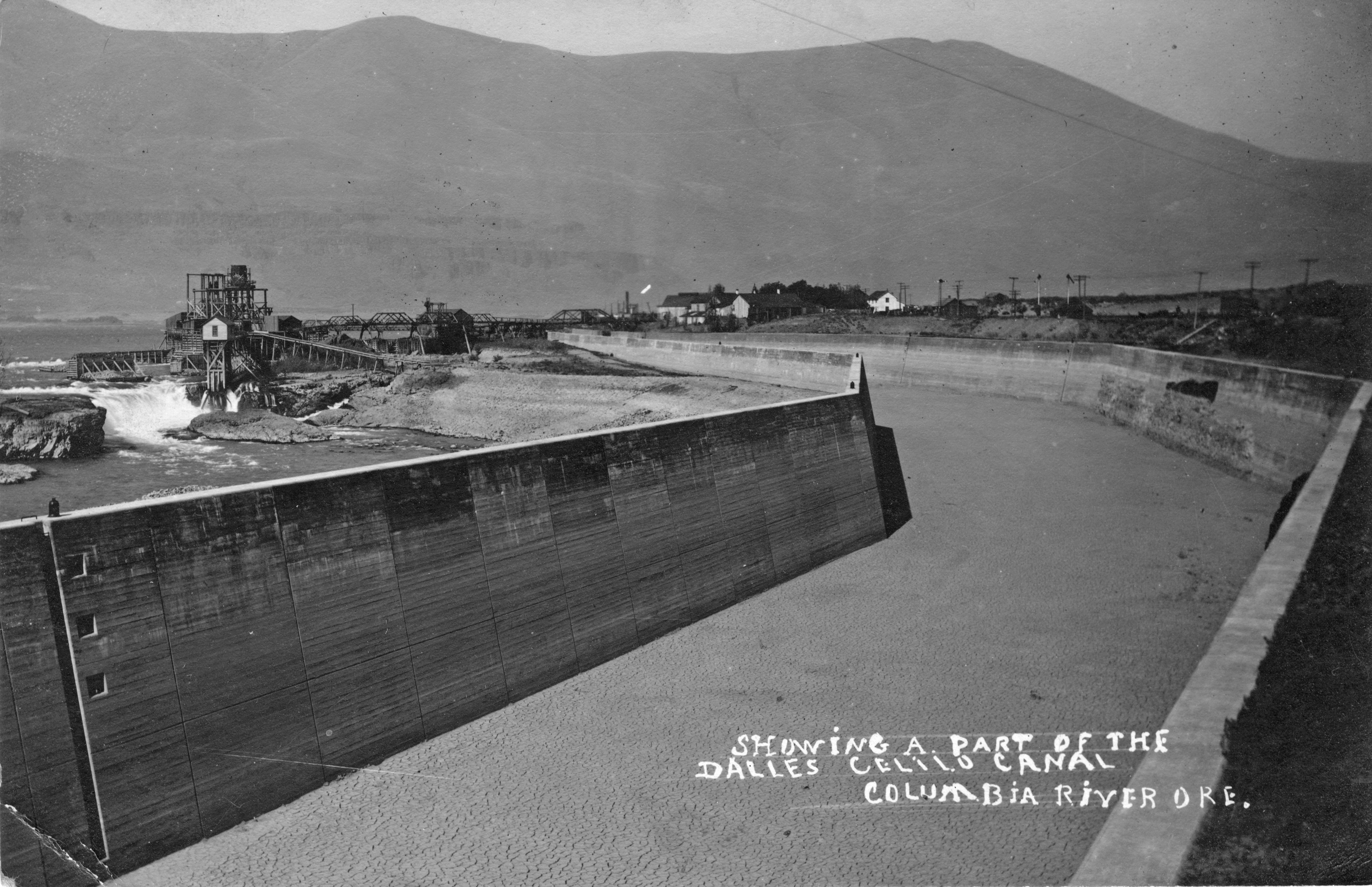
- Celilo Canal in 1910; the Columbia River is visible at left.
- Interactive map of Celilo Canal

Specifications
- Maximum boat beam: 65 ft 0 in (19.8 m)
- Status: inundated by Lake Celilo formed by The Dalles Dam

History
- Principal engineer: Army Engineers
- Construction began: 1905
- Date of first use: May 15, 1915
- Date closed: 1957

Celilo Canal was a canal in Oregon connecting two points of the Columbia River, just east of The Dalles.

In the natural state of the Columbia River, there was an 8-mile (13 km) stretch from The Dalles to Celilo Falls that was impassable upstream and navigable downstream only at high water and at great risk. Celilo Canal was built in the early part of the 1900s to allow steamboat and river-borne traffic to bypass that stretch.

== History and construction ==
In 1858, a 19-mile (31 km)-long wagon road, the Oregon Portage Railroad, had been built around the falls on the south side of the river. This was replaced in 1863 by a 13-mile (21 km)-long portage railway owned by the Oregon Steam Navigation Company. A number of studies and false starts were made towards building a canal around the falls, but construction on what was to become known as the Celilo Canal did not begin until 1905, and then took ten years to complete. In 1909, Scientific American summarized the status of the work and its objectives:

The Columbia River, which is the most important waterway in the western part of the United States, extends a distance of 1,400 miles (2,300 km) from Its mouth to British Columbia, where it has its source. Including its tributaries, it forms a system of waterways available for steamboats and barges aggregating 2,132 miles (3,431 km). This is not continuous, however, for the channel is obstructed at two different points. One of these obstructions is formed by what is called the Cascades, a series of rapids located 60 miles (97 km) from the city of Portland. Here the government built, about twelve years ago, a lock canal. The canal has a depth of 8 feet (2.4 m) and is 3,000 feet (910 m) long, and it contains two locks, each of which is 462 feet (141 m) in length, and capacious enough for much larger craft than pass through it to the upper river. With the aid of the canal, steamers can travel from Portland to what are called the Dalles, a distance of about 200 miles (320 km). Here, however, the natural obstacles are very great, and to overcome them an elaborate engineering scheme Is now being carried out. The river, for a distance of several miles, flows swiftly through a series of gorges which it has cut out of the rock formation in this part of Oregon.

Scientific American was also optimistic about the prospective economic value of the canal:

[A] very large area of Washington and Oregon may be reached by river craft. This area comprises not only an extensive wheat-growing country, but cattle and sheep ranches and fruit farms, as well as an extensive mining district. There are some counties in this region which are entirely destitute of railroads, and their commercial products are hauled from 50 to 75 miles (121 km) to the nearest stations by freighting outfits. As the improvement referred to will allow craft carrying nearly a thousand tons to ply upon the upper Columbia, It must be regarded as one of the most important engineering projects which has yet been undertaken by the government.

The federal government spent 5 million dollars on its construction. For an inaugural cruise, the steamer Undine left Portland April 29 and arrived in Lewiston, May 3, 1915.

== Effect on navigation ==
Boosters of the Celilo Canal organized the Open River Navigation Company, and put the Charles R. Spencer and J.N. Teal on the run from Portland to The Dalles, Twin Cities and Inland Empire on the route up the Snake River, and Relief on the run from Celilo to Pasco, Washington. Mountain Gem supported Relief above Celilo

Once the canal was complete, navigation was open on the Columbia from the mouth of the river all the way to Priest Rapids, and, up the Snake River, to the mouth of the Grande Ronde River near Rogersburg. However, completion of the canal came too late to fend off competition from railroads, which had taken away most of the steamboat's business. Riverine transportation above Celilo never reached the hopes of the proponents of the canal. Only in the late 1930s did the development of wheat barge traffic, eventually driven by diesel towboats, become an important transport method on the Columbia River.

== Current state ==
The canal and all related works were flooded following the completion of The Dalles Dam in 1957.
