= Seufert Park =

Park in Oregon, United States

Coordinates: 45.6106°N 121.12666°W

Seufert County Park is a public park located just east of The Dalles, Oregon, United States, and is operated by the United States Army Corps of Engineers. The park's main attraction is The Dalles Dam Visitor Center where one can view exhibits regarding the history and function of the dam. The park also has picnic tables and a small rose garden.

The park is named after the Seufert family which operated a salmon cannery near the park from the late 19th century until the construction of the dam.
