= Nelson Wallulatum =

Native American chief

Nelson Wallulatum (February 27, 1926 – June 13, 2010) was a Native American chief and leader of the Wasco tribe of Warm Springs, Oregon. He was a serviceman in the US Navy from 1943 to 1945. He was the Wasco representative on the Warm Springs tribal council from 1959 up until his death in 2010.
