= Wishram village =

- Wishram Indian Village Site
- U.S. National Register of Historic Places
- U.S. Historic district
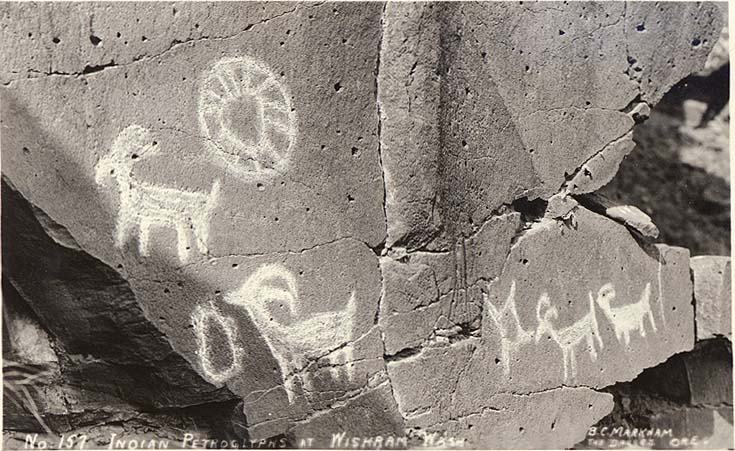
- Petroglyphs at the village site.

- Location within Washington (state)
- Location: Klickitat County, Washington, USA
- Nearest city: The Dalles, Oregon
- Area: 2,930 acres (11.9 km^{2})
- NRHP reference No.: 72001278
- Added to NRHP: March 16, 1972

Wishram Village, referred to as nixlúidix by its residents, was a summer and winter village on the Columbia River, Washington, United States occupied by Upper Chinook people. It is considered the largest prehistoric Chinook village site. The site is now part of Columbia Hills State Park.

== History ==
Located near Five Mile Rapids, the village was located at the far eastern reach of Chinookan lands. Archaeologists believe the site was occupied for about 10,000 years. The village was a common trading site for Indians in the surrounding areas, acting as a link between tribes from the Pacific Coast, and the interior Northwest. The site was visited by nearby Yakamas, as well as those from as far away as the Nez Perce, who would come to trade fish, berries, skins, buffalo, amongst many other items.

The village was visited during the westward journey by Lewis and Clark, and again on their eastward return journey, though by the time of the second visit, the village was at a site about 300 yards (270 m) downstream from the site visited the previous fall. Lewis and Clark estimated that there were about 600 people living at the site during the first visit (October 1805), and around 1,000 during the second visit (April 1806). Clark noted in his journals that there were about 20 wooden houses at the site, near a man-made earthen mound called Wakemup (or Wakamup) Mound.

By the time of the July 1841 visit by the United States Exploring Expedition, United States Navy Lieutenant Charles Wilkes described the village as having forty lodges, and 400 inhabitants.

In 1854, the village was struck by an epidemic of smallpox, which killed 257 residents. Survivors of the epidemic blamed a "medicine-man" for failure to cure the disease, and killed him by putting him on a horse with a noose around his neck.

Around 1860, residents of Wishram began moving to the Yakama Indian Reservation, under treaties signed in 1855, but Indians continued to be allowed to use the site for fishing. Until 1957, the village located at the site was referred to as Spearfish, which was flooded by the creation of The Dalles Dam.

=== Wakemap Mound ===
Wakemap Mound is a mound at the site that measures roughly 350 feet (110 m) long, by 270 feet (82 m) wide, and 20 feet (6.1 m) deep. The site is now surrounded by water caused by the construction of The Dalles Dam.

== Sources ==
- Boyd, Robert (1996). People of the Dalles: The Indians of Wascopam Mission, University of Nebraska Press.
- Oregon Archaeological Society (1959). Wakemap Mound, Binford and Mort.
- Ruby, Robert H.; Brown, John Arthur. A Guide to the Indian Tribes of the Pacific Northwest, University of Oklahoma Press.
- Samson, Karl (2008). Frommer's Washington State, Frommer's.
- Spranger, Michael S. (1996). Columbia Gorge: A Unique American Treasure, DIANE Publishing.
