= Wasco–Wishram =

Two Chinook Indian tribes in Oregon, US

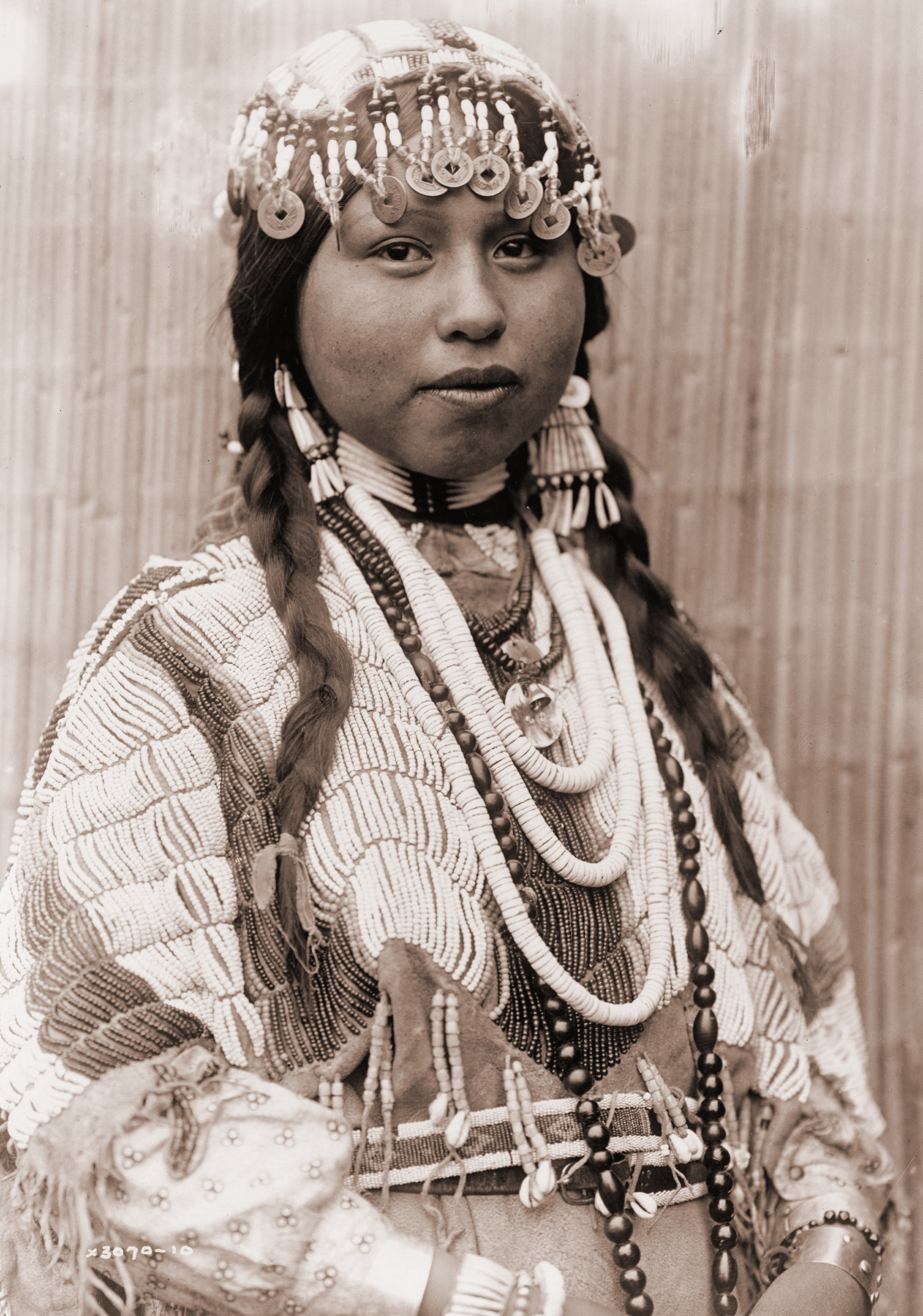
Wishram woman in bridal garb, 1910. Photo by Edward Curtis

The Wasco-Wishram are two closely related Chinook Indian tribes from the Columbia River in Oregon. Today the tribes are part of the Confederated Tribes of Warm Springs living in the Warm Springs Indian Reservation in Oregon and Confederated Tribes and Bands of the Yakama Nation living in the Yakama Indian Reservation in Washington.

== History ==
The Wishram and Wasco are Plateau tribes that are closely related and share many cultural aspects of the Northwest Coast tribes. They lived along the banks of the Columbia River, near The Dalles. The Dalles was a prime trading location, and the tribes benefited from a vast trade network. United States military expansion in the 1800s brought European diseases, which took a great toll on the Wasco and Wishram populations. Both tribes were forced by the United States in 1855 to sign treaties ceding the majority of their lands. These treaties established the Warm Springs Reservation.

=== Wasco ===
Wasco comes from the word Wacq!ó, meaning "cup" or "small bowl," the name of a distinctive bowl-shaped rock near the tribe's primary historic village. They traditionally lived on the south bank of the Columbia River. In 1822, their population was estimated to be 900. They were divided into three subtribes: the Dalles Wasco or Wasco proper (a.k.a. the Ki-gal-twal-la) on the south side of the Columbia River near The Dalles in Wasco County), the Hood River Wasco (on the Hood River or Dog River to its mouth into the Columbia River; Lewis and Clark grouped them with the White Salmon River Band and named them Smock-Shop Band of Chil-luck-kit-te-quaw, but they were two separate groups: White Salmon River Band in Washington and Hood River Band in Oregon, called Ninuhltidih (Curtis) or Kwikwulit (Mooney) and the Cascades Indians or Watlala (downstream from the other Wasco groups, two groups, one on each side of the Columbia River; the Oregon group were called Gahlawaihih [Curtis]). The Watlala, whose dialect is the most divergent dialect of the Wasco, may have been a separate tribe though identified as Wasco since 1830.

=== Wishram ===
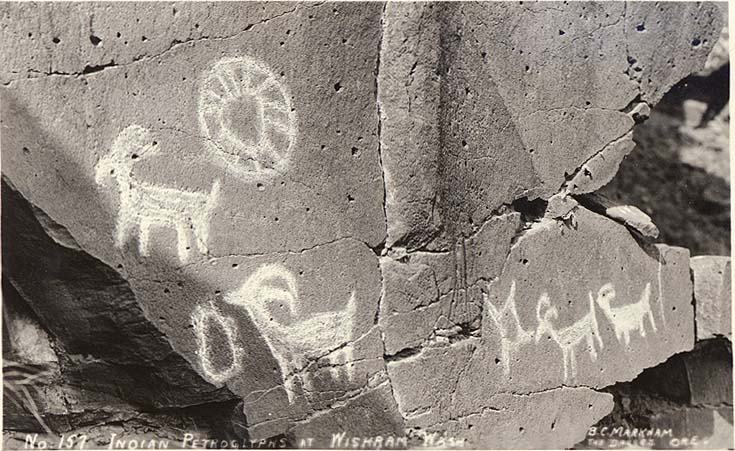
Wishram petroglyphs on the Columbia River

The Wishram are known as the Tlakluit and Echeloot. They traditionally settled in permanent villages along the north banks of the Columbia River. In the 1700s, the estimated Wishram population was 1,500. In 1962 only 10 Wishrams were counted on the Washington census. Their main summer and winter village on the Columbia River, Washington, was Wishram village, referred to as Nixlúidix by its residents. It is considered the largest prehistoric Chinook village site. The site is now part of Columbia Hills State Park. Located near Five Mile Rapids, the village was located at the far eastern reach of Chinookan lands. The village and the name for its people as ″Wishram″ comes from the neighboring Sahaptin-speaking tribes, which called the village Wɨ́šx̣am/Wɨ́šx̣aa - ″Spearfish″, and its people therefore Wɨ́šx̣amma - ″Wishram people″.

=== Fishing rights ===
The 1855 treaties signed by the Wasco-Wishram provide for the tribes to fish "at all ... usual and accustomed stations in common with the citizens of the United States..." Between 1938 and 1956, the Bonneville Dam, Grand Coulee Dam, and The Dalles Dam all wreaked havoc upon native fisheries. The government paid money to the tribes to compensate the loss of fish; however, that provided no compensation for the cultural and religious importance that fishing for salmon and steelhead held for the tribe. In 1974 a landmark court case confirmed the rights of Northwest Coast tribes to fish as they have historically done.

== Today ==
The Confederated Tribes of Warm Springs of Oregon have 4,000 enrolled tribal members that are Wasco, Walla Walla, Tenino (Warm Springs), and Paiute. 200 of these 4,000 are estimated to be Wasco. Wishram are predominantly enrolled in the Confederated Tribes and Bands of the Yakama Nation in Washington state.

=== Language ===
The Wasco-Wishram language is part of the Upper Chinookan or Kiksht division of the Chinookan language family, itself a branch of the proposed Penutian language family. Currently, there have been no fluent speakers since 2012. The tribe has a language program to revive its use among tribal members of all ages.

=== Art ===
Both tribes are known for their intricate wood carving, beadwork, and basketry. Wasco-Tlingit artist Pat Courtney Gold takes traditional Wasco-Wishram designs and weaves them into contemporary baskets.

== See also ==
- Chinookan
- Confederated Tribes of Warm Springs
- Nelson Wallulatum, Wasco chief
- Wasco-Wishram language
- Wishram village
- Billy Chinook
