= Tenino people =

Native American tribe of the Pacific Northwest

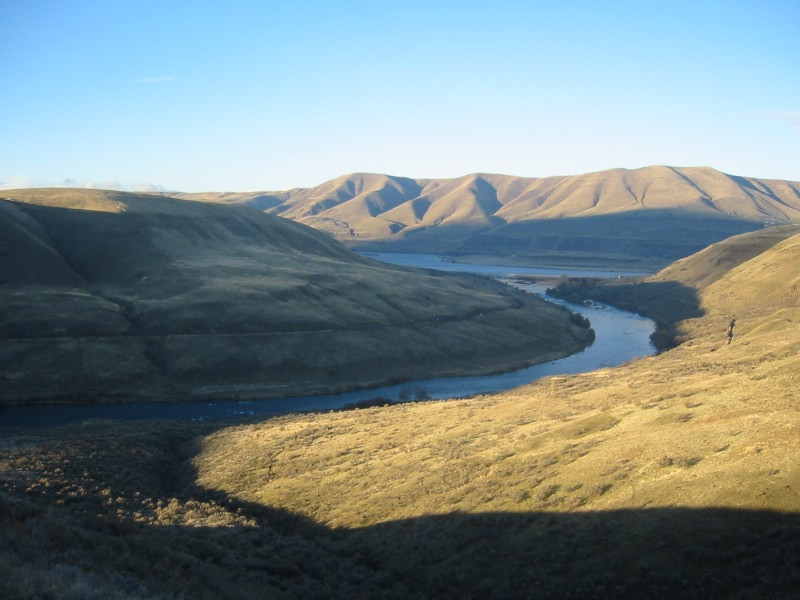
The Deschutes River at the confluence of the Columbia, part of the historic homeland of the Tenino people.

The Tenino people, commonly known today as the Warm Springs bands, are several Sahaptin Native American subtribes which historically occupied territory located in the North-Central portion of the American state of Oregon. The Tenino people included four localized subtribes — the Tygh (Taih, Tyigh) or "Upper Deschutes" divided in Tayxɫáma (Tygh Valley), Tiɫxniɫáma (Sherar's Bridge) and Mliɫáma (present Warm Spring Reservation), the Wyam (Wayámɫáma) (Wayámpam) or "Lower Deschutes", also known as "Celilo Indians", the Dalles Tenino or "Tinainu (Tinaynuɫáma)", also known as "Tenino proper"; and the Dock-Spus (Tukspush) (Takspasɫáma) or "John Day."

Historically splitting their time between winter camps and summer camps on the Columbia River, in 1855 the Tenino people were made a party to the Treaty with the Tribes of Middle Oregon, which was negotiated by Oregon Superintendent of Indian Affairs Joel Palmer. The Warm Springs bands are today a part of the Confederated Tribes of Warm Springs, which governs the Warm Springs Indian Reservation in Central Oregon.

== History ==
=== Description ===
The Tenino people, commonly known today as the Warm Springs bands, comprised four local subtribes:

- the Tinainu (Tinaynuɫáma), or Dalles Tenino: occupied two closely adjacent summer villages on the south bank of the Dalles of the Columbia River / Fivemile Rapids (Fivemile Rapids Site) and a winter village at Eightmile Creek (named from its distance, eight miles from The Dalles); the name of the larger summer village, ″tinainu″, was applied both to this local subtribe as to the whole Tenino people.
- the Tygh (Tayxɫáma), or "Upper Deschutes": their principal summer village was at the Upper Deschutes River and their principal winter village at the site of today's Tygh Valley, Oregon; they were divided into three local village groups - the dominant Tayxɫáma (at Tygh Valley), the Tiɫxniɫáma (Sherar's Bridge below Sherars Falls) and the Mliɫáma (along Warm Springs River on present Warm Springs Indian Reservation).
- the Wyam (Wayámɫáma) or "Lower Deschutes", also known as "Celilo Indians": their summer village was at Celilo Falls known to the Native Sahaptin people as Wyam ("echo of falling water" or "sound of water upon the rocks") on the south bank of Columbia River and their winter village on the left bank of the Lower Deschutes River just above its junction with the Columbia River (another source locates the winter village Wanwa'wi on the west bank of Deschutes River immediately south of the confluence with the Columbia.)
- the Dock-Spus / Tukspush (Takspasɫáma), or "John Day": had two summer villages on the south bank of the Columbia River and occupied the Lower John Day River with twin winter villages on either sides of the named river.

These bands split their time between inland winter villages close to water and fuel supplies and summer camps with rich fisheries located on the south bank of the Columbia River in today's North-Central Oregon.

The Tenino people spoke a dialect of the Sahaptin language, a tongue shared by the neighboring Umatilla people located to the East. Other neighboring tribal entities spoke other languages, including the Wasco and Wishram, located to the Northwest, who spoke a dialect of the Chinookan language, the Molala people across the Cascade Range to the West, who spoke Waiilatpuan, and the Northern Paiute to the South, who spoke a variant of Shoshoni.

The Tenino people historically recalled only one great war with other Columbia River peoples, a victorious battle with the Molala which forced the latter to the other side of the Cascade Mountains. One brief battle was also fought with the Klamath, a group which was otherwise a valuable trading partner. The tribe did have a historic enemy in the Northern Paiute, however, with conflict between the two groups characterized anthropologist G.P. Murdock as having been "endemic."

=== Economics ===
Up to the 19th Century the Warm Springs bands were semi-nomadic peoples, engaging neither agriculture nor the raising of domesticated food animals. The fishing of salmon, the hunting of game animals, and the gathering of wild foodstuffs were essential activities of the tribal bands. Labor was differentiated on the basis of gender, with men doing the hunting and most of the fishing. Men also produced all implements from stone, bone, or horn and were responsible for felling trees and stockpiling firewood. Men produced the dugout canoes used for river transport and constructed the permanent winter dwellings.

Women preserved the meat and fish for later use by drying or smoking and engaged in most of the work in collecting plant-based foods, which included berries and other fruit, roots, acorns, and pine nuts. Women also cooked the food in each family group and produced, repaired, and laundered clothing and bedding. Women also produced thread, rope, baskets, bags, and mats.

Women also were primarily responsible for the conduct of trade with visitors from other tribal groups, while in the late summer and into the fall parties of men periodically set out to trade with others. Trade exports of the Tenino people included dried salmon, fish oil, and animal furs. Imported products included baskets, horses, slaves, buffalo hides, feathers, and shells.

The Warm Springs bands did not live communally, but rather divided themselves into family groups, each of which had its own dwellings. In the winter villages, occupied each year from approximately November to March, each family had two houses — an oval dugout lodge covered with earth that was used for sleeping and a rectangular dwelling built above ground which was covered with mats and used for cooking and other daytime activities. In the summer months, generally April through October, the band would relocate to the river, where families would construct rectangular temporary dwellings with poles and mats. These were divided, with half used for sleeping while the other half was used as a covered area for the processing of salmon for later use.

=== Culture ===
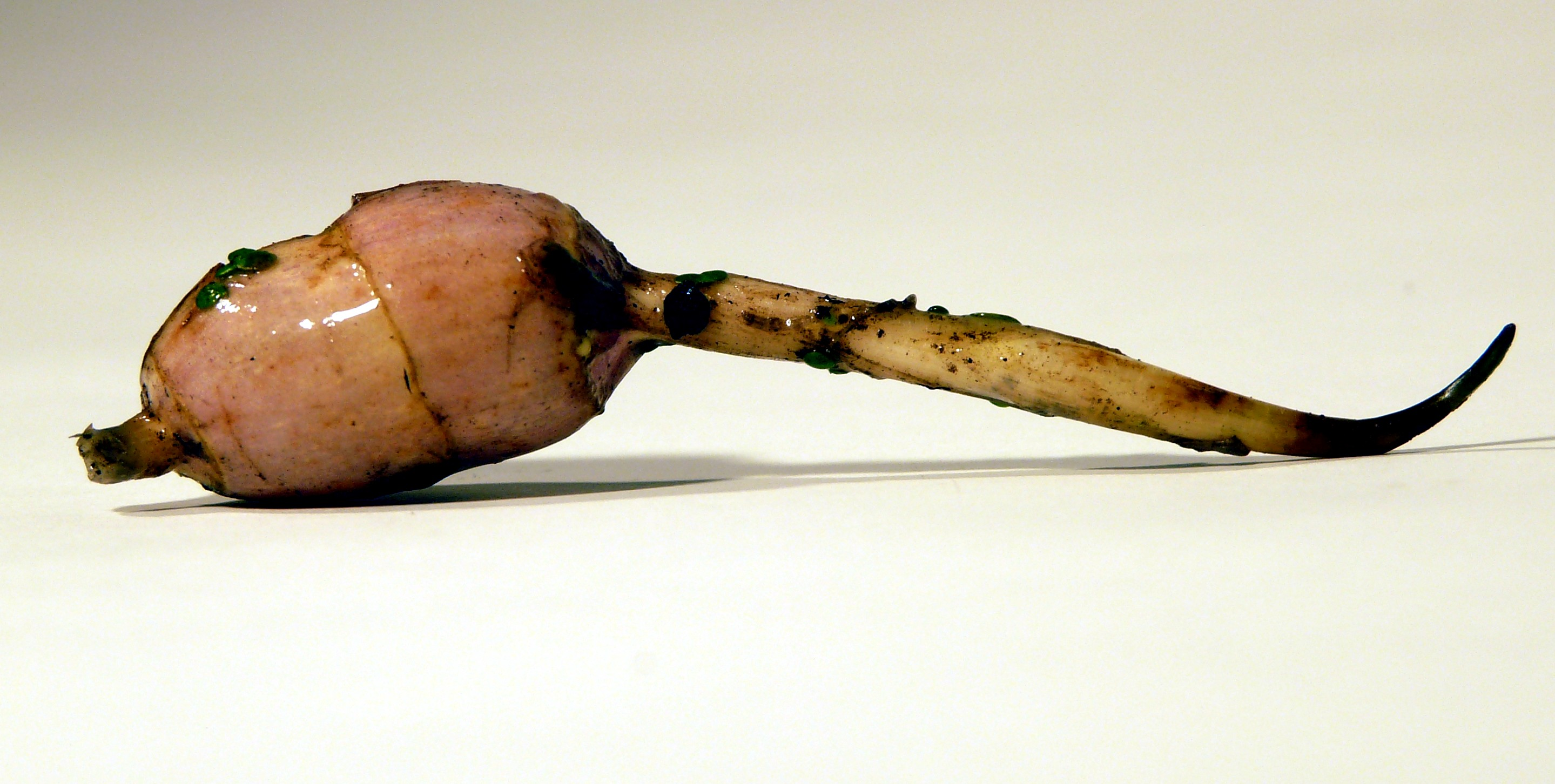
Bulb of a wapato plant, observed by the Lewis and Clark party as a staple food of the Native American peoples of the middle Columbia River.

The Tenino people participated in regular festivals related to the obtaining of the first foods of the new year. Each April a ceremonial party would be sent out to catch fish and gather wapato roots for a large festival celebrated collectively at the Dalles Tenino village by all tribal members except for the Dock-Spus band, which celebrated separately. This ritual of the First Fish was common to most of the Native American peoples of the Pacific Northwest coast and Columbia River plateau.

Typically with First Fish rituals of the region, one versed in specific verbal incantations was called upon to make use of his skill to catch the ceremonial fish. The fish was never to touch the ground, but was laid upon a mat made of reeds and butchered with a traditional knife before being cooked in a prescribed manner and shared by designated members of the tribal group. After being consumed, the bones were to be thrown directly back into the water so that they would not be consumed by dogs or other carnivores and the meal was to be followed by traditional songs and dances. It was commonly believed that the soul of the First Fish would return downstream to other salmon and relate the respectful way in which it was captured and eaten, thereby inspiring other salmon to travel upstream to be treated with the same honor and respect.

Following this festival about half the families in the village departed on a hunting expedition to the south, while the rest remained at the summer village on the river, catching and drying fish.

Each July the entire community congregated again, this time to partake of berries and venison in another summer foods celebration. Following this festival the community would again divide, with half remaining to catch and smoke salmon while the others departed to gather nuts and berries and to hunt. Reeds would be gathered for the manufacture of mats in October, followed by the disbanding of the temporary summer village and a return to the permanent winter village further inland.

=== Interaction with European-Americans ===
The Tenino people were first noted by the Lewis and Clark Expedition late in October 1805, when several members of the band were recruited to help the Corps to port their boats and equipment around the impassable Celilo Falls. A full day was spent moving these supplies, while entertained onlookers gathered to witness the spectacle.

Near Celilo Falls explorer William Clark observed the traditional drying method used for the preservation of salmon:

"After being sufficiently dried it is pounded between two stones fine, and put into a species of basket neatly made of grass and rushes better than two feet long and one foot diameter, which basket is lined with the skin of salmon stretched and dried for the purpose. In this it is pressed down as hard as possible. When full they secure the open part with fish skins across which they fasten through the loops of the basket...very securely, and then on a dry situation they set those baskets, the corded part up. Their common custom is to set 7 as close as they can stand and 5 on top of them, and secure them with mats which [are] wrapped around them and made fast with cords and covered with mats. Those 12 baskets of from 90 to 100 lbs. each form a stack. Thus preserved those fish may be kept sound and sweet several years, as those people inform me. Great quantities as they inform us are sold to the whites people who visit the mouth of this [Columbia] river as well as to the natives below."

=== Establishment of Warm Springs Reservation ===
A Tenino or Wasco woman and her children at the Warm Springs Reservation, 1907.

On June 25, 1855, the United States Government established the Warm Springs Indian Reservation as part of a treaty with the four bands of the Tenino people as well as three of the bands of the neighboring Wasco. The Dalles Tenino, Tygh, Wyam, and Dock-Spus were effectively forced from their historic homelands to the new reservation in 1857, with the Wasco bands and other Chinookan-speaking neighbors following in 1858. According to the 1858-59 report of the reservation, some 850 Tenino individuals had been relocated there by that date, with another 160 members of the Wyam and Dock-Spus bands not yet relocated.

This new reservation was located on lands historically belonging to the Northern Paiute, and for several years afterwards this band retaliated against their historic enemies by conducting raids for horses and other forms of plunder.

In addition to the reservation the Tenino people have a right by treaty to use the lands around Government Camp, Oregon on Mount Hood. The Mt. Hood Tribal Heritage Center, named Wiwnu Wash, opened at the Mount Hood Skibowl in 2012.

=== Tenino people today ===
Today the Warm Springs bands are a part of the Confederated Tribes of Warm Springs. As the 20th Century came to a close the Confederated Tribes of the Warm Springs counted a total membership of 3,405, including descendants of the Tenino, Wasco, and Northern Paiute tribal groups.

== See also ==
- Native American peoples of Oregon
- Sahaptin peoples
- Pacific Northwest Indian wars
- Tenino, Washington
