= Sahaptin =

Ethnic group

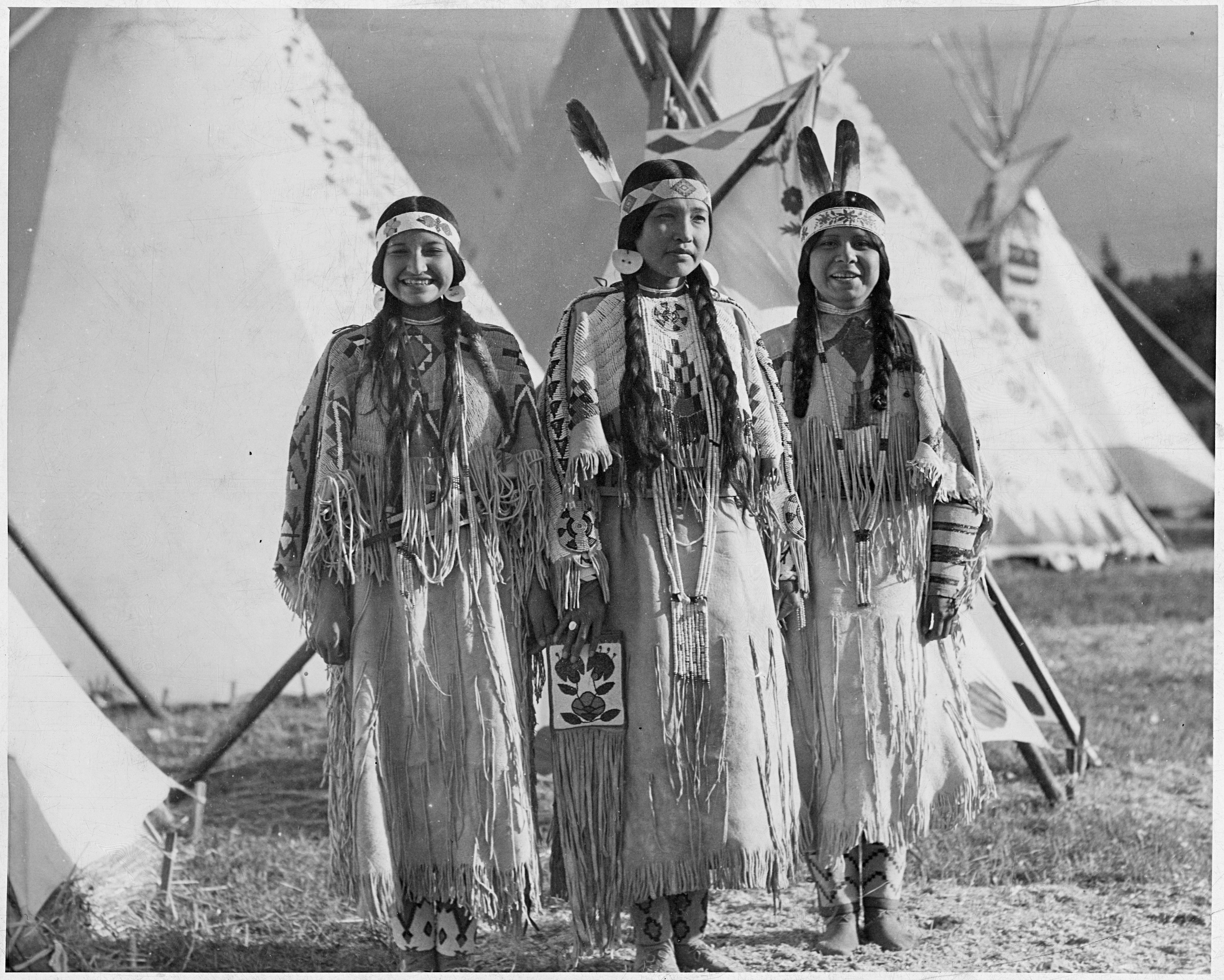
Yakama women in 1911

The Sahaptin are a number of Native American tribes who speak dialects of the Sahaptin language. The Sahaptin tribes inhabited territory along the Columbia River and its tributaries in the Pacific Northwest region of the United States. Sahaptin-speaking peoples included the Klickitat, Kittitas, Yakama, Wanapum, Palus, Lower Snake, Skinpah, Walla Walla, Umatilla, Tenino, and Nez Perce.

== Territory ==
According to early written accounts, Sahaptin-speaking peoples inhabited the southern portion of the Columbia Basin in Washington and Oregon. Villages were concentrated along the Columbia River, from the Cascades Rapids to near Vantage, Washington, and along the Snake River from the mouth to close to the Idaho border. The closely related Nez Perce tribe lived to the east. There were additional villages along tributaries, including the Yakima, Deschutes, and Walla Walla rivers. Several villages were located west of the Cascade mountains in southern Washington, including those of the Upper Cowlitz tribe, and some of the Klickitat. The western portion of Sahaptin territory was shared with Chinookan tribes.

== Heritage ==
They are of the Shahaptian linguistic stock, to which belong also the Nez Perce, with whom they maintained close friendly relations. They frequently competed with the Salishan-speaking tribes on their northern border, including the Flathead, Coeur d'Alene and Spokane. They were chronically at war with the Blackfeet, Crow, and Shoshoni on the east and south.

They call themselves Ni Mii Puu, meaning simply "the people", or "we the people". The name Sahaptin or Saptin was a term given by the Salishan tribes and adopted by European Americans. When Lewis and Clark came through the area in 1805, these people were called Chopunnish, possibly another form of Saptin. The popular and official name of the Nez Percé, "Pierced Noses", was originally given to the people by French-Canadian trappers. The term referred to the people's former custom of wearing a dentalium shell through a hole bored in the septum of the nose.

In 1805 the Sahaptin numbered, according to the most reliable estimates, probably over 6,000. Through the 19th century, their numbers declined sharply, due largely to mortality from new infectious diseases. Contributing causes were incessant wars with the more powerful Blackfeet in earlier years; a wasting fever, and measles epidemic (1847) from contact with immigrants; smallpox and other infectious diseases following the occupation of the country by miners after 1860; losses in the war of 1877 and subsequent removals; and wholesale spread of consumption because of outside contact. In 1848 they were officially estimated at 3,000; by 1910 they were officially reported at 1,530.

== Culture ==
The clan system was unknown. Chiefs were elective rather than hereditary, governing by assistance of the council. Their bands were decentralized and there was no supreme tribal chief.

=== Accommodations ===
Their permanent houses were communal structures, sometimes circular, but more often oblong, about 20 feet (6.1 m) in width and 60 to 90 feet (18 to 27 m) in length, with a framework of poles covered by rush mats. In the interior, the floor was dug below the ground level, and earth banked up around the sides for insulation. An open space in the centre of the roof, allowed for the escape of smoke. On the inside were ranged fires along the centre at a distance of 10 to 12 feet (3.0 to 3.7 m) apart, each fire serving two families on opposite sides of the house, the family sections being sometimes separated by mat curtains. One house might shelter more than one hundred persons. Lewis and Clark mention one large enough to accommodate nearly fifty families. On temporary expeditions, they raised buffalo-skin tipis or brush shelters.

They also used sweat-houses and menstrual lodges. The permanent sweat-house was a shallow subterranean excavation, roofed with poles and earth and bedded with grass. The young and unmarried men slept here during the winter season. They occasionally performed sweat ceremonies by steam produced by pouring water upon hot stones placed in the centre.

There were also temporary sweat-houses, used in turn by both sexes. It had a framework of willow rods, covered with blankets, and heated stones were brought inside from fires. The menstrual lodge was constructed for the seclusion of women during the menstrual period, and for a short period before and after childbirth. It was a subterranean structure, considerably larger than the sweat-house, and entered by means of a ladder from above. The occupants cooked their meals alone and were not allowed to touch any articles used by outsiders, because of beliefs about the power of blood.

Furniture consisted chiefly of bed platforms. The women made varieties of baskets and bags woven of rushes or grass, and used wooden mortars for pounding roots. They used no pottery. They made spoons of horn from deer or bison. The woman had a digging stick for gathering roots, which they were given in a rite of adulthood. The women also processed and tanned animal skins, sewing and decorating them for clothing. The women wore a fez-shaped basket hat.

The men conducted hunting and fishing, and were armed with a bow and arrows, lance (stone or silver strung to willow branch), shield, and fishing equipment. A protective skin helmet was fashioned for warriors.

=== Food ===
Sahaptins, although semi-sedentary, were traditionally hunter-gatherers. The women gathered and processed many wild roots and berries, sometimes combining them with cooked meats and drying the mixture. Aside from fish and game, chiefly salmon and deer, their principal foods were the roots of the camas (Camassia quamash) and kouse (Lomatium cous). The camas roots were roasted in pits. Kouse was ground in mortars and molded into cakes for future use. Women were primarily responsible for the gathering and preparing of these root crops.

=== Religion ===
Marriage occurred at about the age of fourteen. The ceremony was accompanied by communal feasting and giving of presents. Polygamy was general, but kinship prohibition was enforced. They had a patriarchal kinship system, with inheritance in the male line. "The standard of morality, both before and after marriage seems to have been conspicuously high" (Spinden).

Interment was in the ground, and the personal belongings of the deceased were deposited with the body. The dwelling was torn down or removed to another spot. The new house was ceremonially purified and the ghost exorcised. The end of the official mourning period was marked with a funeral feast. Sickness and death, especially of children, were frequently ascribed to the work of ghosts.

The religion was animistic, with a marked absence of elaborate myth or ritual. The principal religious event in the life of the boy or girl was the dream vigil. After solitary fasting for several days, the child was encouraged to have a vision of the spirit animal that was to be his or her tutelary through life. Dreams were the great source of spiritual instruction, and children were taught how to interpret and understand them. The principal ceremonial was the dance to the tutelary spirit, next to which in importance was the scalp dance.

Trading posts were first established in the upper Columbia region. Catholic Canadian and Iroquois employees of the Hudson's Bay Company passed on some ideas about Christianity to the Nez Percés. By 1820 both they and the Flathead had voluntarily adopted many of the Catholic forms.

The Flathead Indians appealed for missionaries. A Presbyterian mission was established in 1837 among the Nez Percés at Lapwai, near the present Lewiston, Idaho, by Reverend Henry H. Spalding. Two years later, he set up a printing press and published some small pamphlets in the native language. Regular Catholic work in the same region began with the advent of Fathers François Norbert Blanchet and Modeste Demers along the Columbia in 1838). Father Pierre-Jean De Smet, assigned from St. Louis, Missouri, and other Jesuits operated in the Flathead country beginning in 1840.

The establishment of the Oregon Trail through the country of the Nez Percé and allied tribes resulted in the passage of many more European Americans and introduction of an epidemic disease. Frantic because of the many deaths they suffered, the Cayuse held Dr. Whitman of the Presbyterian mission as responsible. They killed the minister, his wife and eleven others.

When the Catholic Bishop Brouillet arrived, who had intended to meet with Whitman about purchase of the mission property, he was allowed to bury the dead. He warned Spaulding so that he could leave the area and reach safety. Because of the troubles, all the Presbyterian missions in the Columbia region were discontinued. Missionary work resumed in later years, and many of the Nez Percé became Presbyterian.

The Catholic work in the tribe was given in charge of the Jesuits, aided by the Sisters of Saint Joseph, and centering at St. Joseph's mission, Slickpoo, Idaho. For fifty years it was conducted by Joseph Cataldo, S.J., who gave attention also to the neighbouring tribes. The Catholic Indians were reported in the early 20th century at over 500.

== Treaties and conflict ==
In 1855 they sold by treaty a large part of their territory. In the general outbreak of 1855–56, sometimes designated as the Yakima War, the Nez Percés, almost alone, remained friendly to the Americans.

In 1863, in consequence of the discovery of gold, another treaty was negotiated between Nez Percés chief Lawyer (whose band had converted to Christianity and was assimilating to white culture) and General Oliver O. Howard of the U.S. Army. Lawyer ceded all their land but the Lapwai reservation. Chief Joseph of the Wallowa band refused to sign the new treaty, stating that the Treaty of 1855 was promised to be the rule of law for "as long as the sun shines," and was supposedly to protect their home land from white intrusion. Since Nez Percés custom dictated that no single chief spoke for all others, when Joseph and others (including Toohoolhoolzote and Looking Glass) refused to sign the treaty, it was done so with the understanding that the U.S. Government was still bound by their original agreement. Only Lawyer's band would be bound by the new treaty that only they signed.

But, General Howard reportedly gathered numerous other Nez Percé to make their "X" on the document, to give the appearance that Joseph and the other chiefs had signed the treaty. In the eyes of the U.S. government, they would also be subject to its terms.

Chief Joseph steadfastly refused to be a party to the treaty or to its terms, relenting only when it became clear that the survival of his people depended on it. But as they made the arduous trek out of their home land and to the new reservation, a small group of young Nez Percés warriors broke off and killed numerous white settlers along the Salmon River.

These events were the catalyst for the Nez Percés war (1877). After successfully holding in check for some months the regular Army troops and a large force of Indian scouts, Joseph, Looking Glass, and other chiefs conducted a retreat to the north for over a thousand miles across the mountains. They were intercepted by the US Army and forced to surrender within a short distance of the Canadian frontier. Despite the promise that he should be returned to his own country, Joseph and the remnant of his band were deported to Indian Territory (now Oklahoma). So many died that in 1885 the few who survived were transferred to the Colville Reservation in eastern Washington. Throughout the entire retreat, Joseph's warriors committed no outrages. The main portion of the tribe took no part in the war.

In 1893 the communal land of the Lapwai reservation was distributed to heads of household of the tribe under the Dawes Act. Remaining lands were opened for sale to white settlers, depriving the Nez Percé of their land.

== See also ==
- Sahaptin language
