= Columbia Hills State Park =

State park in Washington (state), United States

Columbia Hills Historical State Park
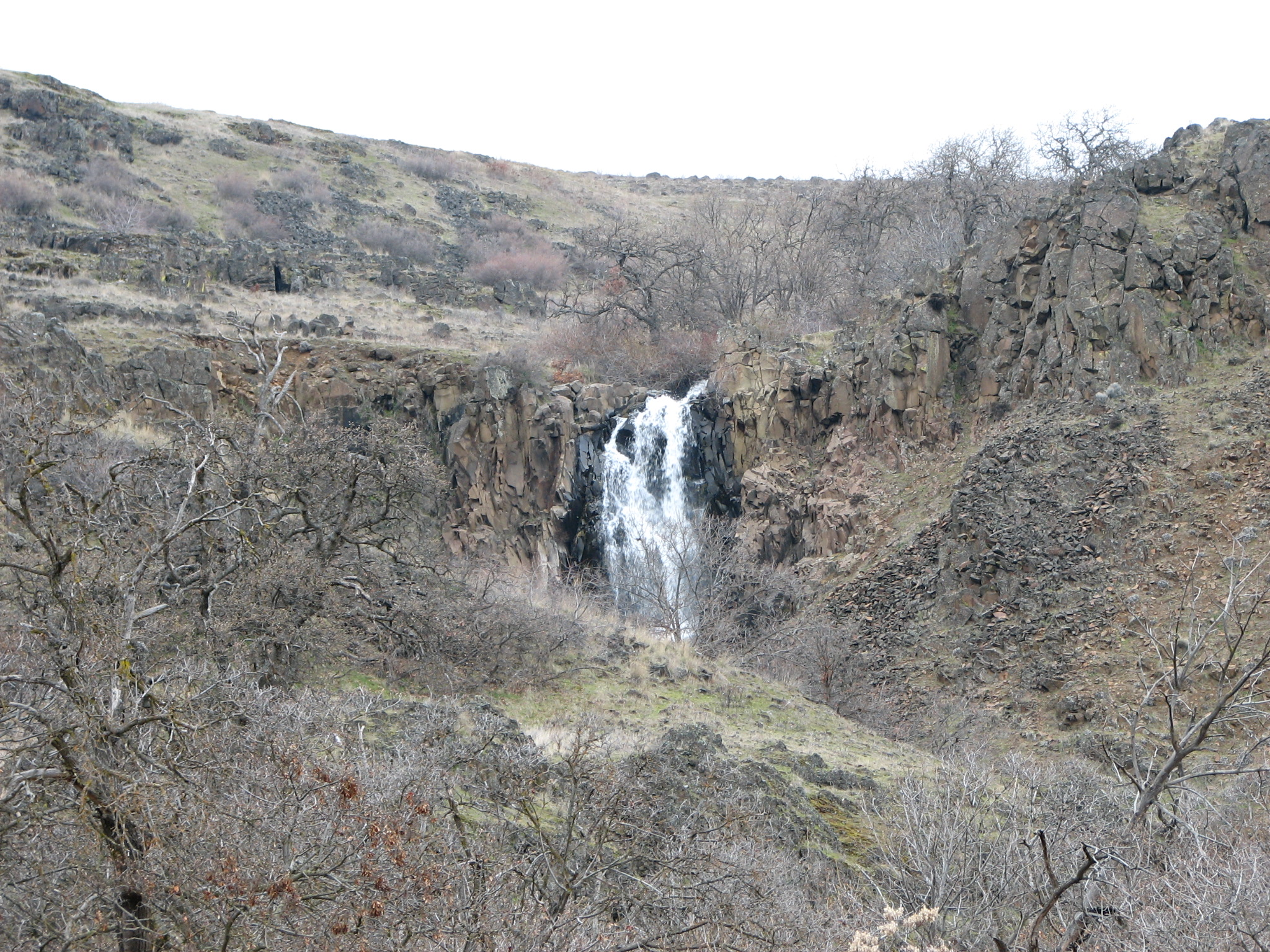

- Location within Washington (state) Location within the United States
- Location: Klickitat County, Washington, United States
- Coordinates: 45°38′58″N 121°05′45″W
- Area: 3,338 acres (1,351 ha)
- Elevation: 466 ft (142 m)
- Established: 2003
- Administrator: Washington State Parks and Recreation Commission
- Visitors: 230,637 (in 2024)
- Website: Official website

Columbia Hills Historical State Park is a Washington public recreation area located 6 miles (9.7 km) east of Dallesport on SR 14 in Klickitat County. The state park occupies 3,338 acres (1,351 ha) on Horsethief Lake, an impoundment of the Columbia River. It was created in 2003 with the merger of Horsethief Lake State Park and Dalles Mountain Ranch.

== Activities and amenities ==
Park activities include camping, boating, picnicking, fishing, swimming, windsurfing, rock climbing, and hiking on 12 miles (19 km) of trails. Several petroglyph panels that were saved from inundation by the nearby Dalles Dam have been installed in the park.
