= Celilo Village, Oregon =

Unincorporated community in Oregon, United States

Coordinates: 45°38′41″N 120°57′59″W

Location of Celilo Village

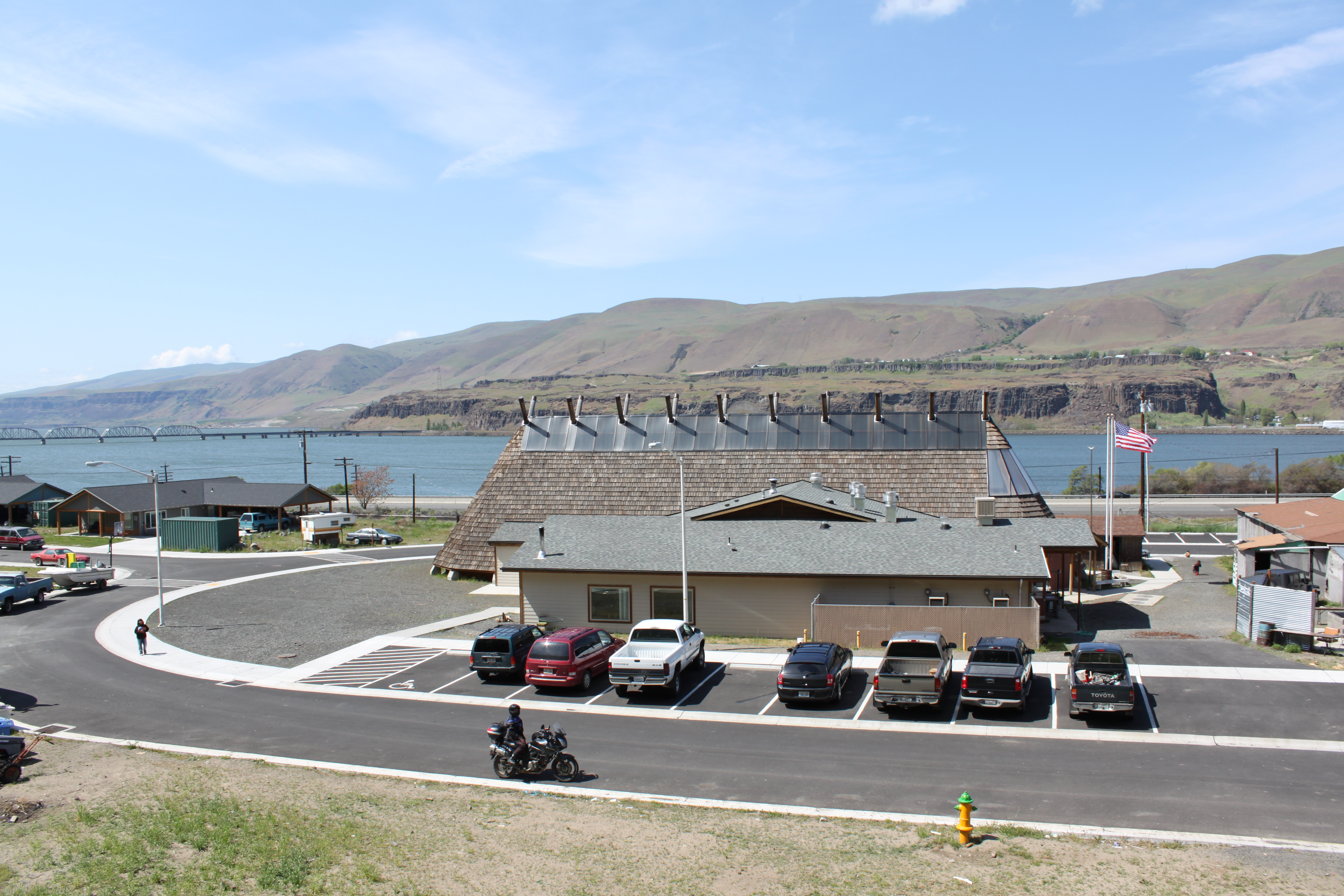
Modern Native American Longhouse in Celilo Village with the Columbia River and Oregon Trunk Rail Bridge in the background

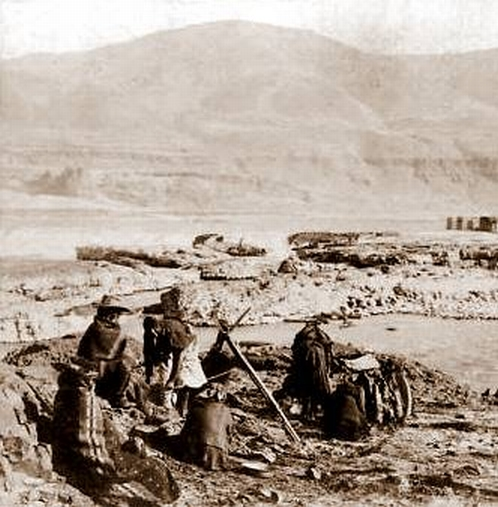
Native Americans drying salmon at Celilo Falls, circa 1900

Celilo Village, Oregon is an unincorporated Native American community on the Columbia River in northeastern Wasco County in the U.S. state of Oregon. It is near Lake Celilo, the former site of Celilo Falls; it is just south of the community of Wishram, Washington, across the Columbia River.

In 2003 about 100 permanent residents lived in 14 dwellings. The site was once a major cultural and trading center, until Celilo Falls was inundated by The Dalles Dam in 1957. The 2000 census reported a total resident population of 44 persons living on a land area of 102.11 acres (0.4132 km^{2}). The United States Army Corps of Engineers provided funding for construction of a new tribal long house in 2006. The Corps of Engineers built and maintains the dams that have annihilated the salmon runs upon which Native ceremonial, commercial and dietary life depend.

Most residents of Celilo are members of either the Yakama Nation or Confederated Tribes of Warm Springs. Some may be members of the Confederated Tribes of the Umatilla Indian Reservation, or the Nez Perce tribe. Many residents are fishers engaging in ceremonial, subsistence, and commercial fisheries for salmon, steelhead, and sturgeon in the Columbia River. While the historic fishing site at Celilo Falls is gone, there is an "in lieu" fishing site provided by the Army Corps of Engineers after litigation with the Tribes against the COE, that maintains access for tribal members to the river. Most tribal fishing is done currently with gillnets or from platforms built along the river.
