= Lake Celilo =

- Location within Oregon Location within Washington (state) Location within the United States
- Location: Oregon–Washington border, United States
- Coordinates: 45°43′34.73″N 120°41′39.79″W
- Lake type: reservoir
- Primary inflows: Columbia River
- Primary outflows: Columbia River
- Basin countries: United States

Lake Celilo is a 24 mi (39 km) long reservoir on the Columbia River in the United States, between the U.S. states of Washington and Oregon. It was created in 1957 with the construction of The Dalles Dam near The Dalles, Oregon, and stretches upstream to the John Day Dam. Its filling drowned the former site of Celilo Falls and the neighboring fishing and trade village sites. Celilo Village, a small, unincorporated community of Native Americans, still exists today, though it is no longer the thriving cultural and economic center it once was.

The reservoir lies in parts of Wasco and Sherman counties in Oregon, and Klickitat County in Washington.

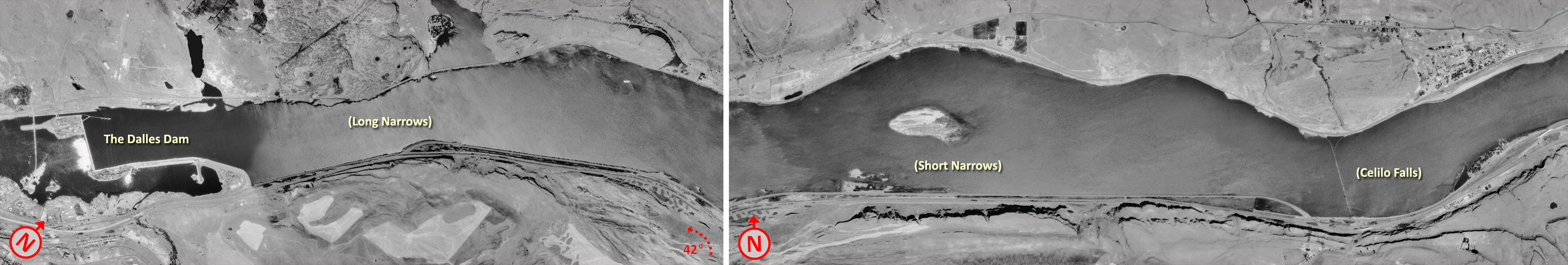
An aerial view of Lake Celilo displaying the historical location of Celilo Falls and the Short and Long Narrows.

== See also ==
- List of lakes in Oregon
- List of hydroelectric dams on the Columbia River
