= Celilo Falls =

Historical waterfall on the Columbia River in the U.S.

- Wyam (Tenino)
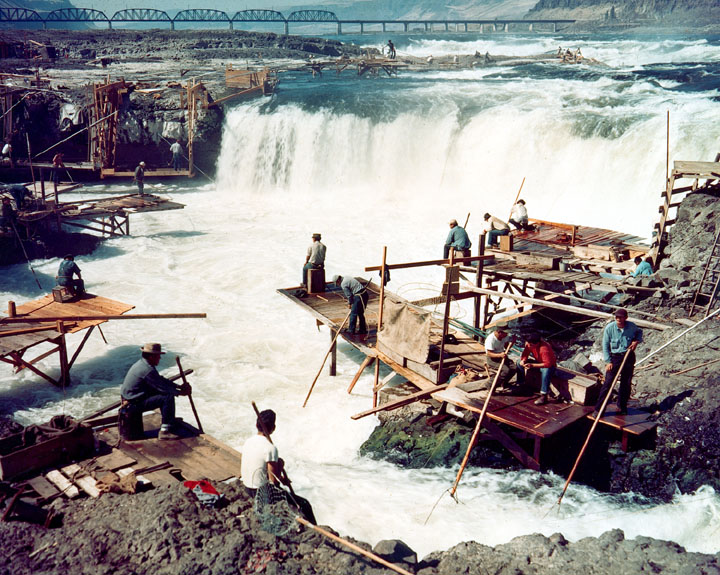
- Dipnet fishing at Celilo Falls in the 1950s

- Location within Oregon
- Location: Between Wasco County, Oregon and Klickitat County, Washington
- Coordinates: 45.64945°N 120.97792°W
- Type: Segmented steep cascade; submerged since 1957
- Watercourse: Columbia River

Celilo Falls (/səˈlaɪloʊ/; Tenino: Wyam, meaning "echo of falling water" or "sound of water upon the rocks," in several native languages) was a tribal fishing area on the Columbia River, just east of the Cascade Mountains, on what is today the border between the U.S. states of Oregon and Washington. The name refers to a series of cascades and waterfalls on the river, as well as to the native settlements and trading villages that existed there in various configurations for 15,000 years. Celilo was the oldest continuously inhabited community on the North American continent until 1957, when the falls and nearby settlements were submerged by the construction of The Dalles Dam. In 2019, there were calls by tribal leaders to restore the falls.

== Geography ==
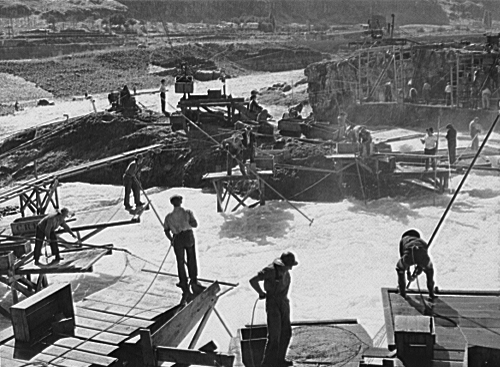
Native salmon fishermen at Celilo Falls. Russell Lee, September 1941.

=== Main waterfall ===
The main waterfall, known variously as Celilo Falls, The Chutes, Great Falls, or Columbia Falls, consisted of three sections: a cataract, called Horseshoe Falls or Tumwater Falls; a deep eddy, the Cul-de-Sac; and the main channel. These features were formed by the Columbia River's relentless push through basalt narrows on the final leg of its journey to the Pacific Ocean. Frequently more than a mile (1.6 km) in width, the river was squeezed here into a width of only 140 feet (43 m). The seasonal flow of the Columbia changed the height of the falls over the course of a year. At low water the drop was about 20 feet (6.1 m). In 1839, Modeste Demers investigated the area in some detail and described not just one fall but a great many, in different channels and with different qualities. He wrote, "The number and variety [of the channels and falls] are surprising. They are not all equally deep. The falls are from 3 to 12 and 15 feet high." During the spring freshet in June and July, the falls could be completely submerged. The falls were the sixth-largest by volume in the world and were among the largest in North America. Average annual flow was about 190,000 ft^{3}/sec (5,380 m^{3}/s), and during periods of high water or flood, as much as 1,240,000 ft^{3}/sec (35,113 m^{3}/s) passed over the falls.

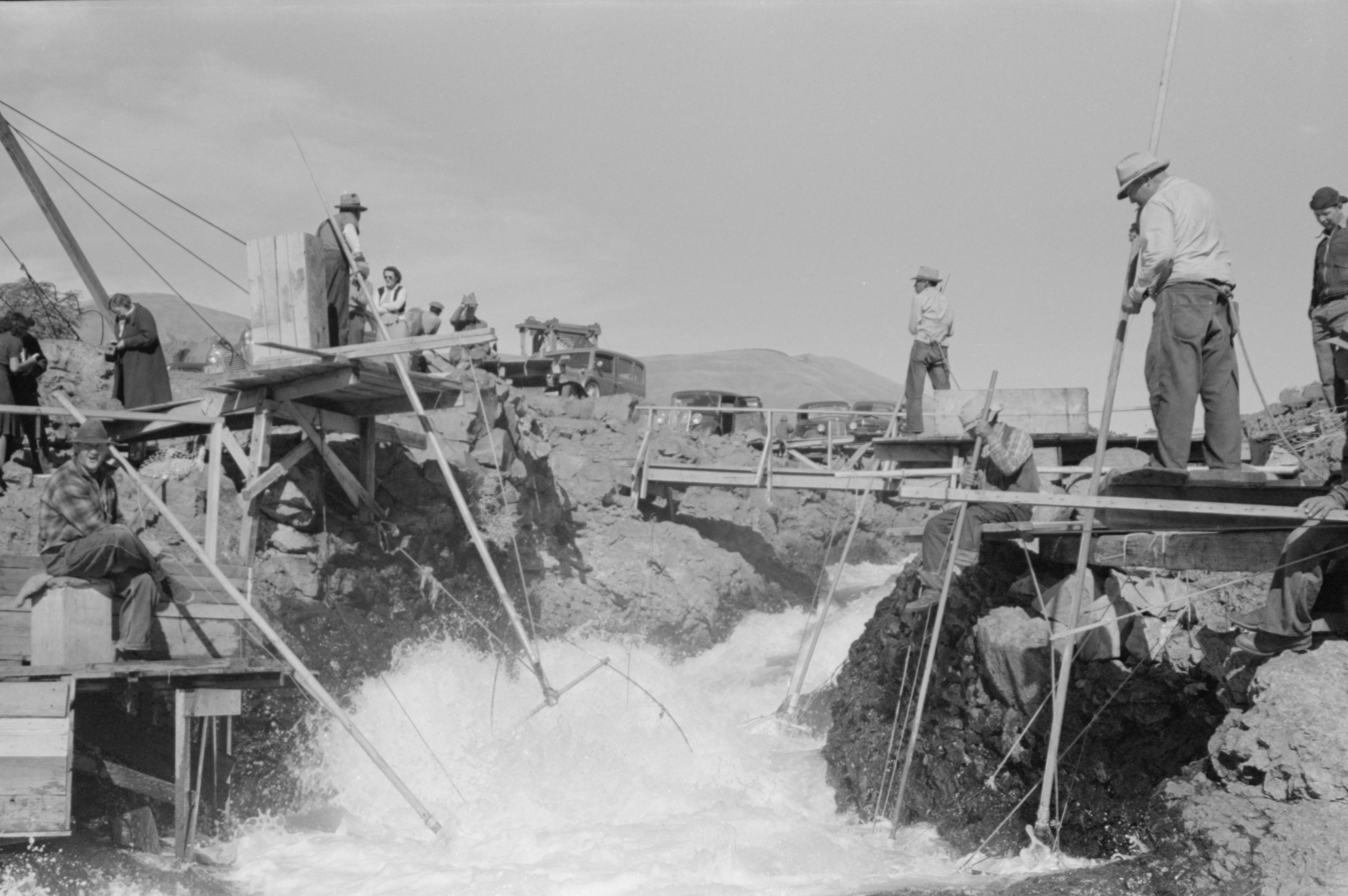
Fishing sites existed along the entire length of The Narrows. Russell Lee, September 1941.

=== The Narrows and The Dalles ===
Celilo Falls itself was the first in a series of cascades and rapids known collectively as The Narrows or The Dalles, stretching for about 12 miles (19 km) downstream. Over that length, the river dropped 82 feet (25 m) at high water and 63 feet (19 m) at low water.

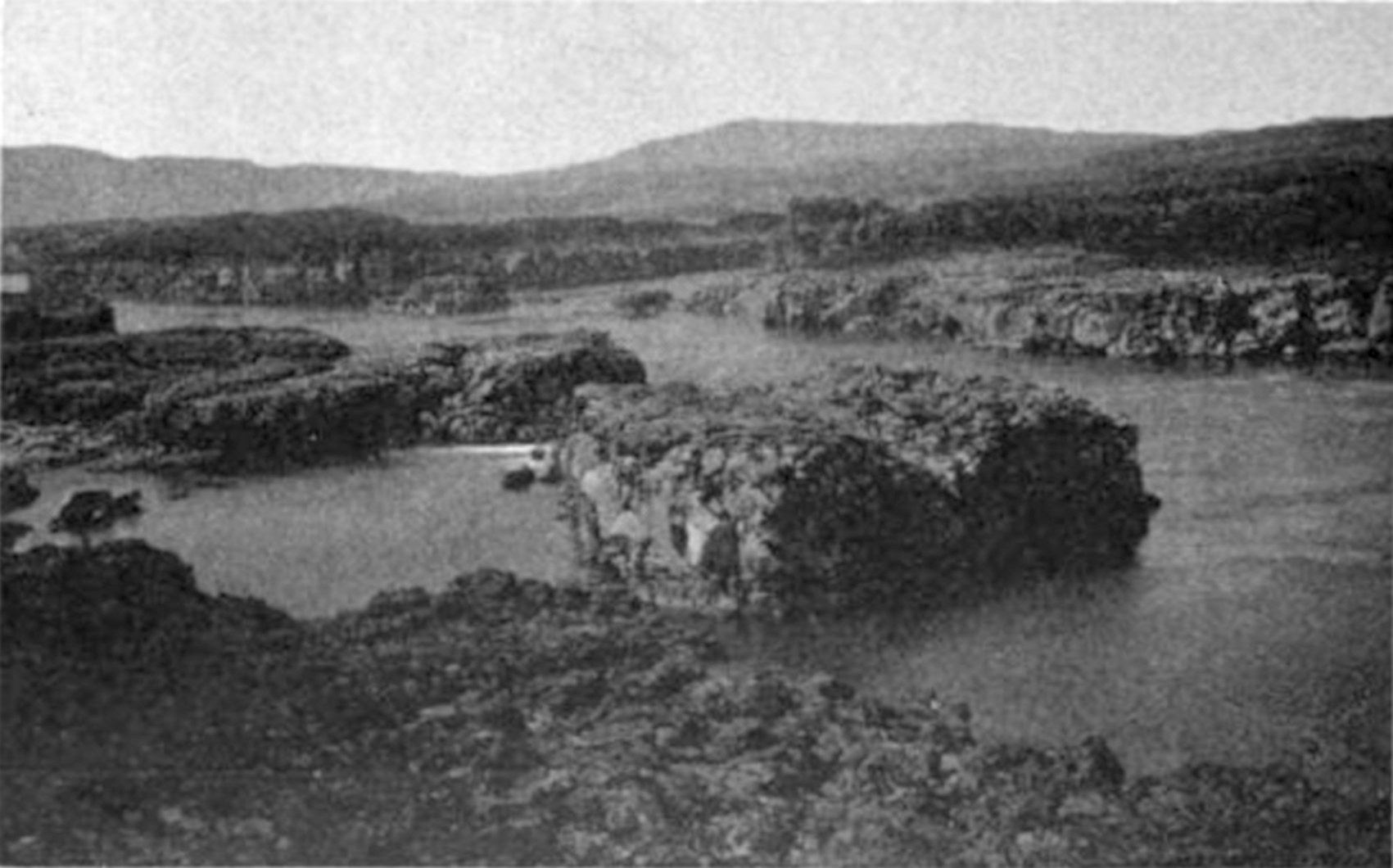
The Dalles (photo from Horner, 1919)

Three miles (4.8 km) below Celilo Falls was a stretch of rapids known variously as the Short Narrows, Ten Mile Rapids, the Little (or Upper) Dalles, or Les Petites Dalles. These rapids were about 1 mile (1.6 km) long and 250 feet (76 m) wide. Ten miles (16 km) below Celilo Falls was another stretch of rapids, this one known as the Long Narrows, Five Mile Rapids, the Big (or Lower) Dalles, Les Grandes Dalles, or Grand Dalles. This stretch of rapids was about 3 miles (4.8 km) long, and the river channel narrowed to 75 feet (23 m). Immediately downstream were the Dalles Rapids (or Wascopam to the local natives), about 1.5 miles (2.4 km) long. Here the river dropped 15 feet (4.6 m) in a tumult much commented on by early explorers.

The Long Narrows and the Dalles Rapids are sometimes grouped together under names such as Grand Dalles, Les Dalles, Big Dalles, or The Dalles. One early observer, Ross Cox, noted a three-mile "succession of boiling whirlpools." Explorer Charles Wilkes described it as "one of the most remarkable places upon the Columbia." He calculated that the river dropped about 50 feet (15 m) over 2 miles (3.2 km) here. During the spring freshet, the river rose as much as 62 feet (19 m), radically altering the nature of the rapids. Fur trader Alexander Ross wrote, "[The water] rushes with great impetuosity; the foaming surges dash through the rocks with terrific violence; no craft, either large or small, can venture there safely. During floods, this obstruction, or ledge of rocks, is covered with water, yet the passage of the narrows is not thereby improved."

== History ==
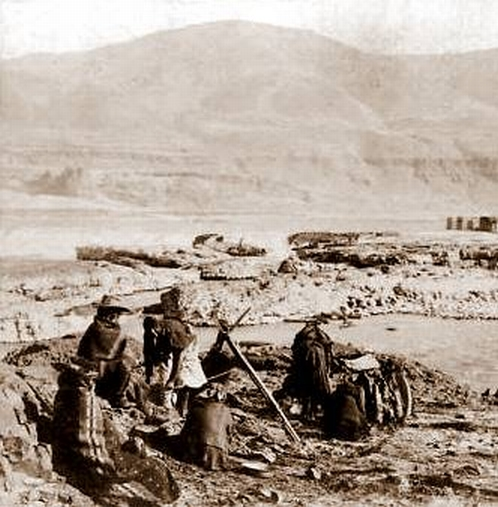
Native Americans drying salmon, circa 1900

=== Fishing and trading ===
Our waters shall be free: free to serve the uses and purposes of their creation by a Divine Providence.

— Portland investor and civic leader Joseph Nathan Teal, at the canal's opening ceremony.

Newsreel footage of native fishers at Celilo Falls in 1956, shortly before the site was submerged by The Dalles Dam

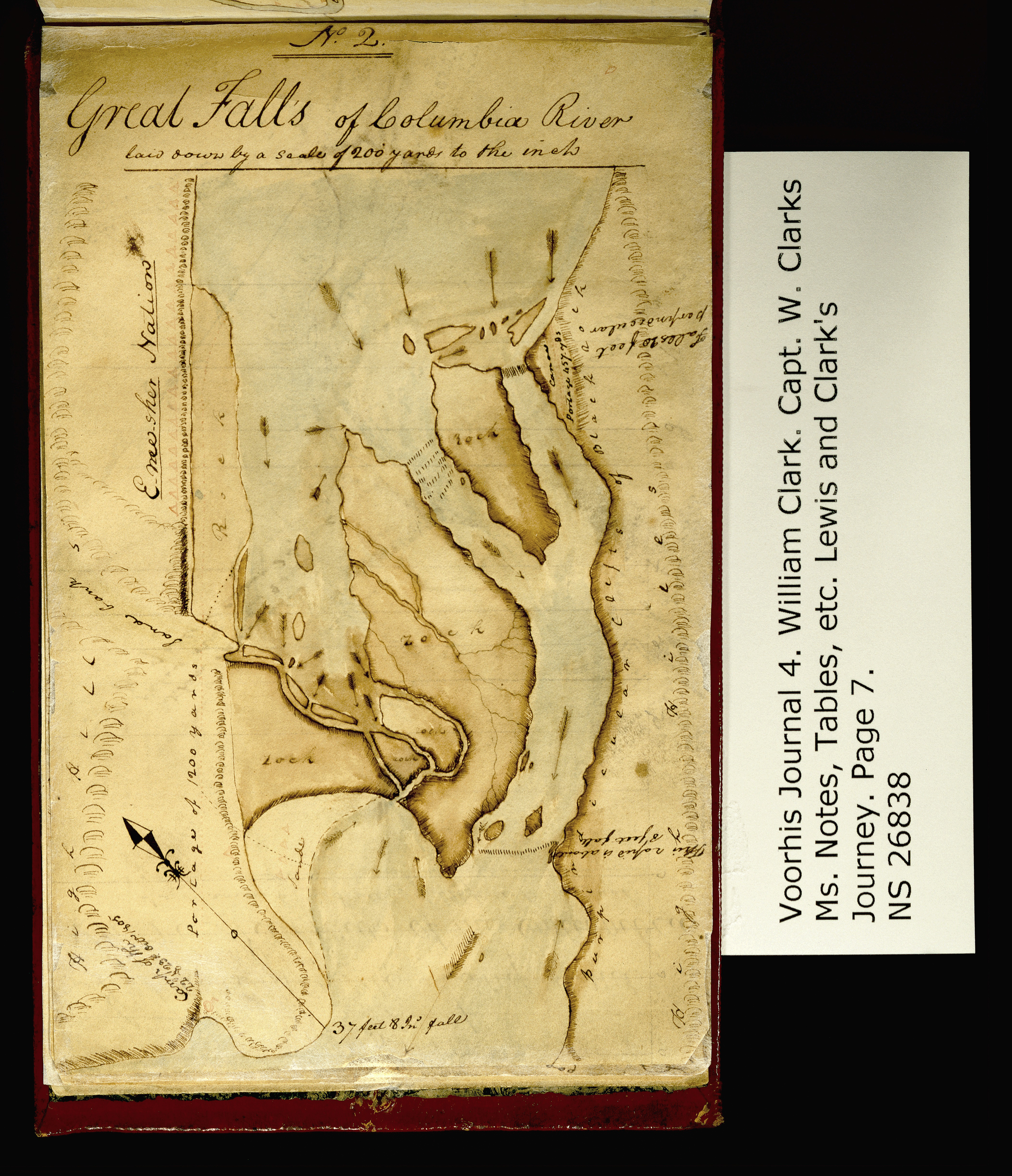
Lewis and Clark Expedition map, 1806

For 15,000 years, native peoples gathered at Wyam to fish and exchange goods. They built wooden platforms out over the water and caught salmon with dipnets and long spears on poles as the fish swam up through the rapids and jumped over the falls. Historically, an estimated fifteen to twenty million salmon passed through the falls every year, making it among the greatest fishing sites in North America.

Celilo Falls and The Dalles were strategically located at the border between Chinookan and Sahaptian speaking peoples and served as the center of an extensive trading network across the Pacific Plateau. Artifacts from the original village site at Celilo suggest that trade goods came from as far away as the Great Plains, Southwestern United States, and Alaska. There are also numerous rock art drawings at the head of the falls. This demonstrates the site to not just be important for trading purposes. It acted as a melting pot for the cultures which fished and traded there. When the Lewis and Clark Expedition passed through the area in 1805, the explorers found a "great emporium...where all the neighboring nations assemble," and a population density unlike anything they had seen on their journey. Accordingly, historians have likened the Celilo area to the "Wall Street of the West." The Wishram people lived on the north bank, while the Wasco lived on the south bank, with the most intense bargaining occurring at the Wishram village of Nix-luidix. Charles Wilkes reported finding three major native fishing sites on the lower Columbia — Celilo Falls, the Big Dalles, and Cascades Rapids, with the Big Dalles being the largest. Alexander Ross described it as the "great rendezvous" of native traders, as "the great emporium or mart of the Columbia." Pinnipeds such as sea lions and seals followed salmon up the Columbia as far as Celilo Falls. In 1841 George Simpson wrote "these animals ascend the Columbia in great numbers in quest of the salmon."

=== Navigation ===
The seasonal changes in the Columbia's flow, high in summer and low in winter, affected Celilo Falls dramatically. Lewis and Clark reached Celilo Falls in the late autumn when the water was relatively low, turning the falls into a major barrier. In contrast, when David Thompson passed Celilo Falls in July 1811, the high water obscured the falls and made his passage through the Columbia Gorge relatively easy. Modeste Demers wrote about the seasonal change in 1839: "One may be astonished to learn that these chutes, so terrible at low water, are smooth and still at very high water, which does not happen every year. Then it is that, instead of fearing them, the voyageurs hasten to approach them, to light their pipes and rest." More difficult was the Long Narrows, or Big Dalles, ten miles below Celilo Falls. This section of the river was impassable during high water. During the autumn low water they were passable but with unloaded boats only, and even then the passage was very dangerous. "They are never passed without dread," wrote François Blanchet in 1839. Narcissa Whitman asserted in 1836 that over one hundred "white lives" had been lost at the Dalles.

In the 1840s and 1850s, American pioneers began arriving in the area, traveling down the Columbia on wooden barges loaded with wagons. Many lost their lives in the violent currents near Celilo. In the 1870s, the Army Corps of Engineers embarked on a plan to improve navigation on the river. In 1915, they completed the 14-mile (23 km) Celilo Canal, a portage allowing steamboats to circumvent the turbulent falls. Though the canal's opening was greeted with great enthusiasm and anticipation, the canal was scarcely used and was completely idle by 1919.

== Flooding by the dam ==
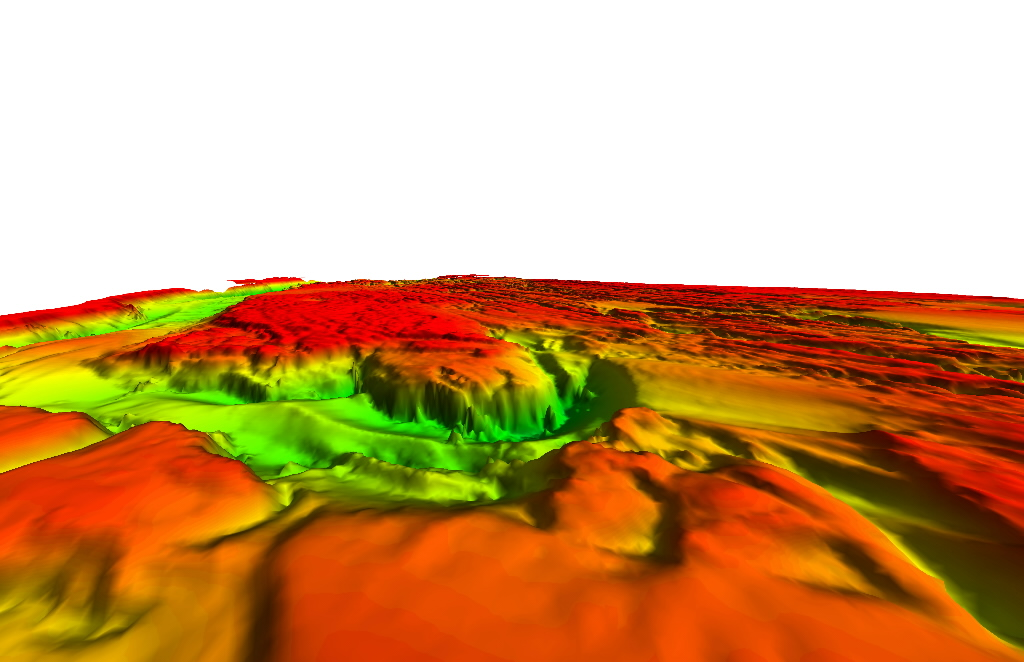
2008 sonar survey showing Celilo Falls remains intact.

As more settlers arrived in the Pacific Northwest in the 1930s and 1940s, civic leaders advocated a system of hydroelectric dams on the Columbia River. They argued that the dams would improve navigation for barge traffic from interior regions to the ocean; provide a reliable source of irrigation for agricultural production; provide electricity for the World War II defense industry; and alleviate the flooding of downriver cities, as occurred in the 1948 destruction of Vanport, Oregon.

Aluminum production, shipbuilding, and nuclear production at the Hanford site contributed to a rapid increase in regional demand for electricity. By 1943, fully 96 percent of Columbia River electricity was being used for war manufacturing. The volume of water at Celilo Falls made The Dalles an attractive site for a new dam in the eyes of the Corps of Engineers.

Throughout this period, native people continued to fish at Celilo, under the provisions of the 1855 Treaties signed with the Yakama Nation, the Confederated Tribes of Warm Springs, and the Walla Walla, Umatilla, and Cayuse, which guaranteed the tribes' ancient "right of taking fish at all usual and accustomed stations." In 1947, the federal government convened Congressional hearings and concluded that the proposed dam at The Dalles would not violate tribal fishing rights under the treaties. Subsequently, the government reached a monetary settlement with the affected tribes, paying $26.8 million for the loss of Celilo and other fishing sites on the Columbia.

The Army Corps of Engineers commenced work on The Dalles Dam in 1952 and completed it five years later. On March 10, 1957, hundreds of observers looked on as a rising Lake Celilo rapidly silenced the falls, submerged fishing platforms, and consumed the village of Celilo, ending an age-old existence for those who lived there. A small Native American community exists today at nearby Celilo Village, on a bluff overlooking the former location of the falls.

In 2008 the Army Corps of Engineers completed a survey of the Celilo Falls site using sonar technology, in response to the 50th anniversary of the flooding of the falls. The survey revealed that the falls remain intact below the artificial lake, and that "rocky outcrops, carved basins and channels that match aerial photographs from the 1940s."

== Legacy ==
Celilo Falls retains great cultural significance for native peoples. Ted Strong of the Intertribal Fish Commission told one historian, "If you are an Indian person and you think, you can still see all the characteristics of that waterfall. If you listen, you can still hear its roar. If you inhale, the fragrances of mist and fish and water come back again." In 2007, three thousand people gathered at Celilo Village to commemorate the 50-year anniversary of the inundation of the falls.

In Ken Kesey's novel One Flew Over the Cuckoo's Nest, the narrator, Chief Bromden, grows up in a native village near the waterfall. In one section, he encounters the government agents sent to appraise the land and negotiate with Bromden's father, the chief of the village at the time.

Artist and architect Maya Lin is working on interpretive artwork at Celilo for the Confluence Project, scheduled for completion in 2019.

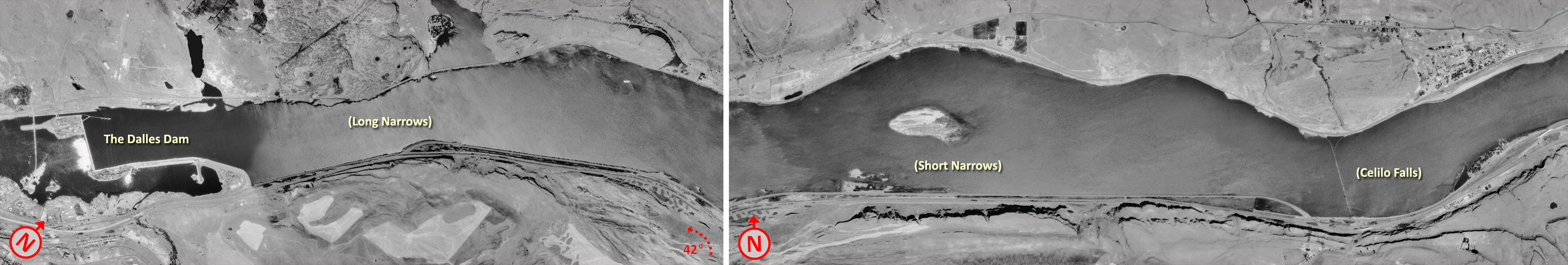
Aerial view of Lake Celilo on the Columbia River, after construction of The Dalles Dam. The former location of Celilo Falls, the Short Narrows, and the Long Narrows are noted in parentheses. (The river bends to the southwest downstream of Browns Island; the left panel is rotated so that the image fits horizontally.)

== Restoration calls ==
Yakama and Lummi nation leaders called for a restoration of the falls in 2019, who noted that Indigenous peoples never agreed to the submergence of the falls. They cited that the river's temperature has become hotter with the reservoir each year and that there has been a large decline in salmon populations. They also noted that the dam has destroyed fishing sites that were guaranteed to the tribes in treaties 150 years ago. In response, Northwest RiverPartners issued a statement that the dam remains important for hydropower electricity generation for ports and businesses in the area.

== See also ==
- List of waterfalls
- List of waterfalls by flow rate
- List of rapids of the Columbia River
