= Atfalati =

Tribe of Native Americans of the Tualatin Valley, Oregon

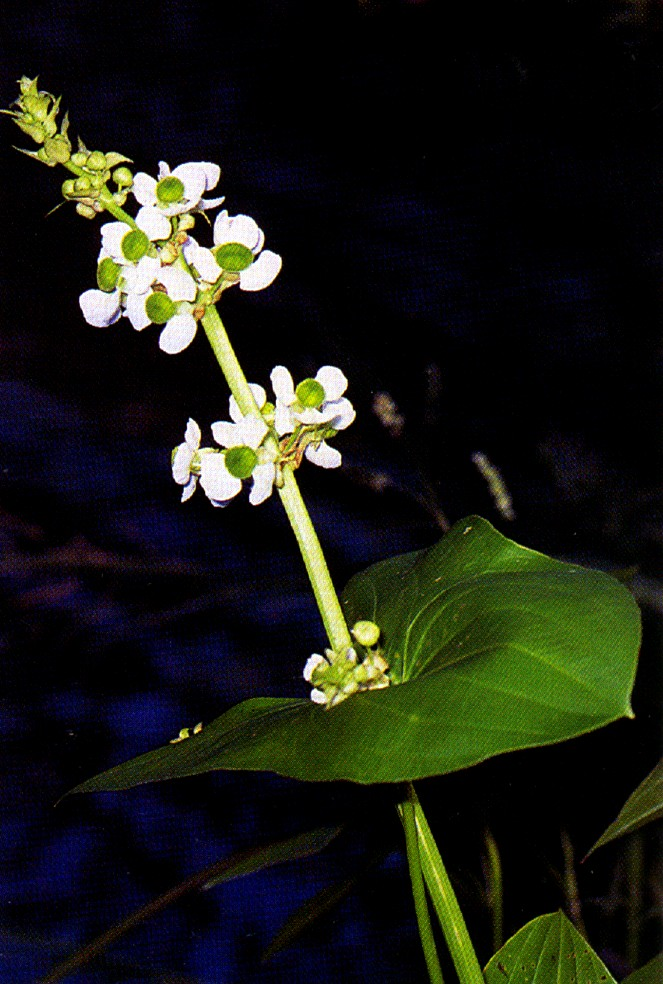
Wapato plant

The Atfalati [aˈtɸalati], also known as the Tualatin or Wapato Lake Indians are a tribe of the Kalapuya Native Americans who originally inhabited and continue to steward some 24 villages on the Tualatin Plains in the northwest part of the U.S. state of Oregon; the Atfalati also live in the hills around Forest Grove, along Wapato Lake and the north fork of the Yamhill River, and into areas of Southern Portland.

The Atfalati speak the Tualatin-Yamhill (Northern Kalapuya) language, which is one of the three Kalapuyan languages.

== History and culture ==
Atfalati people ranged around the valley, engaged in a hunter-gatherer lifestyle. Primary food stuffs included deer, camas root, fish, berries, elk, and various nuts. To encourage the growth of the camas plant and maintain habitat beneficial to deer and elk, the group burned the valley floor to discourage the growth of forests, a common practice among the Kalapuya.

Before Euro-American contact, the Atfalati were known for wearing adornment such a red feathers on the head. Both men and women had pierced earlobes and noses, hanging long beads and bright dentalia from them. Compared to the peoples to the south, the Atfalati practiced a more severe form of infant head flattening, and compared to the peoples to the east of the Cascade Mountains raised fewer horses. The Atfalati kept slaves, who could sometimes purchase their freedom with horses. The Atfalati lived in rectangular multi-family houses.

Euro-Americans began arriving in the Atfalati's homeland in the early 19th century, and settlers in the 1840s. As with the other Kalapuyan peoples, the arrival of Euro-Americans led to dramatic social disruptions. By the 1830s the Atfalati had already begun to adopt Euro-American clothing styles. In the 1830s, diseases had decimated Native populations in the Pacific Northwest, including the Atfalati. The tribe had already experienced population decreased from smallpox epidemics in 1782 and 1783. These upheavals diminished the Atfalati's ability to challenge white encroachment. It is estimated that the band was reduced to a population of around 600 in 1842, and had shrunk to only 60 in 1848.

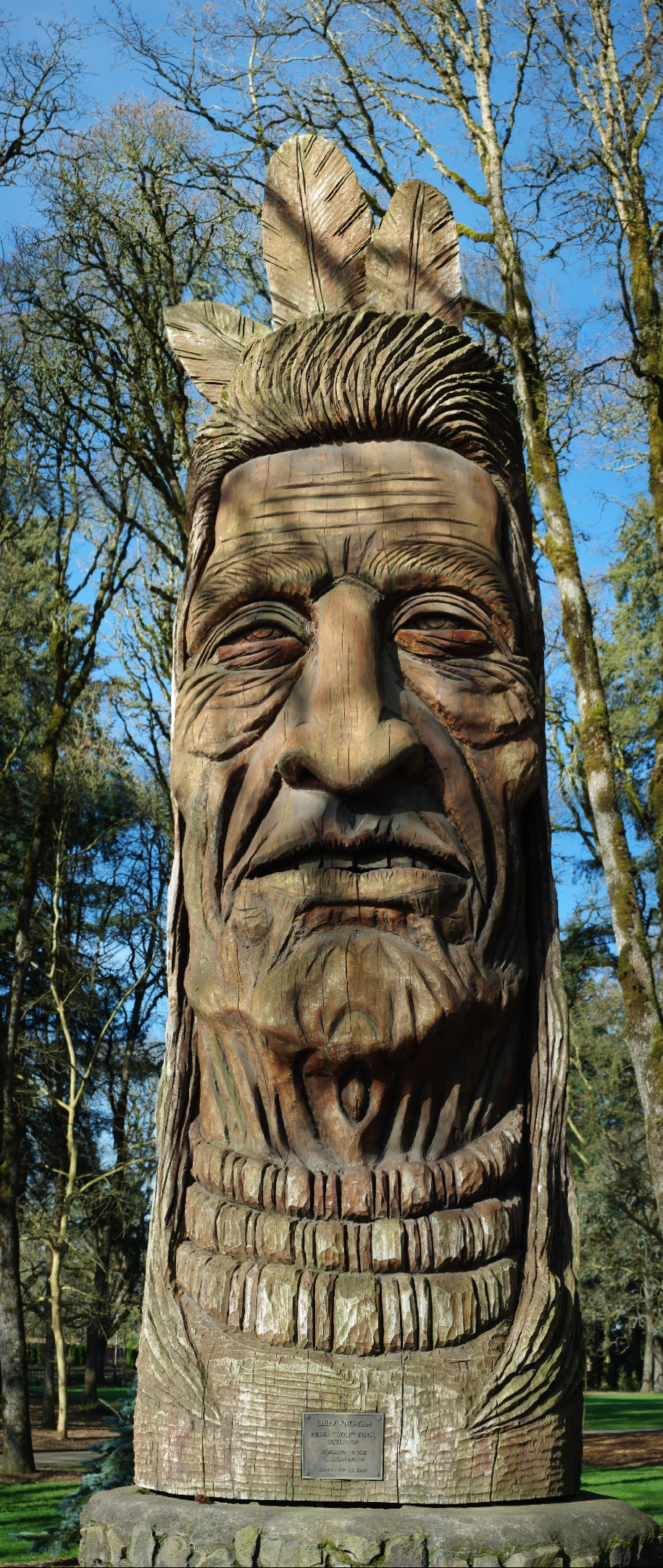
Chief Kno-Tah

By the 1850s, white settlers were rapidly populating the Willamette Valley, and the United States government (represented by Anson Dart, superintendent for Indian affairs in the Oregon Territory) negotiated treaties in 1851 with the Kalapuyans, including the Atfalati. Under the terms of a treaty of April 19, 1851, the Atfalatis ceded their lands in return for a small reservation at Wapato Lake as well as "money, clothing, blankets, tools, a few rifles, and a horse for each of their headmen--Kiacut, La Medicine, and Knolah." At the time of the treaty, there were 65 Atfalatis. The treaty resulted in the loss of much of the Atfalati's lands, but was preferable to removal east of the Cascade Mountains, which the government initially had demanded. This treaty, however, was never ratified.

Under continuing pressure, the government and Kalapuya renegotiated a treaty with Joel Palmer, Dart's successor. This treaty, the Treaty with the Kalapuya, etc. (also known as the Willamette Valley Treaty or Dayton Treaty) was signed January 4, 1855, and ratified by Congress, on March 3, 1855 (10 Stat. 1143). Under the terms of the treaty, the indigenous peoples of the Willamette Valley agreed to remove to a reservation to be designated by the federal government. The government later designated the Grand Ronde reservation in the western part of the Willamette Valley at the foothills of the Oregon Coast Range as the permanent reservation for a variety of tribes.

Following this, the Atfalati tribe declined; the 1870 census showed 60 members living at the Grand Ronde reservation and the 1910 Census showed only 44; a 1914 Smithsonian Institution publication listed a single survivor living on the Yakima Reservation in Washington. The degree to which the Atfalati assimilated with whites over time is not known.

== See also ==
- Chief Kno-Tah, a wooden statue in honor of an Atfalati—Tualatin chief
- Ki-a-Kuts Falls
- Mohawk people, another band of the Kalapuya
- Neerchokikoo
