= Yoncalla language =

Extinct Native American language formerly spoken in Oregon

Yoncalla
- Southern Kalapuya
- Native to: United States
- Region: Northwest Oregon
- Ethnicity: Yoncalla Kalapuya
- Extinct: 1930s
- Language family: Kalapuyan: Yoncalla

Language codes
- ISO 639-3: sxk
- Glottolog: yonc1234

Yoncalla (also Southern Kalapuya or Yonkalla) is an extinct Kalapuyan language once spoken in southwest Oregon in the United States. In the 19th century it was spoken by the Yoncalla band of the Kalapuya people in the Umpqua River valley. It is closely related to Central Kalapuya and Northern Kalapuya, spoken in the Willamette Valley to the north.

The last known user of the language was Laura Blackery Albertson, who attested to being a partial speaker in 1937.
