= Kalapuya =

Native American tribe

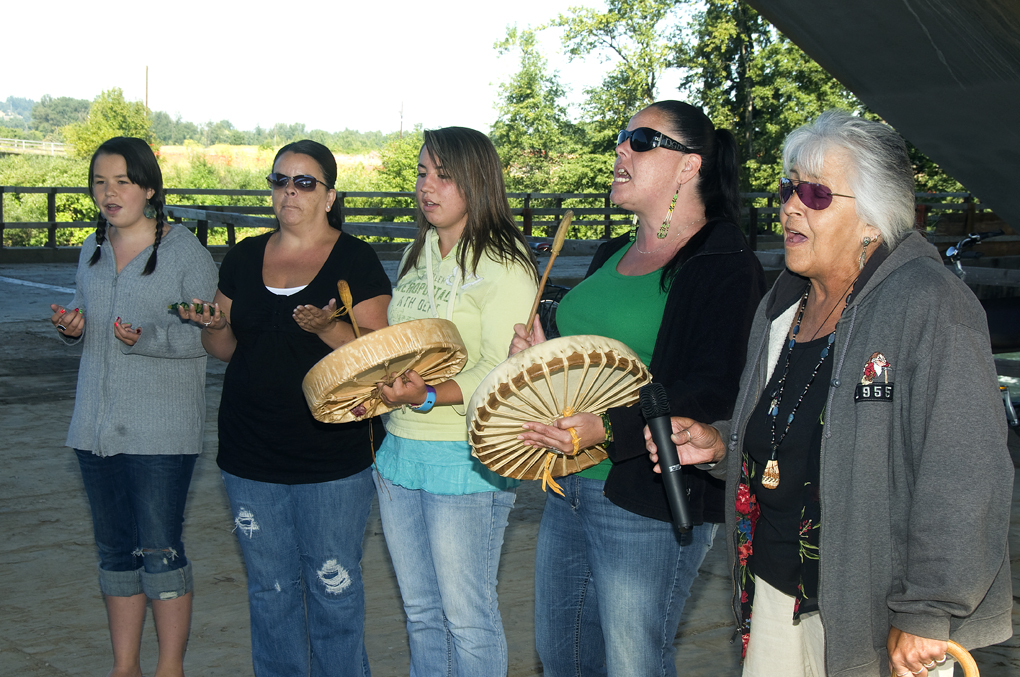
- Esther Stutzman, a Kalapuya elder, leads her daughters, along with two members of the next generation, in a Kalapuya welcome song, 2009.

Total population
- estimated 4,000

Regions with significant populations
- United States United States (Oregon)

Languages
- English, formerly Kalapuya

The Kalapuya or Kʼalapʰuya are a Native American people, which had eight independent groups speaking three mutually intelligible dialects. The Kalapuya tribes' traditional homelands were the Willamette Valley of present-day western Oregon in the United States, an area bounded by the Cascade Range to the east, the Oregon Coast Range at the west, the Columbia River at the north, to the Calapooya Mountains of the Umpqua River at the south.

Today, most Kalapuya people are enrolled in the federally recognized Confederated Tribes of the Grand Ronde Community of Oregon; in addition, some are members of the Confederated Tribes of the Siletz. In both cases descendants have often intermarried with people of other tribes in the confederated tribes, and are counted in overall tribal numbers, rather than separately. Most of the Kalapuya descendants live at the Grand Ronde reservation, located in Yamhill and Polk counties.

== Name ==
The tribal name has been rendered into English under various spellings as "Calapooia," "Calapuya," "Calapooya," "Kalapooia," and "Kalapooya."

In the Chinuk Wawa language program at Grand Ronde, operated by the CTGR Education Department, the people's name is spelt Kʼalapʰuya; this is to reflect that, in the Kalapuyan languages, the endonym is pronounced such that the K is ejective (with a significant amount of extra sound energy built-up at the glottis) and the P is aspirated (with a small amount of extra sound energy pushed from the lungs, as compared to plain P).

The three Kalapuyan languages, in their many dialects, have contributed many words to the Chinuk Wawa language. Kalapuyan words, such as their endonym, retain their historic Kalapuyan pronunciation in the Chinuk Wawa language. The Kalapuyan languages themselves are not currently under revitalization, though this is a future goal, in addition to the nation's Chinuk Wawa Revitalization Program, of many Grand Ronde citizens, along with other Kalapuyan descendants, such as those with Siltez citizenship, among others.

== Language ==
The Kalapuyan people spoke dialects of the Kalapuyan language. It was categorized by John Wesley Powell as part of the Takelman language group. In the early 21st century, these are known as the Oregon Penutian languages.

The Kalapuyan people were not a single homogeneous tribal entity but rather were made up of eight autonomous subdivisions, loosely related to one another by three language dialects, which were mutually intelligible. The eight related groups comprising the Kalapuya people spoke three distinct dialects of the Oregon Penutian language family: Northern Kalapuyan, Central Kalapuyan, and Yoncalla (also called Southern Kalapuya).

Catholic missionary François Blanchet said that "fourteen or fifteen different dialects were spoken by these tribes; they are not so essentially different but that they can understand each other. Moreover, the Chinook Jargon is spoken among the Kalapooias [sic]." Chinook Jargon was a trade language that developed among the Native Americans for their own use and for trading with Europeans. It became popular on the Grand Ronde Reservation. The Confederated Tribes of the Grand Ronde Community have renamed it as Chinuk Wawa, and developed a language immersion program for children to create new generations of native speakers.

== Social structure ==
Kalapuya bands typically consisted of extended families of related men, their wives, and children. They had a patrilineal kinship system. These bands would occupy a year-round village: during the winter they lived there full-time. During the spring and summer, some members split off into smaller groups and traveled to other areas to gather seasonal food and raw materials for basketry. Bands frequently had a single leader or chief— generally the wealthiest man — who would resolve arguments, settle collective debts of the community such as those incurred through gambling, and would provide food for feasts.

As was the case for many tribes of the Pacific Northwest, the Kalapuya practiced slavery. They generally obtained Indian slaves through trade or as gifts. The slaves were usually captured by enemy peoples during raids. Northern Kalapuya groups, such as the Tualatin and Yamhill, obtained slaves through conquest, raiding bands located on the coast or further south in the Willamette Valley. Slaves were considered a form of wealth; they were traded to obtain desired commodities, including beads, blankets, and canoes. Women and children were preferred as slaves, owing to their comparative ease of control.

Slaves lived with the families who owned them, working side-by-side in gender-specific daily tasks and performing chores such as the collection of firewood and water. Slaves were often free to marry. They could purchase freedom through their own accumulation of property or through sufficient payment to the owner by a prospective spouse.

The patriarchal Kalapuyan society had divisions by wealth and personal property. Special religious leaders were also recognized as a distinct class. These people were believed to possess supernatural predictive or healing powers and could have their origin in any group; they might be male or female, free individual or slave.

Kalapuyan society had gender-differentiated labor, as did many Native American tribes. Men engaged in fishing, hunting, and warfare. They also made tools and constructed canoes. Women worked to gather and prepare the staple plant foods that were the basis of the Kalapuyan diet, set up temporary camps, and constructed baskets and other craft products. During the summer months the women of the band would process and prepare food products for winter storage, generally staying in the main village to complete the task, while others gathered the foods from afar.

=== Gender roles ===
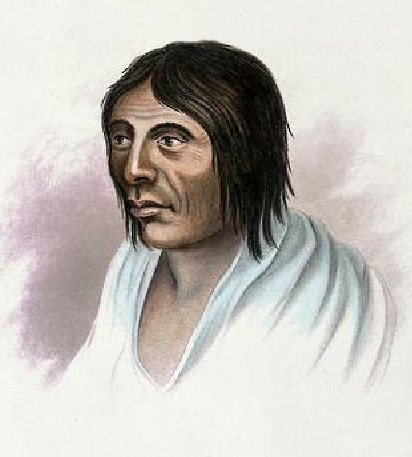
Kalapuya man of today's Willamette Valley, Oregon, USA; circa 1840, by Alfred Thomas Agate

The Kalapuya had a patriarchal society consisting of bands or villages, usually led in social and political life by a male leader or group of leaders. The primary leader was generally the man with the greatest wealth. While female leaders did exist, it was more common for a woman to gain status in spiritual leadership. Kalapuya bands typically consisted of extended families of related men, their wives, and children. Ceremonial leaders could be male or female, and spiritual power was regarded as more valuable than material wealth. As such, the spiritual leaders were often more influential than the political leaders.

Kalapuya males usually hunted while the women and young children gathered food and set up camps. As the vast majority of the Kalapuya diet consisted largely of gathered food, the women supplied most of the sustenance. Women were also in charge of food preparation, preservation, and storage. The food hunted by men usually consisted of deer, elk, and fish from the rivers of the Willamette Valley, including salmon and eel. Plants gathered included wapato, tarweed seeds, hazelnuts, and especially camas. The camas bulbs were cooked by women into a cake-like bread which was considered valuable.

Women were involved in the community life and expressed their individual opinions. When a man wanted to marry a woman, he had to pay a bride price to her father. If a man slept with or raped another man's wife, he was required to pay the bride price to the husband. If he did not, he would be cut on the arm or face. If the man could pay the price, he could take the woman to be his wife.

There is a reference to gender variant people being accepted in Kalapuya culture. A Kalapuya spiritual person named Ci'mxin is recalled by John B. Hudson in his interviews from the Kalapuya Texts:

They would say "He is a man (in body), he has changed to a woman (in dress and manner of life). But he is not a woman (in body). It is his spirit-power it is said that has told him, You become woman. You are always to wear your (woman's) dress just like women. That is the way you must always do."

After the arrival of Europeans to the Willamette Valley and the creation of the Grand Ronde Reservation and boarding schools such as Chemawa Indian School, children of the Kalapuya people were taught the typical gender roles of Europeans.

=== Historic Kalapuyan groups ===
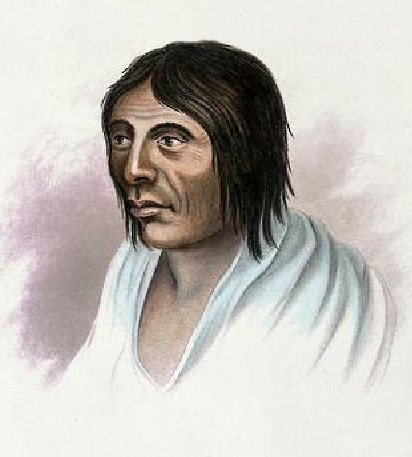
An engraving of a Kalapuya man, from an illustration by Alfred T. Agate, 1840s

The Kalapuyan groups (identified by language) were:

Northern Kalapuya:

- Tualatin, also known as the Atfalati, along the Tualatin River
- Yamhill, along the Yamhill River

Central Kalapuya:

- Ahantchuyuk, along the Pudding River
- Luckiamute, along the Luckiamute River
- Santiam, along the lower Santiam River near present-day Lebanon
- Chepenefa, along the Marys River near present-day Corvallis
- Chemapho, along Muddy Creek (Central Kalapuya)
- Tsankupi, along the Calapooia River
- Mohawk, along the Mohawk River (Note: These have no relation to the Iroquoian-speaking Mohawk people of New York and Canada)
- Chafan
- Chelamela, along the Long Tom River
- Winefelly, along the Mohawk, McKenzie, and Coast Fork Willamette rivers.

Yoncalla:

- Yoncalla, along the Umpqua River.

In his description of the Indians of the Willamette Valley in 1849, Governor Joseph Lane gave the following estimates for the tribes' populations: "Calipoa": 60; "Tualatine": 60; "Yam Hill": 90; "Lucka-mues": 15.

== History ==
The Kalapuya people are believed to have entered their historical homeland in the Willamette Valley by migrating from the south of the valley northwards and forcing out earlier inhabitants.

Each of these bands occupied specific areas along the Willamette, Umpqua, and McKenzie rivers. The various Kalapuyan bands were hunter-gatherers, gaining food by fishing and hunting by the men, and gathering of nuts, berries and other fruits and roots by the women. The tribe made use of obsidian obtained from the volcanic ranges to the east to fashion sharp and effective projectile points, including arrowheads and spear tips.

Prior to contact with white explorers, traders, and missionaries, the Kalapuya population is believed to have numbered around 15,000 people with some experts estimating 25,000. Robert Boyd estimates the total Kalapuyan population between 8,780 and 9,200 for the period between 1805 and the end of the decade of the 1820s.

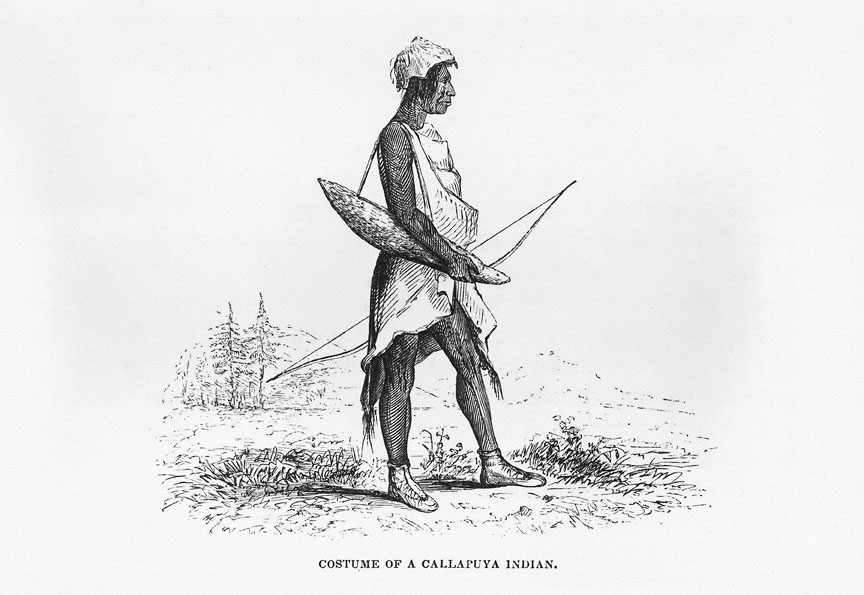
Woodcut of a native Kalapuya man by an early explorer.

Catastrophic epidemics of infectious diseases such as malaria, smallpox, and other endemic diseases occurred after Natives contracted diseases from the white colonizers, traders, and missionaries who entered the region. Also, many of them were slaughtered by the colonizers for their lands and food. These diseases were endemic among the Europeans and Americans, but the Native Americans didn't have immunity to them and died at a high rate as a result. Some accounts tell of villages devoid of inhabitants, standing in grim testament to the high mortality of these epidemics. Blanchet reported in 1839 that diseases "reduced [them] to a very small population threatening to decline more and more."

By 1849 Oregon territorial governor Joseph Lane reckoned the remaining Kalapuyan population at just 60 souls — with those survivors living in the most dire of conditions. Contemporary scholarship estimates the total of the various Kalapuya peoples in this interval at closer to 600.

=== Treaties with the United States ===
The United States conducted two major cycles of treatymaking in Oregon that affected the Kalapuya: in 1851 and in 1854 to 1855. The 1851 treaties were negotiated by Oregon's Superintendent of Indian Affairs Anson Dart, and those in 1855 by Dart's successor Joel Palmer. While the 1851 treaties were never ratified by the Senate and thus were not implemented, the 1854–1855 ones were.

On April 12, 1851, at the Santiam Treaty Council in Champoeg, Oregon Territory, Santiam Kalapuya tribal leaders voiced strong opinions over where they would live. The Santiam leaders Alquema and Tiacan wanted to maintain their traditional territory between the forks of the Santiam River.

In the 1854 Treaty of Calapooia Creek, Oregon, Umpqua and Kalapuyan tribes of Umpqua Valley ceded their lands to the United States.

In the Treaty with the Kalapuya, etc., at Dayton, Oregon (January 22, 1855), the Kalapuya and other tribes of the Willamette valley ceded the entire drainage area of the Willamette River to the United States.

=== Reservation era ===
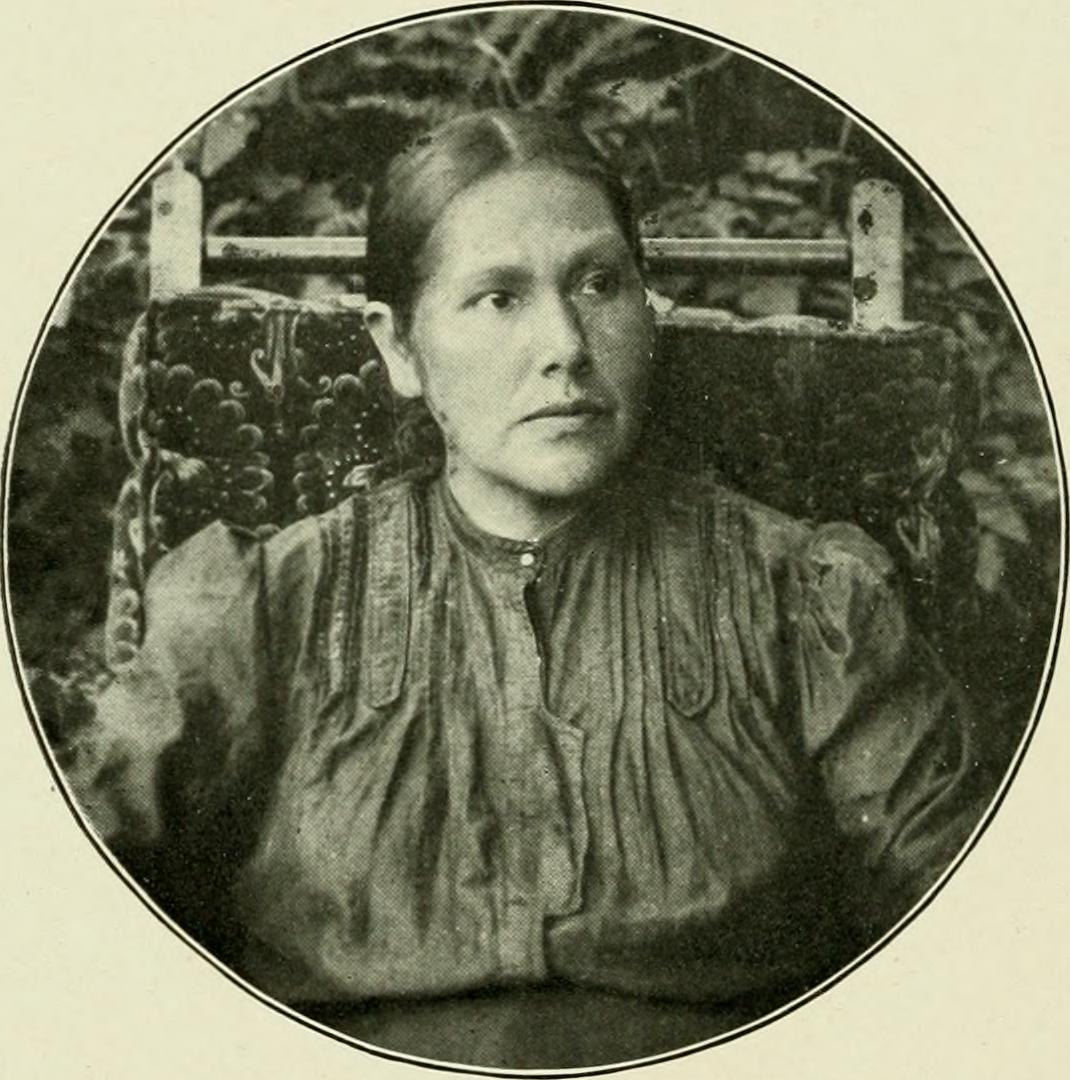
Lucindra Jackson, Yonkalla tribe, Kalapuya, ca. 1912

Most Kalapuya Indians were removed to the Grand Ronde Agency and reservation. Some were assigned to the Siletz Reservation (known then as the Coast Indian Reservation) on the central Pacific Coast of Oregon, Warm Springs Reservation east of the Cascade Mountains in what are now Wasco and Jefferson Counties, or Yakama Reservation in Southern Washington State. Settled in 1855 as a temporary reserve, the Grand Ronde Reservation was first called the Yamhill River Reserve or Yamhill Valley reserve. It was officially renamed and established as the Grand Ronde Reservation by Executive Order in 1857.

With members of at least 27 tribes removed to Grand Ronde, life at the reservation was difficult. Some of these tribes had historically been enemies. In the early years, the reservation was managed by the US Department of War. As it had earlier waged war against the tribes, it supervised Indian affairs across the country. Fort Yamhill was established to oversee the Indians. Later Indian management was taken over by the Commissioner of Indian Affairs and finally the Bureau of Indian Affairs, placed within the Department of Interior.

Rev. Adrien Croquet (Crocket) of Belgium was the Roman Catholic missionary at Grand Ronde and established St. Michael's church. The Roman Catholic Church also established a school there in the late 19th century with approval by the United States. The school was an on-reservation boarding school to which children from other sites were at times forcibly removed and made to stay at school throughout the school year. Many children were later sent to off-reservation Indian boarding schools, such as Chemawa Indian School in Salem. Most children were taught rural skills such as blacksmithing, farming, sewing, etc. believed to be important to their future lives on the reservation.

Sanitation and health care at the reservation was poor, and mortality was high. In the 1850s a total of 1,000 people had been moved there. By 1900, only about 300 people survived.

=== Termination and restoration ===
In the mid-20th century, Federal policy continued to be directed at assimilation of Native Americans. Congress believed that some tribes were ready to enter the mainstream society and end their special relationship with the government. All of the bands and tribes of the Kalapuya descendants were terminated in 1954, along with all other western Oregon tribes, in the Western Oregon Indian Termination Act of 1954. This ended their special relationship with the federal government. Under final termination actions, the government sold most of the reservation lands, removed its services, and published final rolls of the tribe in the Congressional Record in 1956.

In the late 20th century, the Kalapuya and other peoples in the confederated tribes reorganized to assert their Native American culture. The United States restored federal recognition in 1977 to the Confederated Tribes of the Siletz and in 1983 to those who were part of the Confederated Tribes of the Grand Ronde Community of Oregon.

The Kalapuya have intermarried extensively with descendants of their neighboring tribes. Most of the estimated 4,000 Kalapuya descendants today are enrolled in Confederated Tribes of the Grand Ronde Community of Oregon. This community is working to revive a common creole Native American language, long used for trade among various tribes and now known as Chinuk Wawa, by developing an immersion program for their children. They have had success in producing native speakers and are expanding the program through the eighth grade.

== Kalapuya Traditional Ecological Knowledge ==
The Kalapuya harvested and gathered different food and other resources in certain areas at certain seasons of the year.

Seasonal Rounds Of the Atfalati-Kalapuya:

In summer(May–August) the Atfalati-Kalapuya obtained Honey, Wild onions, insects such as grasshoppers and crickets. Berries such as Blackberries, Salmonberries, Huckleberries of the evergreen variety and red variety, Oregon Grape, Salal Berries, Thimbleberry, and Black Raspberries. Tarweed, Yampah, Killdeer, Bitterroot, Eels, Wild carrot, Cow Parsnip, Lomantium, Skunk Cabbage, Balasamroot, Yerba Buena, Wild Mint, fish and other fresh water animals such as Sturgeon, Eulachon, Salmon, Crawfish, and Freshwater Mussels. In Fall (September and October) Plants such as Wapato, Bear Berries, Tobacco, Myrtlewood Nuts, Hazelnuts, and Acorns, Animals such as Raccoon, Timber Wolf, Bobcat, Cougar, Chipmonk, Grouse, and Quail. In Winter (November- February) Animals such as Bear, Beaver, Geese, Roosevelt Elk, Black Tailed Deer, and WhiteTailed Deer. In Spring (March and April) plants such as Cats Ear, Bracken Fern, Cattails, and Camas.

How these Resources were obtained:

Fishing was done with a specific basket, a variety of Dipnets, mesh net Traps, and a variety of Fishing spears. Hunting was done by the men of the tribe who used different kinds of snares, a multitude of spears, and bows and arrows to catch their game. Wapato is a starchy tuber that was collected by women using their feet to free the starchy bulb from its pond floor habitat. The bulb is lighter than water and thus would float on water where it could be easily transferred by hand into a nearby canoe. Camas is another starchy tuber that women of the tribe harvested, they would free the starchy bulb from the soil with a stick fit with a handle and curved on the digging end, after which could be easily gathered into carrying baskets.

=== Baskets, clothing, tools, mats, plank houses, canoes and rope ===
Rope was made from dogbane, Canoes and planks for plank houses from Cedar tree wood, a multitude of waterproof clothing and hats from Cedar bark, a variety of mats from Tule and Cattail, and varieties of household tools, clothing and baskets from rushes.

Trading goods procured through Traditional Ecological Knowledge:

Through the Columbia Trade Network Kalapuyans mostly traded their dried Wapato and Camas flour cakes, for goods from other regions such as buffalo hides, shells, whale products, and dried salmon, some of which would be traded with other tribes for their unique goods.

Beneficial overland burning:

Traditional fire setting was part of a restorative process of well thought out long term land management. These well planned, and well managed burns fueled long term prosperity by enriching the soil, encouraging and resulting in greater biodiversity, clearing brush, disease and pests, and preventing unwanted large scale fires. In Oregon it was a yearly late Autumn event to burn Wild Wheat grass prairies, resulting in the ripe wheat berries being well dried in the fire and left atop the ashes.

Teaching Traditional Ecological Knowledge in modern settings and spreading awareness:

Groups such as the Komemma Cultural Protection Association, a top rated charity by Charitynavigator.org are doing work to restore the Cultural and Traditional Ecological knowledges of the Kalapuyans.

== See also ==
- Kalapuyan languages
- Neerchokikoo
