= Mohawk people (Oregon) =

Trine of Kalapuya

The Mohawk or Mohawk River people were a tribe or band of the Kalapuya, who originally lived in the Mohawk River area of present-day Oregon in the United States. They spoke a dialect of the Central Kalapuya language.

Like the other bands of the Kalapuya, the Mohawk signed the Treaty with the Kalapuya, etc. in 1855 with the United States, also known as the Dayton Treaty, which was negotiated by Oregon Superintendent of Indian Affairs Joel Palmer. In 1856, they were removed to the Grand Ronde Indian Reservation, joining members of numerous other tribes and bands.

Although the combined tribe was terminated in 1954, members later reorganized. They regained federal recognition in 1983 as of the Confederated Tribes of the Grand Ronde Community of Oregon, to which Mohawk descendants belong. They have a reservation in Yamhill and Polk counties.
