= Marcola School District =

School district in Oregon, United States

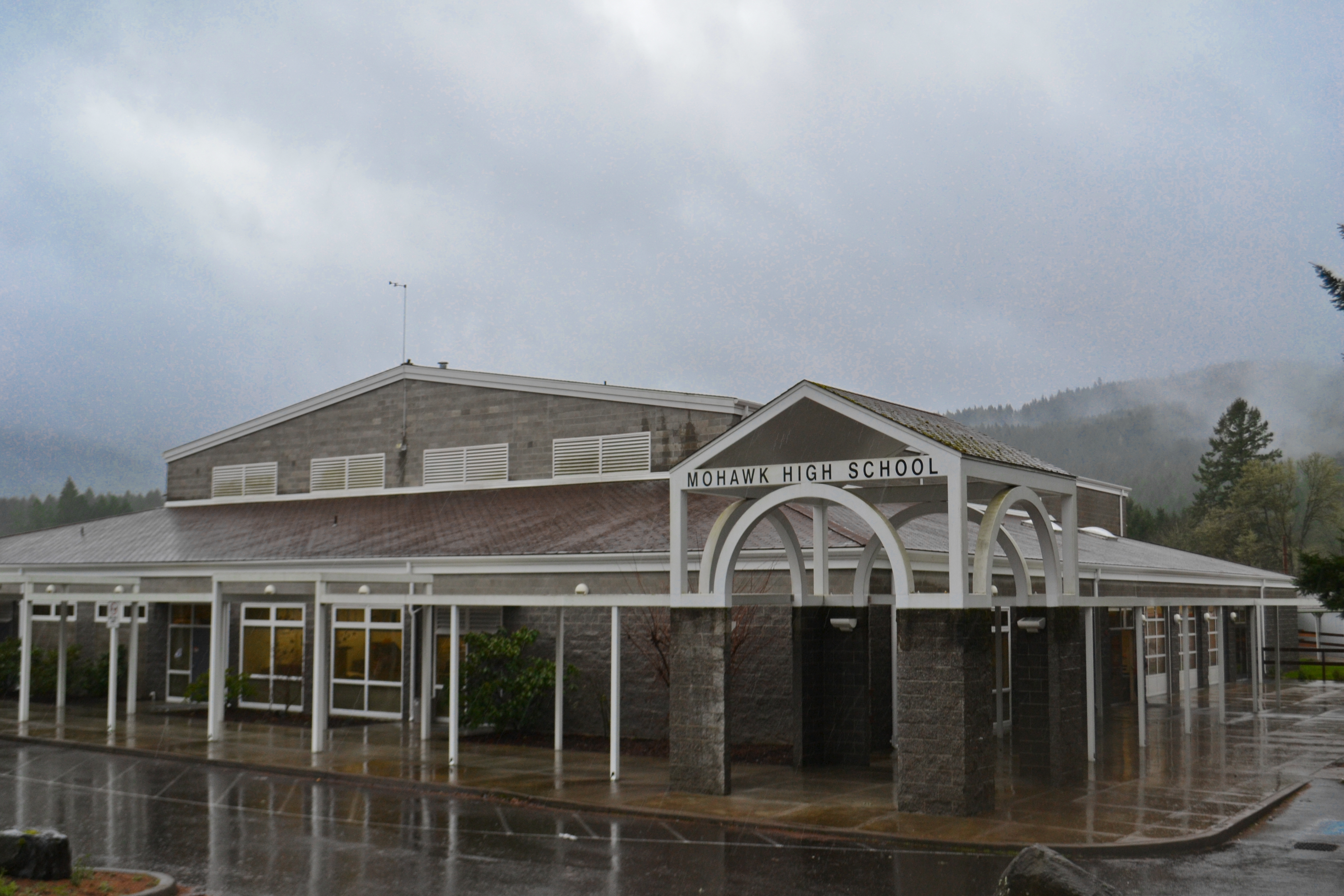
Mohawk High School

Marcola School District 79J is a school district headquartered in Marcola, Oregon.

It includes most of the community of Marcola and various other unincorporated areas in Lane County, Oregon.

== History ==
Circa the decade of the 1900s the district began using the "Mowhawk Indians" as its mascot. Due to the Native American mascot controversy, in 2012 the district changed to a mustang with indigenous imagery. In 2018 a teacher filed a complaint with the Oregon Department of Education over the indigenous theme of the mustang.

In 2020 the district's enrollment was around 300. Due to issues caused by the COVID-19 pandemic in Oregon, the district set up an online learning program established by the superintendent, Bill Watkins, who had previously implemented similar such programs in Alaska.

== Schools ==
- Mohawk High School
- Mohawk Middle School
- Marcola Elementary School
