= Mill Creek (Mohawk River tributary) =

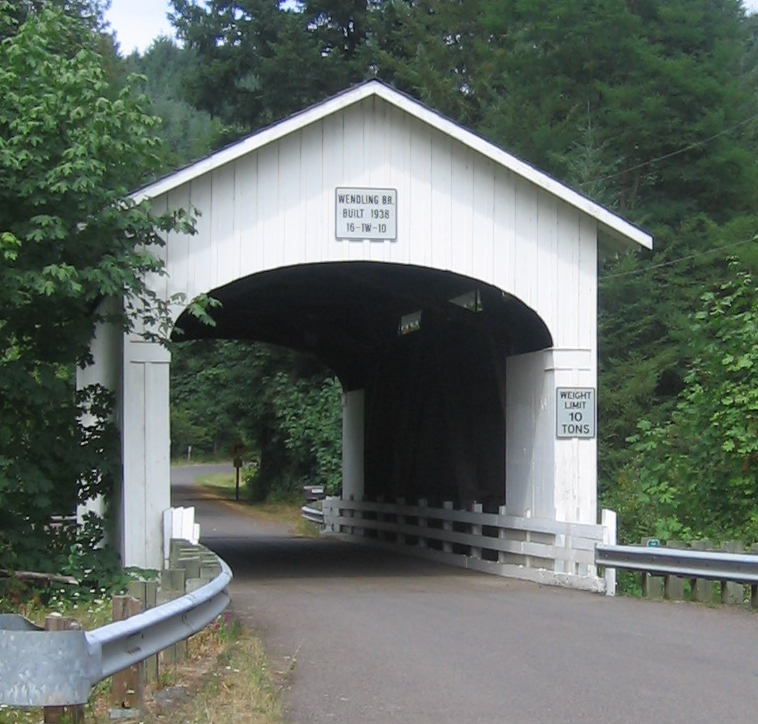
- Wendling Bridge over Mill Creek

- Location of the mouth of Mill Creek in Oregon

Location
- Country: United States
- State: Oregon
- County: Lane

Physical characteristics
- Source: Cascade Range foothills
  - location: northeast of Springfield
  - coordinates: 44°11′26″N 122°38′09″W
  - elevation: 2,890 ft (880 m)
- Mouth: Mohawk River
  - location: near Marcola
  - coordinates: 44°11′24″N 122°50′20″W
  - elevation: 558 ft (170 m)

Mill Creek is a tributary of the Mohawk River in Lane County in the U.S. state of Oregon. It begins in the foothills of the Cascade Range northeast of Springfield and flows generally west through Wendling to meet the river near Marcola. The confluence is about 13 river miles (21 km) from the Mohawk's mouth on the McKenzie River. Mill Creek's named tributaries from source to mouth are Straight, Nebo, Deer, Oshkosh, and Wolf creeks.

A 60-foot (18 m) covered bridge called Wendling Bridge carries Wendling Road over Mill Creek in Wendling. Built in 1938, the bridge was added to the National Register of Historic Places in 1979.

== See also ==
- List of rivers of Oregon
