= Mohawk High School =

Mohawk High School may refer to one of these high schools in the United States:

- Mohawk High School (Sycamore, Ohio)
- Mohawk High School (Marcola, Oregon)
- Mohawk High School (Pennsylvania)
