= Treaty of Dayton =

The Treaty of Dayton may refer to:

- Dayton Agreement, a peace agreement for Bosnia and Herzegovina made in Dayton, Ohio
- Treaty with the Kalapuya, etc., a U.S./Native American treaty made in Dayton, Oregon
