= Wendling Bridge =

Covered bridge in Oregon, US

- U.S. National Register of Historic Places
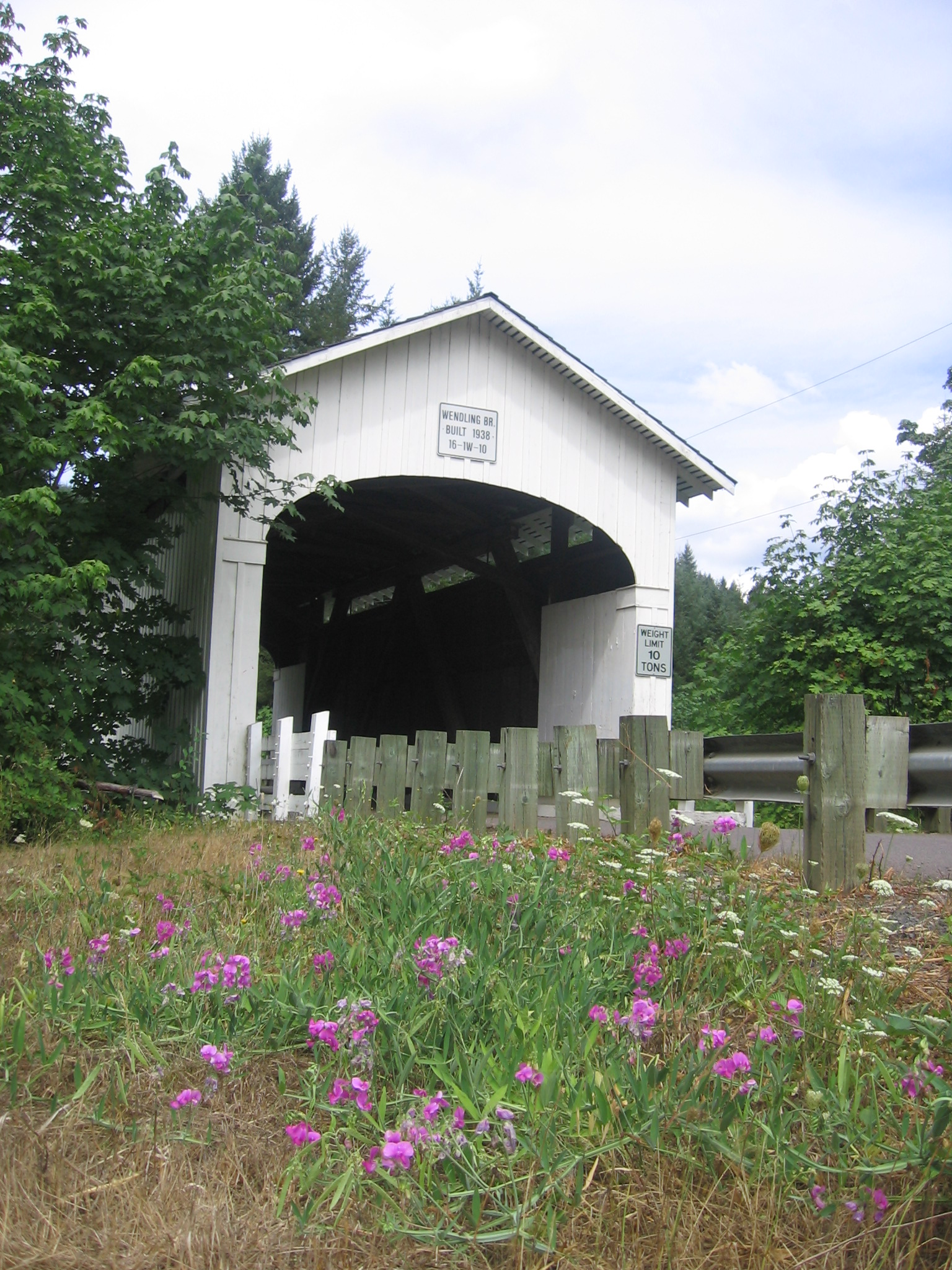

- Location within Oregon Location within the United States
- Nearest city: Marcola, Oregon
- Coordinates: 44.1914°N 122.7989°W
- Area: 0.1 acres (0.040 ha)
- Built: 1938
- Architectural style: Howe Truss
- MPS: Oregon Covered Bridges TR
- NRHP reference No.: 79002095
- Added to NRHP: November 29, 1979

The Wendling Bridge is a covered bridge in Lane County in the U.S. state of Oregon. The 60-foot (18 m) Howe truss structure carries Wendling Road over Mill Creek in the unincorporated community of Wendling. Built in 1938, the bridge was added to the National Register of Historic Places in 1979.

Lane County built four covered bridges, including the Wendling Bridge, in 1938. The others are the Pengra, Goodpasture Bridge, and Earnest bridges. A. C. Striker was then the county bridge superintendent.

Notable features of the bridge include semi-elliptical portal arches and ribbon openings at the eaves. The structure was named for the town, which had been named after George X. Wendling, a San Francisco millionaire who provided the largest investment into Booth-Kelly's expansion in the Mohawk valley in 1899.

== See also ==
- List of bridges on the National Register of Historic Places in Oregon
- National Register of Historic Places listings in Lane County, Oregon
