= SS Joel Palmer =

World War II Liberty ship of the United States

History

United States
- Name: Joel Palmer
- Namesake: Oregon Pioneer, Joel Palmer
- Builder: Oregon Shipbuilding Corporation, Portland, Oregon
- Yard number: 2025
- Laid down: 6 May 1943
- Launched: 5 June 1943
- Completed: 13 June 1943 (37 days)
- Out of service: September 1964
- Fate: Scrapped

General characteristics
- Tonnage: 7,176 GRT 10,600 DWT Bale (cubic capacity): 490,000
- Displacement: 14,245 tons
- Length: 441.5 ft (134.6 m)
- Beam: 57 ft (17 m)
- Draft: 28 ft (8.5 m)
- Propulsion: two 220 PSI boilers, a single three cylinder triple-expansion reciprocating engine, single 4 blade, 18' 6" propeller, Shaft Horsepower, 2,500. (Engine Builder: Filer & Stowell Company, Milwaukee, Wisconsin)
- Speed: 11 knots (20 km/h)
- Complement: 39

SS Joel Palmer was a Liberty Ship used in World War II by the U.S. to transport troops, supplies, munitions, weapons mostly in Australia, Philippines, Papua New Guinea, and Indonesia. The ship was named after Oregon Pioneer Joel Palmer (1810–1881). Joel Palmer was operated under a charter with the Maritime Commission and War Shipping Administration by the American Mail Line.

She was built in 1943 at the Oregon Shipbuilding Corporation in the St. Johns neighborhood of Portland, Oregon. She made at least 12 port calls from August 1943 to May 1945.

Port	Departure	Convoy	Destination	Duration (days)
Sydney	August 26, 1943	GP.65/1	Brisbane	4
Caloundra	August 30, 1943	QL.9	Townsville	3
Townsville	September 7, 1943	TN.153	Port Moresby	5
Milne Bay	September 24, 1943	FT.28	Cairns	3
Caloundra	October 9, 1943	QL.19	Townsville	4
Townsville	October 14, 1943	TN.168	Port Moresby	5
Port Moresby	October 26, 1943	NT.63	Cairns	2
Townsville	November 7, 1943	TN.176	Milne Bay	5
Townsville	November 29, 1943	TN.184	Milne Bay	5
Milne Bay	December 24, 1943	BG.3	Oro Bay	2
Finschhafen	January 14, 1944	GB.2	Milne Bay	3
Leyte	May 14, 1945	IG.22	Hollandia	7
