= Palmer House (Dayton, Oregon) =

Building in Dayton, Oregon, U.S.

- U.S. National Register of Historic Places
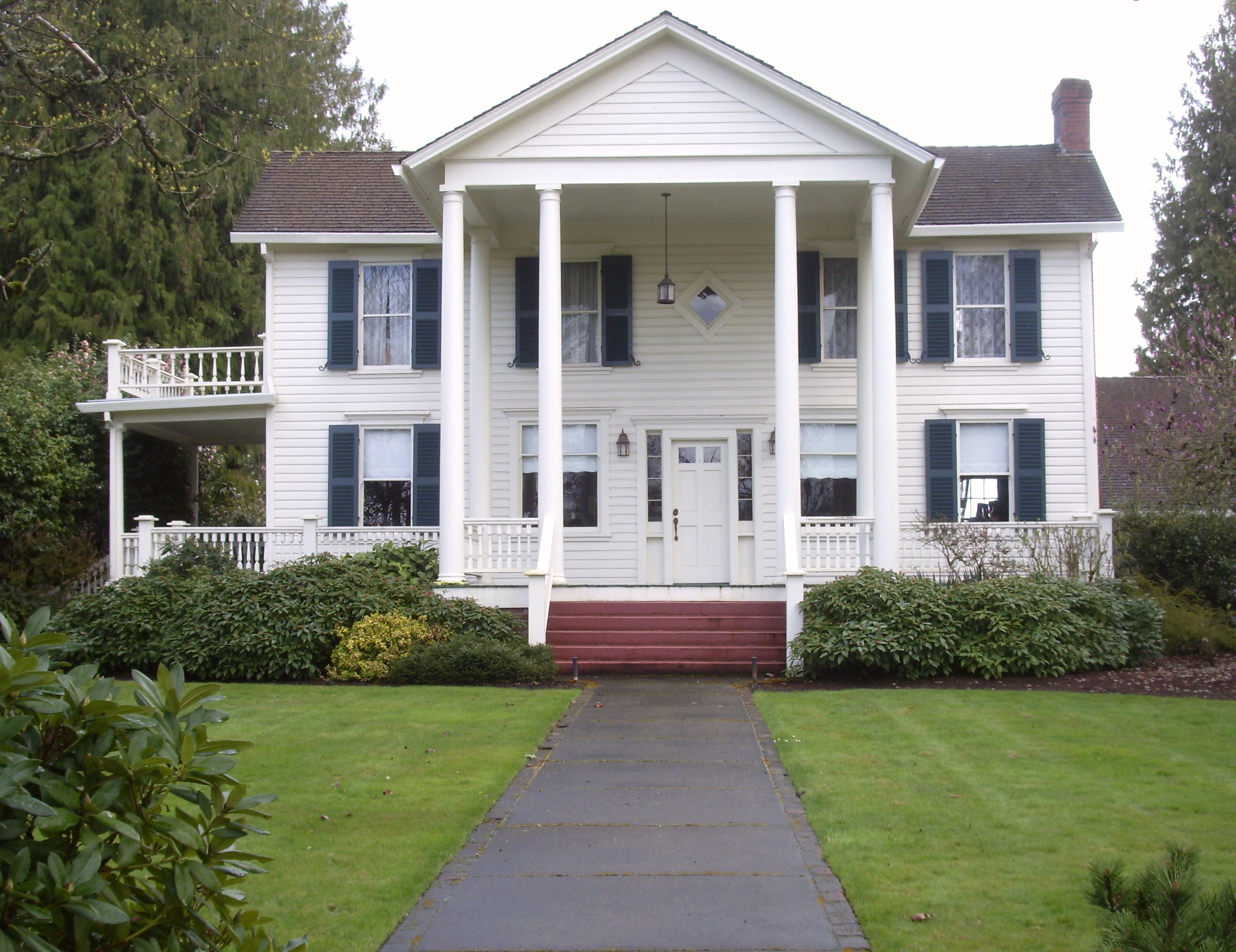
- Front of Palmer House, seen from Ferry Street

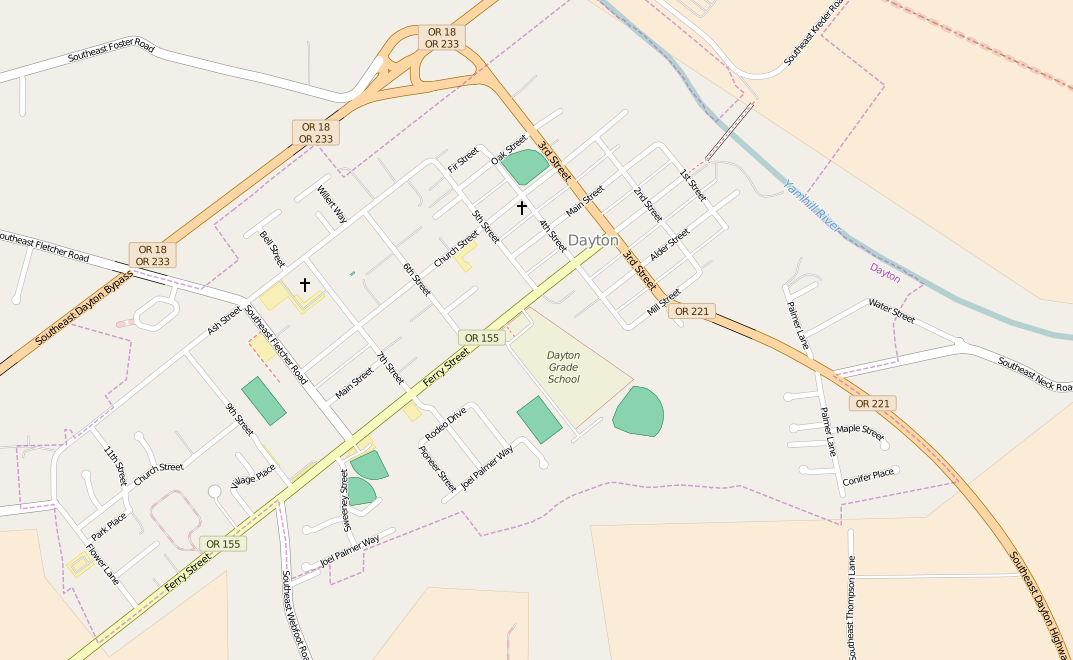
- Location within Dayton OR Location within Oregon Location within the United States
- Location: 600 Ferry Street; Dayton, Oregon
- Coordinates: 45°13′05″N 123°04′47″W
- Area: 4.1 acres (1.7 ha)
- Built: 1857
- Architect: (unknown)
- Architectural style: Classical Revival
- MPS: Dayton MRA
- NRHP reference No.: 87000403
- Added to NRHP: March 16, 1987

The Palmer House (also Joel Palmer House and Krake Residence) is the historic residence of Oregon pioneer Joel Palmer (1810–81), who co-founded Dayton, Oregon, United States.

The house, located at 600 Ferry Street in Dayton, is one of Oregon's finest historic homes. It has been on the National Register of Historic Places since March 16, 1987, and is on the Oregon Historic Register. It was the first of 48 Dayton properties to be listed and is the town's oldest standing structure.

== History ==
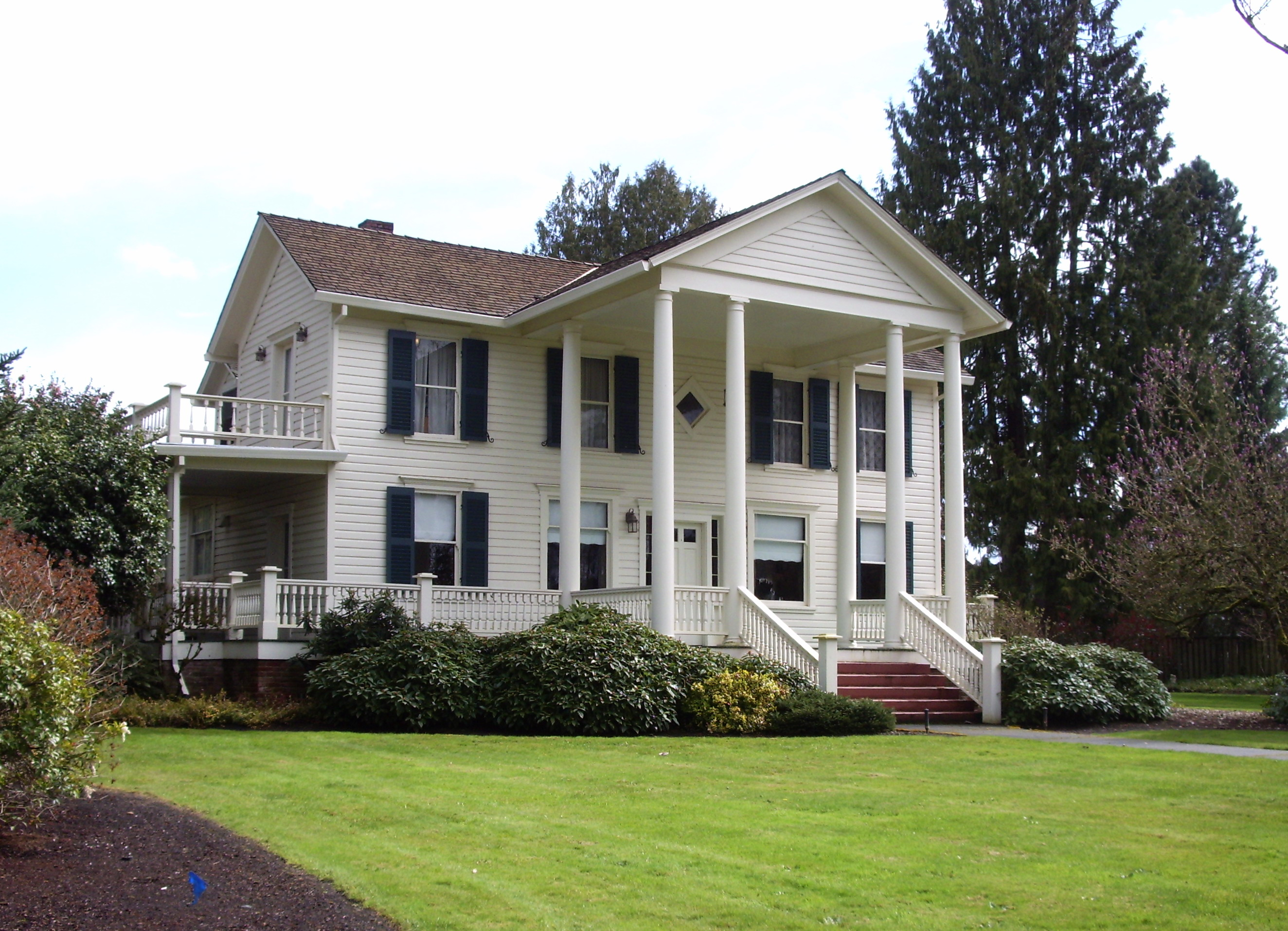
Side-front view

Shortly after arriving in the Oregon Country in 1845, Palmer filed a donation land claim for himself in the Corvallis area, and one for his brother-in-law in the Dayton area. Palmer returned to Indiana for his family and came to Oregon again in 1847, to find that his land claim had been jumped. His brother-in-law decided not to return to Oregon, so Palmer settled that claim instead, located about six miles (10 km) south of Dayton.

Palmer was called away around December 15, 1847, to be Commissary General of the Military Forces of Oregon Territory to handle the Cayuse War at the Whitman Mission, and afterward left for the California Gold Rush. During his absence, his daughter Sarah married Andrew Smith and settled on Smith's land claim at the mouth of the Yam Hill River [sic].

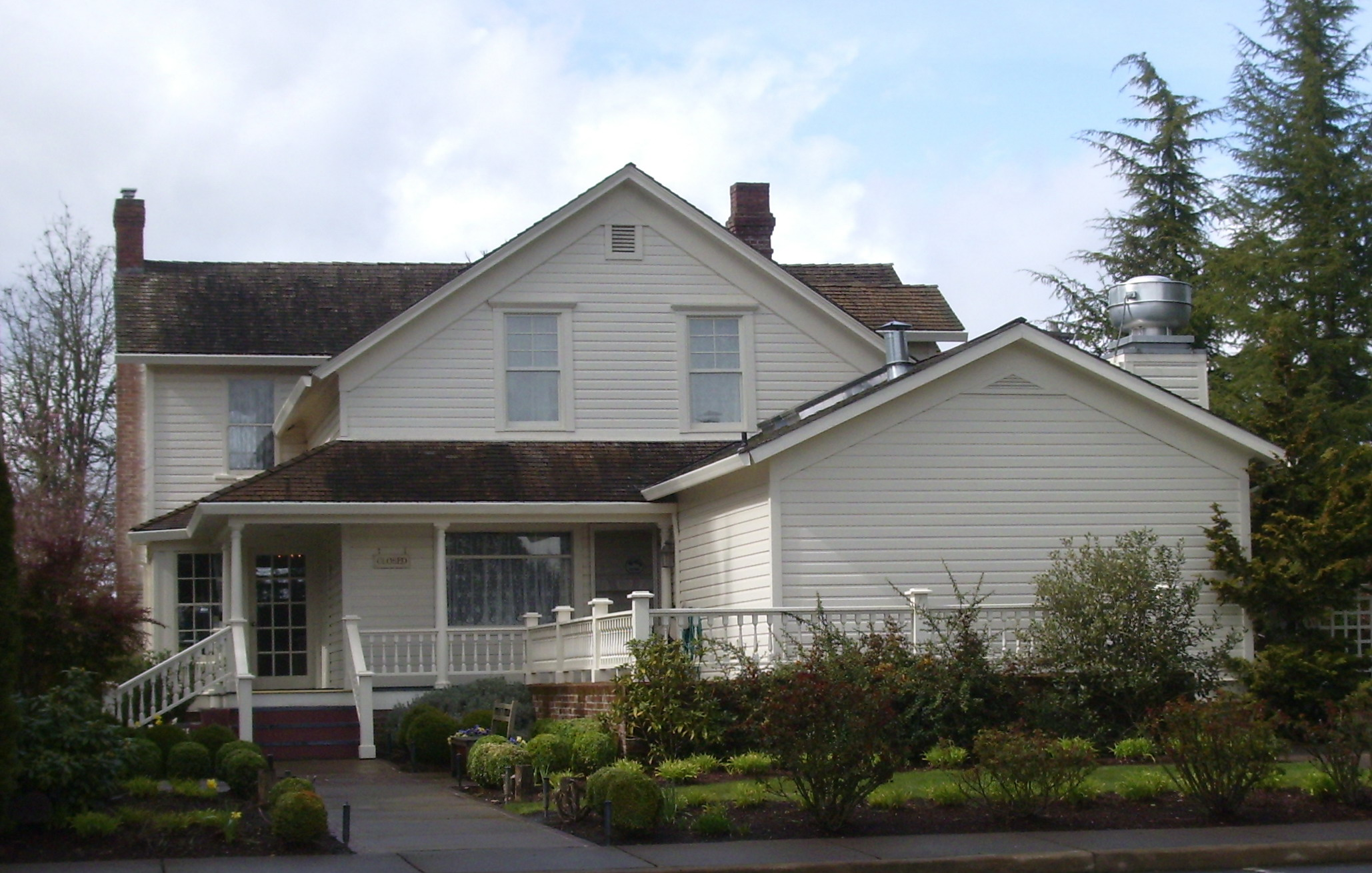
Rear entrance — restaurant's main entrance

When Palmer returned in February 1850, he purchased part of Smith's land and merged it with his brother-in-law's, Palmer's son's and daughter-in-law's to form a 465-acre (188 ha) tract which he platted to be Dayton.

The first building and Palmer's home was a hotel in the center of the newly platted area. He kept it for a few years, but then built Palmer House near the town's outskirts in 1852 or 1857. The house has survived several floods and at least one major fire.

The house is located near the mouth of the Yamhill River at the Willamette River, and near Palmer Creek (previously known as Smith Creek), which was of early interest for powering machinery. Palmer operated a sawmill, a hotel, and several other enterprises.

Since 1996, the house has functioned as an upscale restaurant featuring creative local cuisine.
