= Mohawk River (Oregon) =

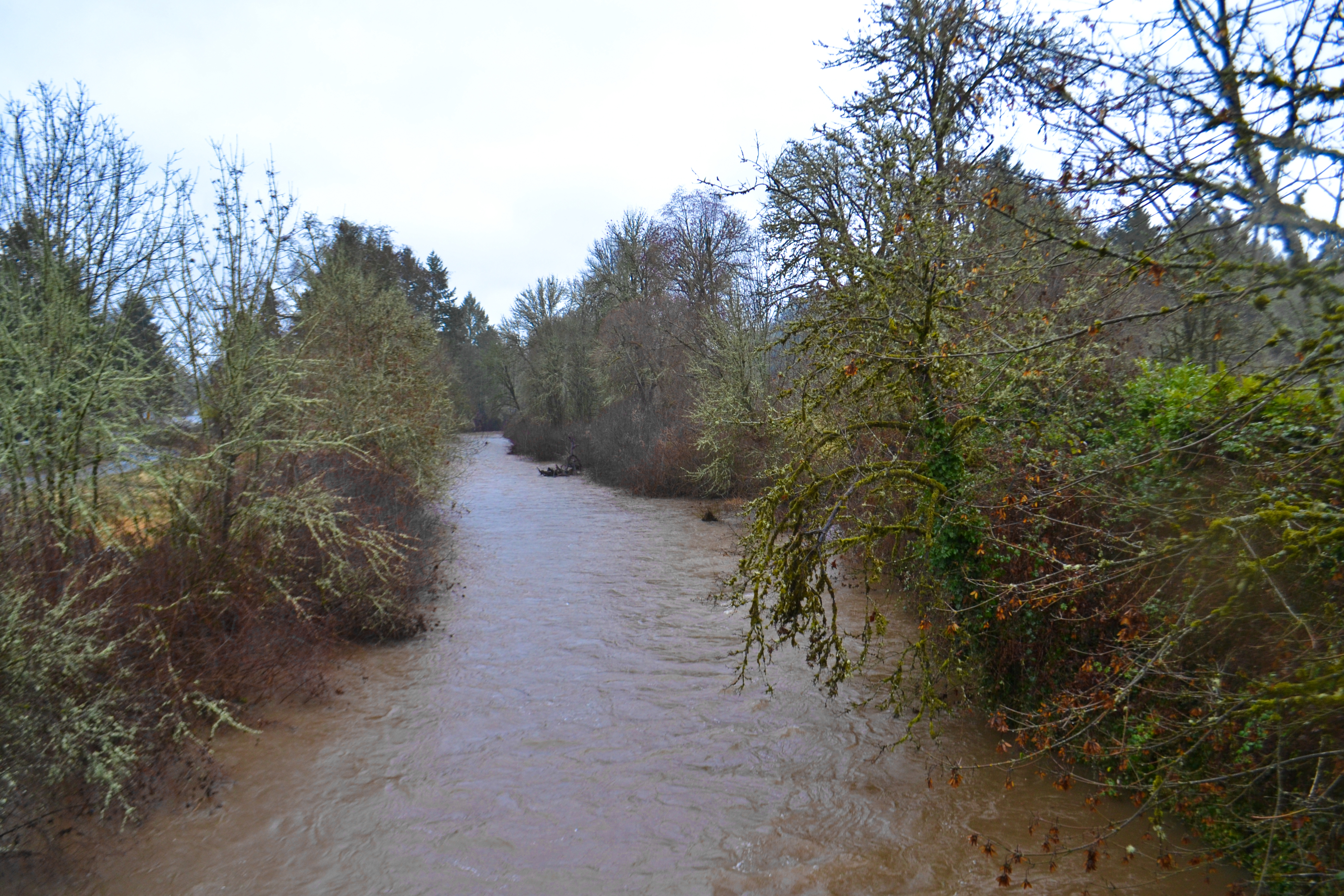
- High water on the Mohawk River during January storm

- Location of the mouth of the Mohawk River in Oregon

Location
- Country: United States
- State: Oregon
- County: Lane

Physical characteristics
- Source: Confluence of North and South Forks
  - coordinates: 44°13′37″N 122°40′11″W
- Mouth: McKenzie River
  - coordinates: 44°5′10″N 122°58′30″W
  - elevation: 449 ft (137 m)
- Length: 30 mi (48 km)
- Basin size: 180 sq mi (470 km^{2})

The Mohawk River is the largest tributary of the McKenzie River, approximately 30 miles (48 km) long, in west central Oregon in the United States. It drains part of the foothills of the Cascade Range on the southeast end of the Willamette Valley northeast of Springfield.

It rises in northern Lane County, approximately 12 miles (19 km) northeast of Springfield. It flows generally southwest and enters the McKenzie from the north on the north side of Springfield. The river's valley is known as the Mohawk Valley.

The Mohawk River was probably given its name by Jacob C. Spores in 1849. Spores was a native of the Mohawk River region of New York, and the Oregon river's valley reminded him of the Mohawk Valley in his home state. In turn, the Oregon river gave its name to the Mohawk River band of Kalapuyan Native Americans who inhabited the river valley in the 19th century. They are not related to the Mohawk tribe in the eastern United States.

Current and former settlements in the Mohawk Valley include Mabel, Marcola, Mohawk, and Wendling.

Named tributaries from source to mouth are North Fork Mohawk River and South Fork Mohawk River followed by Log, Bette, Drury, Shotgun, Polly, Mill, and Cartwright creeks. Further downstream come Parsons and McGowan creeks, then Alder Branch followed by Spores, Stafford, and Sister creeks.

== See also ==
- List of rivers of Oregon
