= Treaty with the Kalapuya, etc. =

1855 treaty between the United States and Native Americans

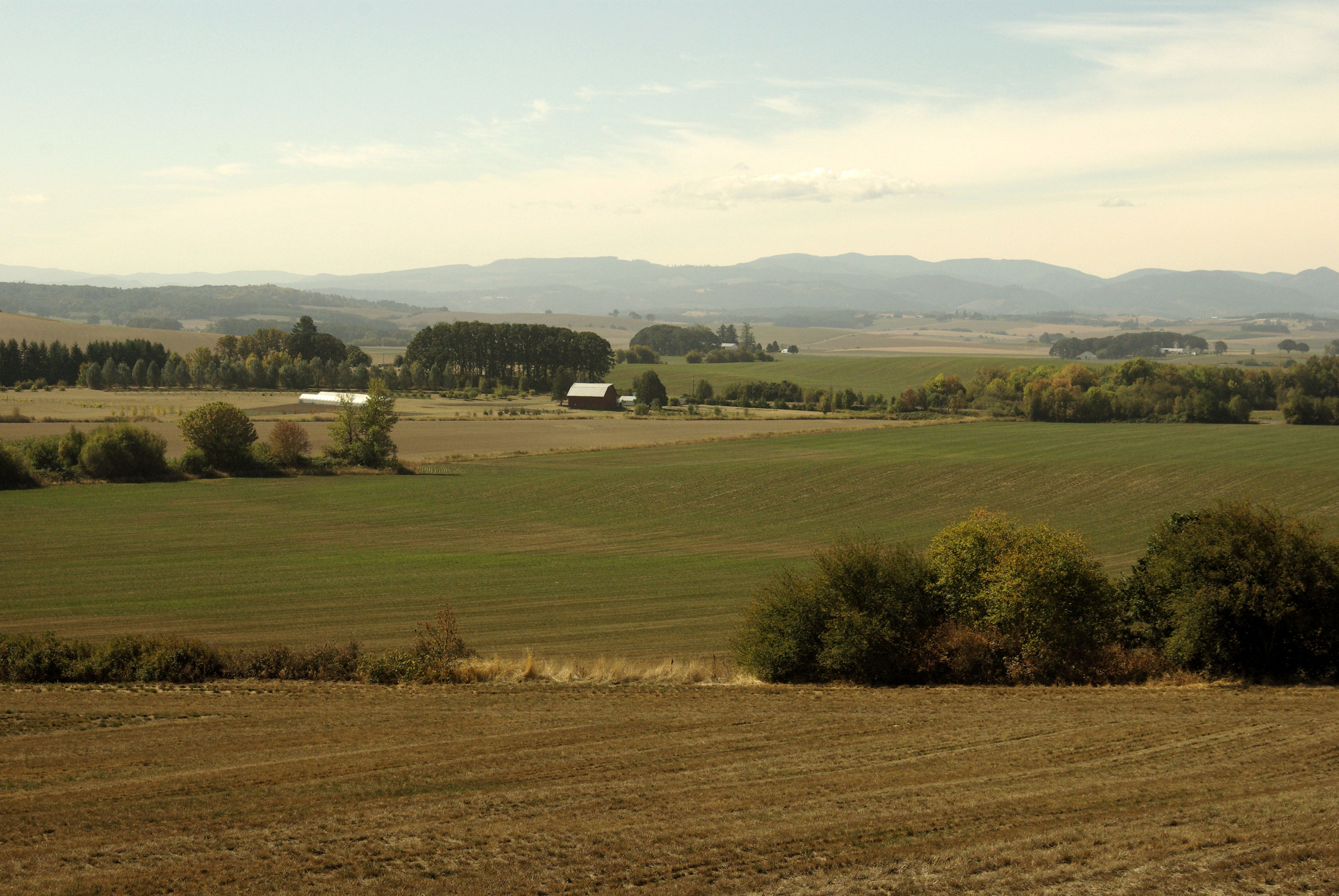
A modern photograph of the Willamette Valley, ceded to the United States in the 1855 Kalapuya Treaty

The Treaty with the Kalapuya, etc., also known as the Kalapuya Treaty or the Treaty of Dayton, was an 1855 treaty between the United States and the bands of the Kalapuya tribe, the Molala tribe, the Clackamas, and several others in the Oregon Territory. In it the tribes were forced to cede land in exchange for promised permanent reservation, annuities, supplies, educational, vocational, health services, and protection from ongoing violence from American settlers. The treaty effectively gave over the entirety of the Willamette Valley to the United States and removed indigenous groups who had resided in the area for over 10,000 years. The treaty was signed on January 22, 1855, in Dayton, Oregon, ratified on March 3, 1855, and proclaimed on April 10, 1855.

It is not to be confused with the Treaty with the Umpqua and Kalapuya of 1854, also known as the Treaty of Calapooia Creek.

== Background ==
In the mid-1830s — partially driven by public interest in the concept of manifest destiny — the option of expanding across North America emerged. Following this, writers began exhorting Congress to occupy the Oregon Territory. This drove some of the first American settlers to the region, and the development of the Oregon Trail began to bring larger numbers to the area by the early 1840s. Unlike California, which was at the time still controlled by Mexico, the lands that later became the Oregon Territory were only tentatively claimed by American or European settlers. Starting in the late 1700s, American and European explorers and settlers introduced a series of diseases, causing epidemics that decimated the populations of the Santiam, Tualatin, Yamhill, Luckiamute Kalapuyan, and other indigenous peoples who lived in the region. By the 1850s, the remaining indigenous population had few options when faced with increased harassment and land encroachment from those who believed that the United States should reach to the Pacific Ocean.

Many of the early American 'settlers' moved to the Willamette Valley, a fertile region drained by the Willamette River, the home to Kalapuyan tribes for over 10,000 years. The Americans were not the first white settlers there; a group of French Canadians, former employees of the Hudson's Bay Company, had made their homes in the French Prairie area of the valley. The Americans who arrived almost immediately began sending petitions and letters back east requesting the United States government to formally claim the area and protect them from real or perceived threats, both from the indigenous residents they were displacing and the British.

These Americans were part of a geopolitical rivalry between the United States and Great Britain over who would control the Oregon Territory, which comprised the modern states of Oregon, Washington, Idaho, a portion of Montana, and the province of British Columbia. In 1846, the two powers concluded the Oregon Treaty, dividing the territory in half, disregarding the indigenous peoples inhabiting the lands. The lands of the Willamette Valley were thereafter part of the Oregon Territory of the United States, even though local tribes had yet to cede their land.

== Treaty ==
Congress appointed its first treaty commission to Native Americans in the region in 1850. Within a year, the commissioners had negotiated agreements with the Santiam, Tualatin, Yamhill, and Luckiamute bands of the Kalapuya. These peoples were forced to give up their lands in return for settlement on a series of reservations. However, before the commission had completed its work, Congress had revoked its credentials, and the treaties were never ratified.

The natives continued to encounter conflict with white settlers. Oregon's early history includes numerous violent incidents between settlers and natives, including the Rogue River War to the south, which occurred in the early 1850s. While conflict in the Willamette Valley was not as overt, small-scale violence between settlers and natives was commonplace. In 1855, Joel Palmer, the Oregon Superintendent of Indian Affairs, concluded a second treaty with the remaining bands of natives. This treaty, generally referred to as the Kalapuya Treaty after the overarching name of the natives in the area, gave almost all of the Willamette Valley to the United States. The natives secured promises in return of a reservation and long-term support from the United States government in the form of money, supplies, health care, and the promise of protection from further attacks by settlers. At the time the treaty was signed, only 400 Kalapuya natives remained, having been reduced by disease and conflict.

In 1855 and 1856, these remaining natives were forcibly resettled in what became the Grand Ronde Reservation, along with members of other native Oregonian groups. The reservation would continue to be served and recognized by the United States government until 1954, when the government terminated its trusteeship with the reservation. However, because the Kalapuya Treaty had been ratified by Congress and was therefore legally enforceable, it was used by the Kalapuya, now one of the Confederated Tribes of the Grand Ronde, to regain federal support in 1983.

== Tribes and bands included ==
According to the text of the treaty, the following bands were included:

- Tualatin band of Calapooias
- Yam Hill band
- Cheluk-i-ma-uke band
- Chep-en-a-pho or Marysville band
- Chem-a-pho or Maddy band
- Che-lam-e-la or Long Tom band
- Mo-lal-la band of Mo-lal-las (Upper Molalla)
- Calapooia band of Calapooias
- Winnefelly and Mohawk bands
- Tekopa band
- Chafan band of the Calapooia tribe
- Wah-lal-la band of Tum-waters
- Clack-a-mas tribe
- Clow-we-wal-la or Willamette Tum-water band
- Santiam bands of Calapooias
