= Wendling, Oregon =

Unincorporated community in the state of Oregon, United States

- Unincorporated community
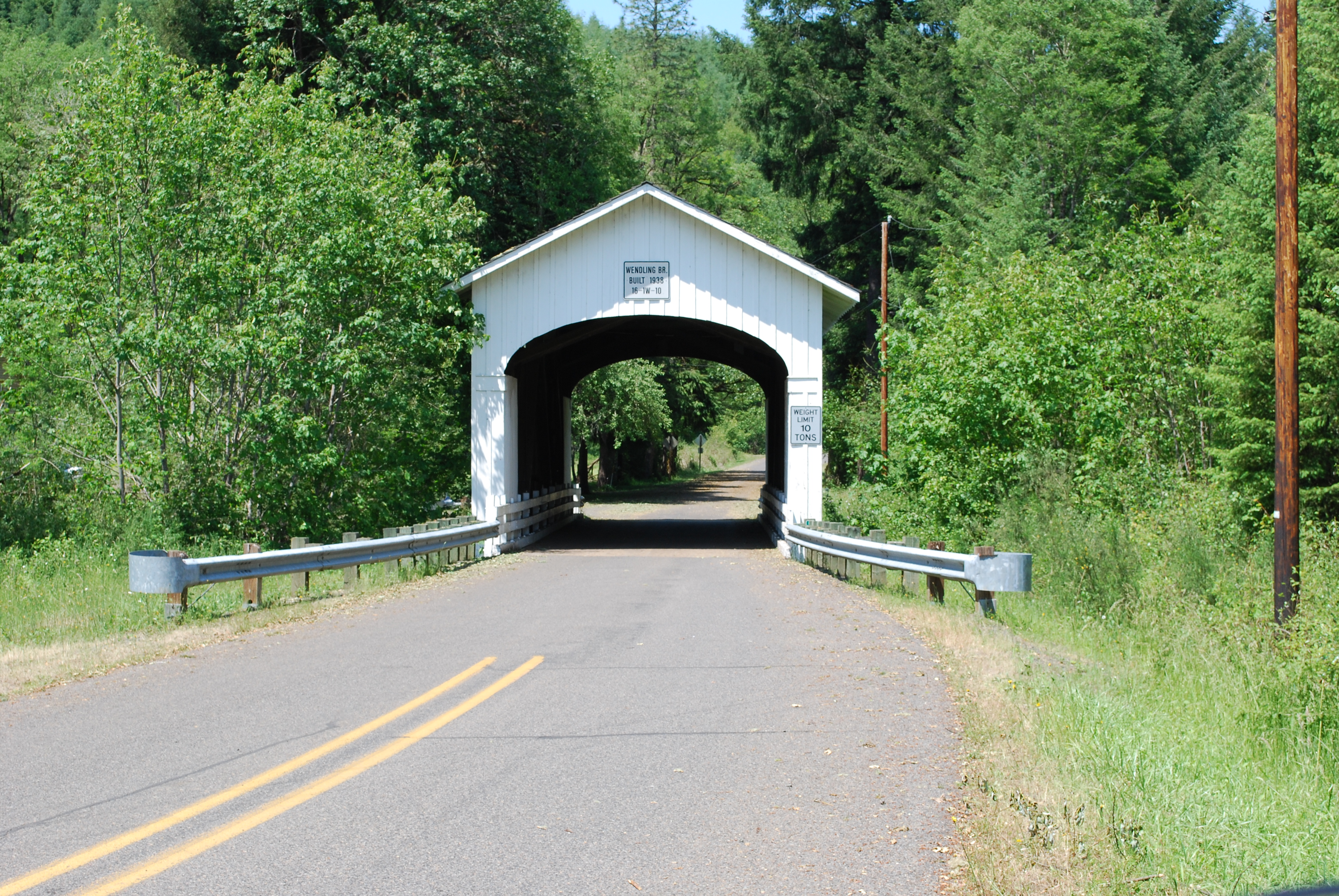
- Wendling Bridge, a covered bridge over Mill Creek

- Location within Oregon Location within the United States
- Coordinates: 44°11′25″N 122°47′54″W
- Country: United States
- State: Oregon
- County: Lane
- Elevation: 646 ft (197 m)
- Time zone: UTC-8 (Pacific (PST))
  - Summer (DST): UTC-7 (PDT)
- ZIP code: 97454
- Area codes: 458 and 541
- GNIS feature ID: 1136886

Wendling is an unincorporated community in Lane County, Oregon, United States, located northeast of Marcola. Wendling's post office operated from 1899 to 1952. The town was named for George X. Wendling, a San Francisco investor, who was the largest investor in Booth-Kelly's expansion into the Mohawk. Wendling was created as a company town for the Booth-Kelly Lumber Company.

== History ==
Initially, Booth-Kelly had no intention of building Wendling, The original plan was use the Mohawk River to float logs to a new mill near Coburg. Lane County granted them a 90 year franchise for movement on the river. This met with harsh resistance from the other valley mills, loggers and farmers.

Booth-Kelly then decided to build a mill and supporting elements near the timber. To do this they needed to acquire the right-of-way for the Southern Pacific railroad from Springfield to their proposed site on the former homestead of William McCullough. It was secured and Wendling mill and supporting structures were built in the fall of 1899 while railroad construction was underway. The railroad was finished and the first train came into Wendling on September 3, 1900.

=== Fires ===
On the night of August 24–25, 1910 embers falling from a nearby forest fire destroyed all but three homes in the company-owned residential section of Wendling, the church, school, cookhouse and bunkhouse. The mill, store, and company offices were saved. Booth-Kelly rebuilt within two months and kept the mill and camps running during that time.

In the morning hours of September 26, 1917, the planer mill and dry sheds were burned to the ground. The sawmill and other structures were saved.

During the forenoon of July 6, 1922, the saw mill and nearby kilns were destroyed by fire.

Months after the mill was closed at Wendling and nearly all equipment was stripped from its interior, the mill superstructures and the powerhouse burned in a fire on September 29, 1946. No other buildings were lost.

=== Other ===
Wendling Bridge, a covered bridge, carries Wendling Road over Mill Creek at Wendling. Built in 1938, the bridge was added to the National Register of Historic Places in 1979.

== See also ==
- Hayden Bridge (Springfield, Oregon) – bridge that was part of the Marcola line, which would take lumber to and from Wendling
