= Kalapuyan languages =

Language family

Kalapuya
- Geographic distribution: Northwest Oregon
- Ethnicity: Kalapuya people
- Extinct: c. 1954, with the death of John B. Hudson (Central)
- Linguistic classification: Penutian ?: Kalapuya
- Subdivisions: Northern; Central; Yoncalla

Language codes
- Glottolog: kala1402
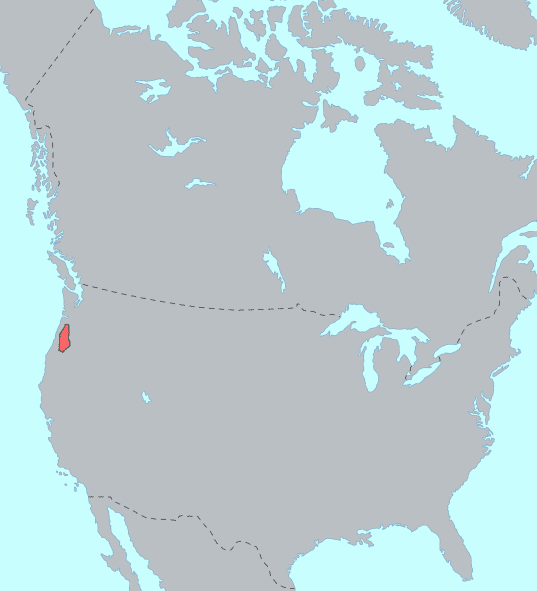

Kalapuyan (also Kalapuya) is a small extinct language family that was spoken in the Willamette Valley of Western Oregon, United States. It consists of three languages.

The Kalapuya language is currently in a state of revival. Kalapuya descendants in the southernmost Kalapuya region of Yoncalla, Oregon, published 100 copies of a comprehensive dictionary, with plans to expand.

== Family division ==
Kalapuyan consists of

- Kalapuyan
  - † Northern Kalapuya (also known as Tualatin–Yamhill)
  - † Central Kalapuya (several dialects, including Santiam)
  - † Yoncalla (also known as Southern Kalapuya)

== Genetic relations ==
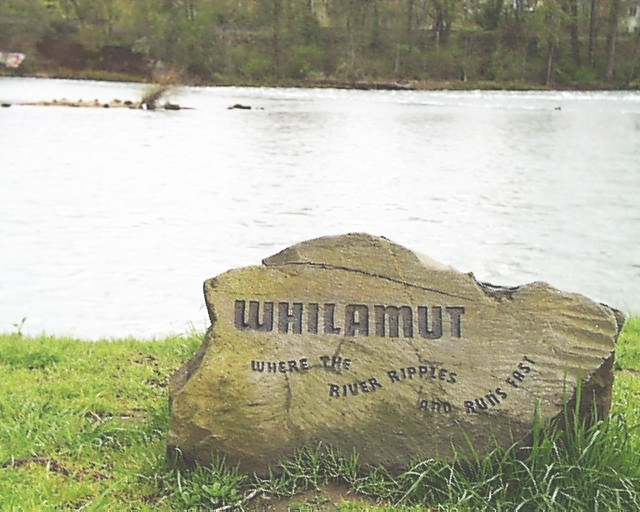
One of the boulders engraved with Kalapuyan words along the paths of east Alton Baker Park in Eugene, Oregon; this one is next to the Willamette River: Whilamut (meaning, Where the river ripples and runs fast)

Kalapuyan is usually connected with the various Penutian proposals. This was originally part of an Oregon Penutian branch along with Takelma, Siuslaw, Alsea and Coosan. A special relationship with Takelma had been proposed, together forming a "Takelma–Kalapuyan" or "Takelman" family. However, an unpublished paper by Tarpent & Kendall (1998) finds this relationship to be unfounded because of the extremely different morphological structures of Takelma and Kalapuyan.

== Proto-language ==
Proto-Kalapuyan
- Reconstruction of: Kalapuyan_languages

Below is a list of Proto-Kalapuyan reconstructions by Shipley (1970):

no.	gloss	Proto-Kalapuyan
1	all	*pu-
2	bad	*khaskha
3	big	*pala
4	bird	*twi(ː)ca
5	bite	*yiːk
6	black	*muː
7	blood	*nu
8	blow	*puː-
9	bone	*ca
10	burn	*y-
11	cold	*tuːku
12	come	*ma-
13	come	-
14	cut	-
15	dig	*hu-
16	dog	*tal
17	drink	*kʷh-
18	dry	*chakkaluː
19	dull	*tu-
20	dust	*skuːp
21	earth	*nuwa
22	eat	*kʷVnafu
23	egg	*pha
24	eye	*kʷhillaːk, *kʷhalliːk
25	fall	
26	father	*-fa-
27	father	*maːma
28	fear	*n-
29	fear	*yakla
30	feather	*lunka
31	few	*puː(n)
32	five	*waːn
33	flower	*puːk
34	four	*tapa
35	fruit	*kayna
36	give	*tiː
37	good	*suː
38	grass	*luːkʷa
39	green	*ci-
40	guts	*niːya
41	hair, head	*kʷaː
42	hand	*laːkʷa
43	he	*kʷawk
44	hear	*kapt
45	heart	*-uːpna
46	heavy	*kayt
47	hot	*ʔuːk
48	I	*chi
49	ice	*tic
50	kill	*tah-
51	know	*yukhu
52	lake	*paːɫ
53	leaf	*takhVɫ
54	left	*kay
55	liver	*paw
56	long	*puːs
57	louse	*t-
58	man	*ʔuːyhi
59	many	-
60	meat	*muːkhi, *muːkʷhi
61	mother	*naːna
62	mountain	*maːfuː
64	name	*kʷat
65	neck	*puː- -k
66	new	*pa(n)ɫa
67	nose	*nuːna
68	not	*waːnk
69	old	*yuː(k)
70	one	-
71	other	*wana
72	path	*kawni
73	person	*mim
74	pierce	*twa-
75	push	*t-
76	red	*c- -l
77	river	*cal
78	rope	*cal
79	round	*(wi)luː
80	saliva	*ta(w)f
81	say	*na(ka)
82	sea	*minlak
83	see	*huːthu
84	sew	*-aːkʷaː(t)
85	short	*-u(w)pna
86	sing	*kawt
87	sit	*tastu
88	sit	*yuː
89	sky	*yank
90	sleep, lie	*way
91	smell	*h-
92	snake	*(t)kaː
93	snow	*-uː(p)paː(y)k
94	split	*plVk
95	stand	*taːp
96	stone	*taː
97	straight	*yalk
98	suck	-
99	sun	*pyan
100	swell	*kuːf
101	swim	*kʷay(n)
102	tail	*tkuː
103	they	*k(ʷ)i(n)nVk
104	thick	*fip
105	thin	*kliʔk
106	think	*m- -t
107	this	*kʷus(a)
108	this	*haːs(a)
109	thou	*maː(ha)
110	three	*psin
111	throw	*kawi
112	tie	*takt
113	tongue	-
114	tooth	*ti
115	tree	*watVk
116	two	*kaːmi
117	walk	*ʔiːti
118	wash	*kaw(a)ɫ
119	wash	*cawC
120	water	*pk(y)aː
121	we	*stuː
122	what	*ʔa(k)kaː
123	white	*maw
124	wind	*-iːʈwa
125	wing	*wa(ː)n
126	ye	*mV(t)tiː
127	year	*miːcwa
