= 1870 Oregon gubernatorial election =

- June 6, 1870
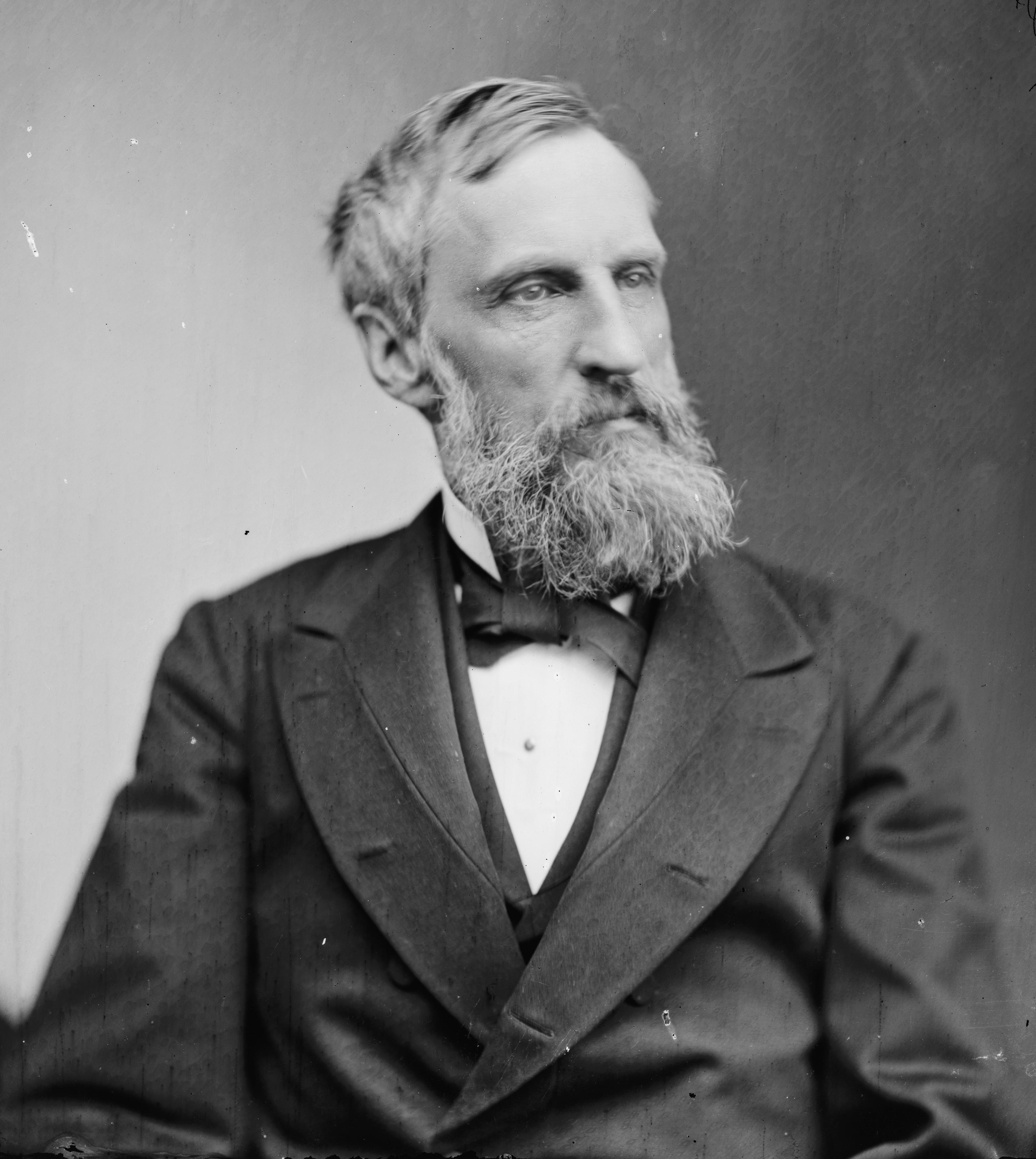

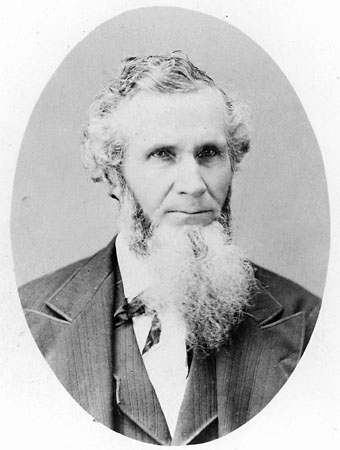
Nominee	La Fayette Grover	Joel Palmer
Party	Democratic	Republican
Popular vote	11,726	11,095
Percentage	51.38%	48.62%
- County results Grover: 50–60% 60–70% Palmer: 50–60%
Governor before election
George L. Woods
Republican
Elected Governor
La Fayette Grover
Democratic

The 1870 Oregon gubernatorial election took place on June 6, 1870, to elect the governor of the U.S. state of Oregon. The election matched Republican Joel Palmer against Democrat La Fayette Grover.

== Results ==
1870 Oregon gubernatorial election
Party	Candidate	Votes	%	±%
Democratic	La Fayette Grover	11,726	51.38%	+2.06%
Republican	Joel Palmer	11,095	48.62%	−2.06%
Total votes		22,822	100.00%	
Majority		630	2.76%	
Democratic gain from Republican		Swing	+4.12%	

=== Results by county ===
County	La Fayette Grover Democratic		Joel Palmer Republican		Margin		Total votes cast
County	#	%	#	%	#	%	Total votes cast
Baker	579	59.02%	402	40.98%	177	18.04%	981
Benton	578	48.78%	607	51.22%	-29	-2.45%	1,185
Clackamas	698	48.01%	756	51.99%	-58	-3.99%	1,454
Clatsop	123	40.73%	179	59.27%	-56	-18.54%	302
Columbia	152	64.14%	85	35.86%	67	28.27%	237
Coos	261	50.10%	260	49.90%	1	0.19%	521
Curry	76	41.76%	106	58.24%	-30	-16.48%	182
Douglas	786	51.57%	738	48.43%	48	3.15%	1,524
Grant	373	53.75%	321	46.25%	52	7.49%	694
Jackson	793	61.81%	490	38.19%	303	23.62%	1,283
Josephine	209	61.65%	130	38.35%	79	23.30%	339
Lane	831	54.10%	705	45.90%	126	8.20%	1,536
Linn	1,204	56.18%	939	43.82%	265	12.37%	2,143
Marion	1,068	44.32%	1,342	55.68%	-274	-11.37%	2,410
Multnomah	1,023	42.01%	1,412	57.99%	-389	-15.98%	2,435
Polk	661	52.46%	599	47.54%	62	4.92%	1,260
Tillamook	49	43.36%	64	56.64%	-15	-13.27%	113
Umatilla	509	66.89%	252	33.11%	257	33.77%	761
Union	418	63.91%	236	36.09%	182	27.83%	654
Wasco	349	50.58%	341	49.42%	8	1.16%	690
Washington	355	42.26%	485	57.74%	-130	-15.48%	840
Yamhill	631	49.37%	647	50.63%	-16	-1.25%	1,278
Total	11,726	51.38%	11,096	48.62%	630	2.76%	22,822

==== Counties that flipped from Republican to Democratic ====
- Coos
- Douglas
- Grant
