= Takelma–Kalapuyan languages =

Proposed language family

Takelma–Kalapuyan
- Takelman
- (proposed)
- Geographic distribution: Oregon
- Linguistic classification: Penutian ?: Takelma–Kalapuyan
- Subdivisions: Takelma †; Kalapuyan †

Language codes
- Glottolog: None

The Takelma–Kalapuyan languages (also Takelman) are a proposed small language family that comprises the Kalapuyan languages and Takelma, which were spoken in the Willamette Valley and the Rogue Valley in the U.S. state of Oregon.

== Proposal ==
The idea of a special relation between Takelma and the Kalapuyan languages was first developed by Leo Frachtenberg (1918), who listed 55 lexical correspondences between Takelma and Central Kalapuya. Based on Frachtenberg's observations, Edward Sapir (1921) included both Takelma and Kalapuyan in his extended version of the Penutian "stock", listing them however as individual members without positing a special relationship between the two.

The first explicit proposal for a family comprising only Takelma and Kalapuyan (as member of the Penutian "stock") was made by Morris Swadesh (1965) in a lexicostatistic study, who found a lexical similarity of 48% between Takelma and Kalapuyan, although this figure was based on rather bold assumptions about lexical matches. Shipley (1969) made the first attempt towards establishing regular sound correspondences by strictly applying the comparative method, and listed sixty-five preliminary reconstructions for "Proto-Takelman". Further lexical cognate sets were given by Berman (1988), while Kendall (1997) presented phonological and morphological correspondences.

== Reception ==
Lyle Campbell (1997) considered the proposed Takelma-Kalapuyan hypothesis "highly likely, if not fully demonstrated", and listed them as a single subgroup in an overview of Native American language families that is otherwise characterized by a very critical stance against wide-range proposals. Takelma-Kalapuyan is also tentatively accepted by Victor Golla (2011).

In an unpublished, but widely cited conference paper, Tarpent and Kendall (1998) critically evaluated the evidence for Takelma-Kalapuyan, and concluded that a grouping which exclusively comprises Takelma and Kalapuyan is not justified, and that features shared between the two have to be assessed in a wider Penutian context (a similar position was taken before by Silverstein (1979)). Marianne Mithun (1999) accepts Tarpent and Kendall's findings, but remains sceptical about the validity of the Penutian hypothesis, and therefore lists Takelma as a language isolate and Kalapuyan as a primary language family.

Grant (2002) maintains that even though the relation between Takelma and Kalapuyan is not as close as previously assumed, Tarpent and Kendall's discussion does not invalidate the hypothesis that Takelma and Kalapuyan are "each other's closest genetic relatives", albeit only at an extremely distant level.

== Prehistory ==
The Kalapuyan languages and Takelma were spoken in two discontiguous areas: while Kalapuyan speakers inhabited the Willamette Valley, Takelma speakers lived in the Rogue Valley in the southernmost part of Oregon. In between, the Athabaskan Upper Umpqua language was spoken. This suggests that Takelma was initially spoken in the direct neighborhood of the Kalapuyan area, being separated from the Kalapuyans, and pushed southwards by intruding Athabaskan speakers. Golla (2011) suggests that Takelma replaced an earlier Karuk-like language in the Rogue Valley, based on aeral features shared by Takelma and Karuk. This event is possibly related to archaeological evidence of a transition in the material cultures of the Rogue Valley that occurred around 300 CE, from the "Glade Tradition" to the "Siskiyou Pattern".

== Proto-language ==
Proto-Takelma–Kalapuyan
- Proto-Takelman
- Reconstruction of: Takelma–Kalapuyan languages

Proto-Takelma–Kalapuyan ("Proto-Takelman") reconstructions by William Shipley (1969):

no.	gloss	Proto-Takelman
1	alder	*po·ph
2	ant	**tipusì·
3	arise	*te·p
4	arrive	*wok
5	aunt, paternal	*thàth
6	bite	*ye·kʷ
7	blood	*yó·m
8	blow	*pho·ł
9	camass	*ti·ph
10	cedar	*l- -m
11	chipmunk	*kʷis
12	climb	**hilu, huwil
13	cold	*thu·ku(n)
14	cry	*tha·k
15	cut	*(s)k- -p
16	daughter	**peyane
17	dirt	*pólo
18	dive	*yalk
19	drink	*ʔu·kʷit
20	dust	*(s)khò·p
21	elk	*thkám
22	father	*ham
23	father	*mà
24	fear	*ni·w
25	finish	*takh
26	flea	*te·wek
27	fly	*thkàn(ak)
28	go for	*wo·(t)
29	grass	**lu·kʷá·y
30	I	**kí·
31	know	**yokʷhoy
32	left	**(s)kày
33	liver	*páL
34	long	**páLs
35	marry	*yo·kʷ
36	mother	*ni
37	name	*kʷet(éy)
38	neck	*pò·kh(t)
39	new	*pa(n)lá(w)
40	otter	**kʷin
41	owl	*thukwal-
42	owl, screech	*(t)popó(ph)
43	panther	*huLikh
44	path	*kʷaL(i), kawL(i)
45	penis	*khál
46	pierce	*t(w)al
47	push	*tuyk
48	rattlesnake	*tk- -m
49	red	*cil
50	river	*kel
51	rock	*tá(n)
52	say	*naka
53	seek	*ʔo·t
54	shout	*la(·)law
55	sit	*yo·
56	sleep	*way(a·)n
57	snail	*thpáLith
58	spider	*to·m
59	squirrel	*poyakh
60	sun	**pyan
61	tears	*yét
62	this	*ha·
63	thou	*ma·
64	three	**xùpsiní
65	tie	*takh(t)
66	two	*ka·m(i)
67	uncle, maternal	*has
68	wildcat	*ya·kʷh(a)
69	yellowjacket	**tyał
