= Central Kalapuya language =

Extinct Native American language formerly spoken in Oregon

Central Kalapuya
- Native to: United States
- Region: Northwest Oregon
- Ethnicity: Kalapuya of Willamette Valley
- Extinct: c. 1954, with the death of John B. Hudson
- Language family: Kalapuyan: Central Kalapuya
- Dialects: Ahantchuyuk; Santiam; Luckiamute; Chepenafa; Chemapho; Chelamela; Tsankupi; Winefelly-Mohawk

Language codes
- ISO 639-3: kyl
- Glottolog: kala1400

Central Kalapuyan was a Kalapuyan language indigenous to the central and southern Willamette Valley in Oregon in the United States. It was spoken by various bands of the Kalapuya peoples who inhabited the valley up through the middle of the 19th century. The language is closely related to Northern Kalapuya, spoken in the Tualatin and Yamhill valleys.

== Dialects ==
Dialects of Central Kalapuya that have been identified include:

- Ahantchuyuk dialect, spoken in the northeastern Willamette Valley along the Pudding and Molalla rivers
- Santiam dialect, spoken in the central Willamette Valley along the lower Santiam River
- Luckiamute dialect, spoken in the central Willamette Valley along the Luckiamute River
- Chepenafa dialect, spoken in the central Willamette Valley along Marys River
- Chemapho dialect, spoken in the central Willamette Valley along Muddy Creek
- Chelamela dialect, spoken in the southwestern Willamette Valley along the Long Tom River
- Tsankupi dialect, spoken in the southeastern Willamette Valley along the Calapooia River
- Winefelly-Mohawk dialects, spoken in the southeastern Willamette Valley along the McKenzie, Mohawk, and Coast Fork Willamette rivers

== Phonology ==
The phonology of the Santiam dialect, as described by Jacobs (1945) and analyzed by Banks (2007), is listed below. Banks notes that Jacobs' analysis does not rigorously account for allophonic variation, and that, according to Jacobs, there may have been some interchangeability between the velar and uvular series.

=== Consonants ===
		Bilabial	Alveolar			Palatal	Velar		Uvular		Glottal	
		Bilabial	plain	sibilant	lateral	Palatal	plain	lab.	plain	lab.	plain	lab.
Plosive/ Affricate	plain	p	t	ts		tʃ	k	kʷ	q	qʷ	ʔ	
Plosive/ Affricate	aspirated	pʰ	tʰ	tsʰ		tʃʰ	kʰ	kʷʰ	qʰ	qʷʰ		
Plosive/ Affricate	ejective	pʼ	tʼ	tsʼ		tʃʼ	kʼ	kʷʼ	qʼ	qʷʼ		
Nasal		m	n				ŋ					
Fricative		ɸ		s	ɬ	ʃ	x		χ		h	hʷ
Approximant					l	j		w				

The nasals [m] and [n] likely had syllabic forms: [m̩] and [n̩]. Jacobs possibly notes that the plosives also have voiced allophones, as [b], [d], [ɡ], [ɡʷ], [ɢ], and [ɢʷ]. Banks also notes that /h/, /hʷ/, /dz/, /dʒ/, and /ɸʷ/ may have been allophones.

=== Vowels ===
	Front	Central	Back
Close	i		u
Open-mid	æ ~ ɛ		ɔ
Open		a	

Santiam Kalapuya had three diphthongs: [ai], [au], and [ui]. Vowel length may have been phonemic, /ɔ/ may have been an allophone of /u/.
