= Anson Dart =

American government official (1797–1879)

Anson Dart (1797–1879) was the Superintendent for Indian Affairs in the Oregon Territory from 1850 to 1852. Dart negotiated treaties with the tribes in the territory (now the states of Oregon and Washington), thirteen of which were negotiated August 5–9, 1851, at Tansy Point located in Warrenton, Oregon. Dart's orders were to remove the western Oregon tribes to the east of the Cascade Range. This plan did not succeed as tribes refused to sign these treaties. Dart finally settled on tribal reservations west of the Cascades. Altogether Dart negotiated 19 treaties in the territory. These treaties were never ratified by the United States Congress. Dart resigned in 1852 to be replaced by Joel Palmer who was very successful with his treaties negotiated in 1853-1855.
