= Mohawk High School (Marcola, Oregon) =

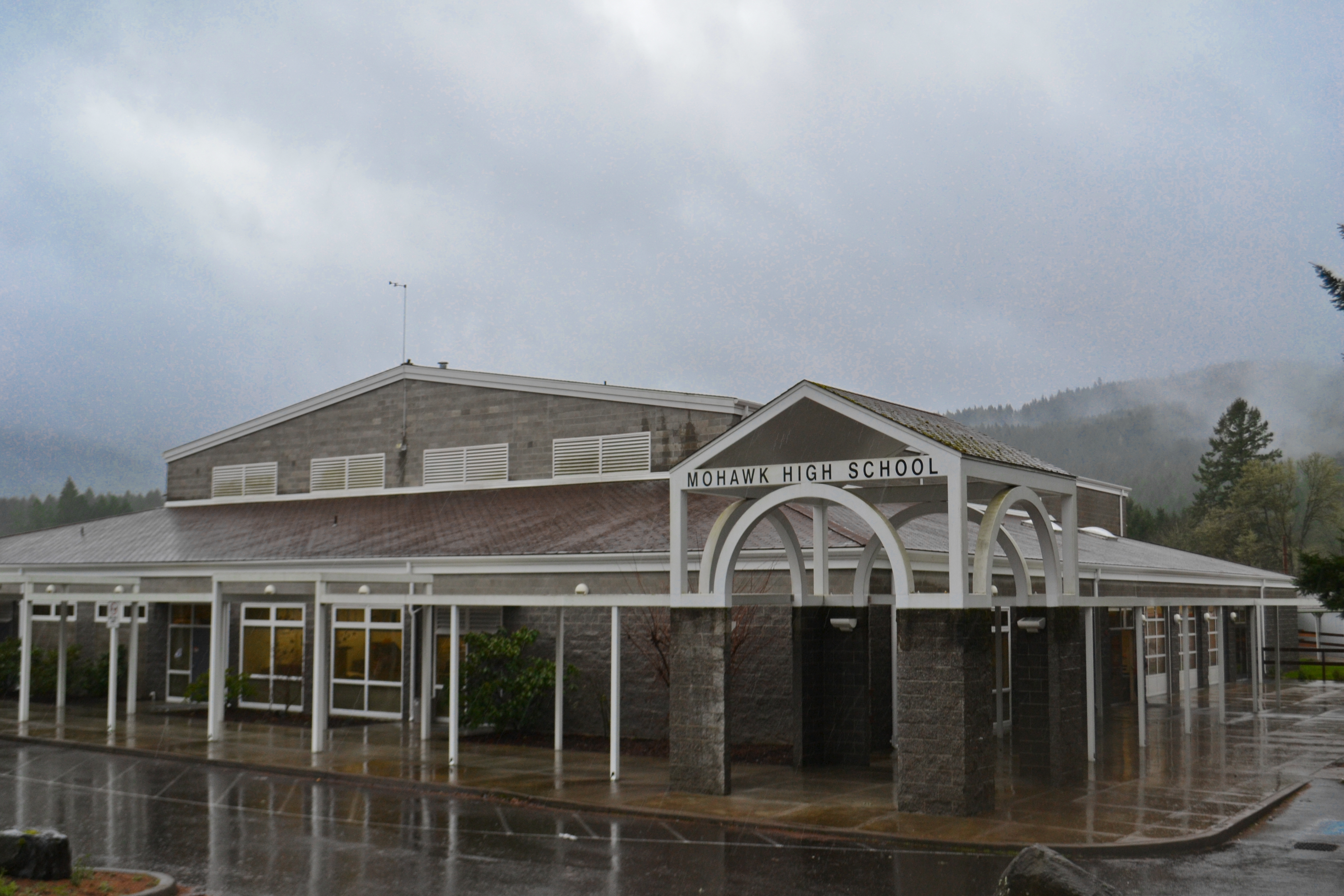

Location
- 38300 Wendling Road; Marcola, Lane County, Oregon 97454; United States; 44.170987°N 122.85323°W

Information
- Type: Public
- School district: Marcola School District
- Principal: Bill Watkins
- Teaching staff: 10.50 (FTE)
- Grades: 7-12
- Enrollment: 133 (2024–2025)
- Student to teacher ratio: 12.67
- Colors: Orange and black
- Athletics conference: OSAA Mountain West League 1A-3
- Mascot: Mustangs
- Team name: Mohawk Mustangs
- Website: www.marcola.k12.or.us/page/mohawk-high-school/

Mohawk High School is a public high school in Marcola, Oregon, United States.

== Academics ==
In 2008, 81% of the school's seniors received their high school diploma. Of 31 students, 25 graduated, 3 dropped out, 2 received a modified diploma, and 1 is still in high school.

In 2015 Mohawk made the first softball team in 12 years and they also made the first Mohawk Valley LEO Club.

In the 2024-25 school year, the STEM Club was reestablished as part of a senior project to build a student lead team to compete in the Solar Car Challenge. The team is known as Solar Equestrians and their first car is named Sun Biscuit. Current goals are to compete in the 2027 Solar Car Challenge.
