= Northern Kalapuya language =

Extinct Native American language formerly spoken in Oregon

Tualatin-Yamhill
- Northern Kalapuya
- Native to: United States
- Region: Northwest Oregon
- Extinct: 1937, with the death of Louis Kenoyer
- Language family: Kalapuyan: Tualatin-Yamhill
- Dialects: Tualatin; Yamhill

Language codes
- ISO 639-3: nrt
- Glottolog: tual1242

Northern Kalapuyan is an extinct Kalapuyan language indigenous to northwestern Oregon in the United States. It was spoken by Kalapuya groups in the northern Willamette Valley southwest of present-day Portland.

Two distinct dialects of the language have been identified. The Tualatin dialect (Tfalati, Atfalati) was spoken along the Tualatin River. The Yamhill (Yamhala) dialect was spoken along the Yamhill River. The language is closely related to Central Kalapuya, spoken by related groups in the central and southern Willamette Valley.

The terminal speaker of Northern Kalapuya was Louis Kenoyer who died in 1937.
