= Oregon Superintendent of Indian Affairs =

The Oregon Superintendent of Indian Affairs was an official position of the U.S. state of Oregon, and previously of the Oregon Territory, that existed from 1848 to 1873.

== Background ==
The Bureau of Indian Affairs (BIA) was created in 1824 to regulate contacts between Native Americans and settlers.

Territorial governors often served as ex officio superintendents of Indian affairs, and had a general responsibility for Indian affairs in a territory or other political region. In this capacity, they would help negotiate treaties and clear titles to land. A system of agencies was established under each superintendent where each agency was responsible for one or more tribes.

Indian agents were appointed by the President with approval of the Senate. Most agents reported to superintendents, while other reported directly to the central office in Washington, D.C., and relied on local military posts for law enforcement as it related to Indians.

=== Oregon Superintendency ===
In 1842, an Indian subagency for the "country West of the Rocky mountains" was established and located in Oregon City in the Willamette Valley. The Oregon Superintendency was established in 1848, when the Oregon Territory was organized. This was about the same time that the Donation Land Claim Act opened Oregon to settlement. The superintendency had jurisdiction over the entire area west of the Rocky Mountains and north of the 42nd parallel. The territorial governor, Joseph Lane, acted as the ex officio superintendent until 1850, when a separate official was appointed.

In 1851, the superintendency headquarters was moved from Oregon City to Milwaukie. Later moves included: 1853 to Dayton; 1856 back to Oregon City; 1857 to Salem; 1859 to Portland; and in 1861 back to Salem. When Washington Territory was established in 1853, a separate superintendency was established there with jurisdiction over the area north of the Columbia River and the 46th parallel.

=== Agents ===
Elijah White was appointed Indian sub agent, the first, in 1842. He had most of the duties of an Indian superintendent but since the Oregon Treaty (1846) had not yet taken place, the US did not have the authority to appoint a superintendent. White oversaw numerous complaints by the tribes, the Cockstock Affair in Oregon city (1843), and complaints by the Umatilla and Walla Walla peoples that they had been treated poorly in California in 1847.

The first three regular agents were appointed to the Oregon Superintendency in 1850. There were previous agents, Joseph Lane and Josiah Parrish but the Indian agent roles were reduced until treaty making, and establishing the peace was necessary. They were assigned to geographical areas rather than to particular tribes. The Indian agencies in Oregon Territory were Coast (Siletz), Alsea, Grand Ronde, Warm Springs, Umatilla, Klamath, Nez Perce and Malheur. The agencies changed over time based on wars and the progress of treaty land cessions. The Oregon Territory also had numerous Indian management Districts: Puget Sound District, Southeastern District, Port Orford, Eastern (east of Cascades), Western (west of Cascades), Northern (north of the Columbia until the Washington Territory was sectioned off) Umpqua, Astoria (north Oregon coast and lower Columbia), Willamette Valley, Umpqua Valley, Klamath, and Rogue River. The Indian District configurations changed over time as tribes were moved to reservations, as the territory was divided between Oregon and Washington territories, and as wars and conflicts occurred. The agency structure in Oregon was complicated because of the removal of Indians from their original homes and the attempt to concentrate them on reservations. There were also many encampments, subagencies, special agencies, and local agencies, especially after the wars of 1855. The Northern district changed responsibility from the Oregon Superintendency to the Washington Superintendency several times in the mid-1850s.

=== Bands ===
A partial list of the tribes that were assigned to the Oregon Superintendency were the Cayuse, Chastacosta, Chetco, Clackamas, Joshua, Kalapuya, Klamath, Modoc, Molala, Nez Perce, Paiute, Rogue River, Shasta, Sixes (Kwatami), "Snake", Tenino, Umatilla, Umpqua, Wallawalla, Warm Springs, Wasco, and Yamel.There were upwards of a hundred tribes and bands in the Oregon Territory.

=== Dissolution ===
From 1857 to 1861, the Oregon and Washington superintendencies were combined. The Oregon Superintendency was abolished in 1873—the agents in Oregon then reported directly to the BIA in Washington, D.C.

== List of superintendents ==
- Joseph Lane (1848–1850) (was Oregon Governor at the same time)
- Anson Dart (June 21, 1850 – 1852)
- Joel Palmer (March 17, 1853 – August 16, 1856) (resigned)
- Absalom F. Hedges (June 21, 1856 – May 1, 1857)
- James W. Nesmith (March 12, 1857 – 1859)
- Edward R. Geary (March 22, 1859-?)
- William H. Rector (June 13, 1861-?)
- J. W. Perit Huntington (January 19, 1863-?)
- Alfred B. Meacham (March 29, 1869–?)
- T. B. Odeneal (January 8, 1872–?)

== Agents ==
An incomplete list of Indian agents in Oregon includes:

- George Ambrose
- Lindsay Applegate (Modoc)
- William Bagley (Siletz 1875-)
- Oliver Cromwell Applegate
- B. R. Biddle
- Samuel H. Culver
- Timothy Woodbridge Davenport
- Joseph Emery (Klamath)
- J.H. Fairchild (Siletz 1873-1975)
- John P. Gaines
- Anson G. Henry
- William Logan (1861–1865), U.S. representative (with J. W. Perit Huntington) for 1864 treaty establishing the Warm Springs Indian Reservation with the Klamath, Modoc, and Yahooskin
- Lee Moorhouse (Umatilla)
- Robert Newell (tribes south of the Columbia River)
- Linus M. Nickerson (Klamath Agency, 1878-)
- Joel Palmer (Siletz- ~1868-1872)
- Josiah Lamberson Parrish
- Samuel Parrish
- William V. Rinehart
- J. H. Roark (Klamath Agency 1877–78)
- Patrick B. Sinnott
- Alonzo A. Skinner
- S. M. Smith
- Elijah Steele
- Elijah White (Nez Perce, Walla Walla and Cayuse)

== See also ==
- Isaac Stevens
- List of Indian reservations in Oregon
- Rogue River Wars
