= Marcola, Oregon =

Community in the state of Oregon, United States

- Census-designated place
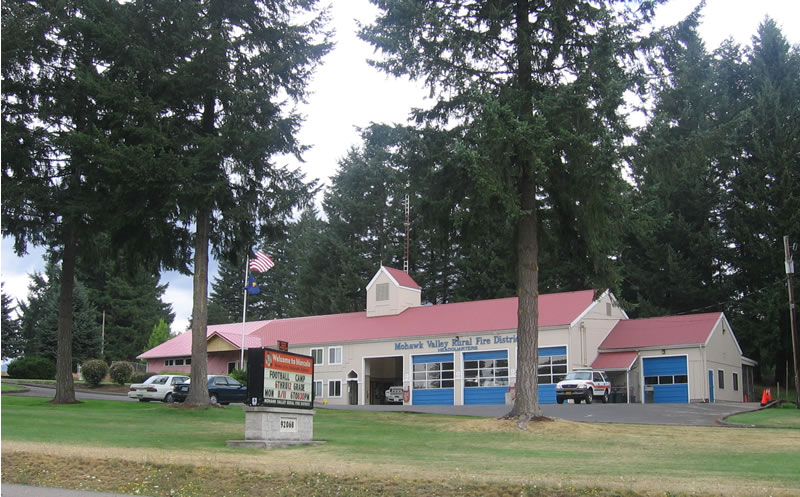
- Mohawk Valley Fire Station in Marcola

- Location within Oregon Location within the United States
- Coordinates: 44°10′21″N 122°51′58″W
- Country: United States
- State: Oregon
- County: Lane

Area
  - Total: 1.22 sq mi (3.15 km^{2})
  - Land: 1.22 sq mi (3.15 km^{2})
  - Water: 0 sq mi (0.00 km^{2})
- Elevation: 538 ft (164 m)

Population (2020)
  - Total: 580
  - Density: 477.3/sq mi (184.29/km^{2})
- Time zone: UTC-8 (Pacific (PST))
  - Summer (DST): UTC-7 (PDT)
- ZIP code: 97454
- Area codes: 541 and 458
- FIPS code: 41-45850
- GNIS feature ID: 2812885

Marcola is an unincorporated community and census-designated place (CDP) in Lane County, Oregon, United States. The community is located on the Mohawk River northeast of Springfield.

As of the 2020 census, Marcola had a population of 580.

== History ==
The post office at this location was established in 1876 and originally called "Isabel" for early settler Isabel Applegate. In 1899-1900, a railroad was built through the Mohawk Valley and a station named Marcola was established near the post office. Marcola was a name made up to honor Mary Cole, the wife of the town's founder, Columbus Cole. In 1901, the post office name was changed to agree with the name of the station.

The 1938 National Register of Historic Places-listed Earnest Bridge, a covered bridge in the Marcola area, was featured in the 1965 James Stewart film Shenandoah.

== Education ==
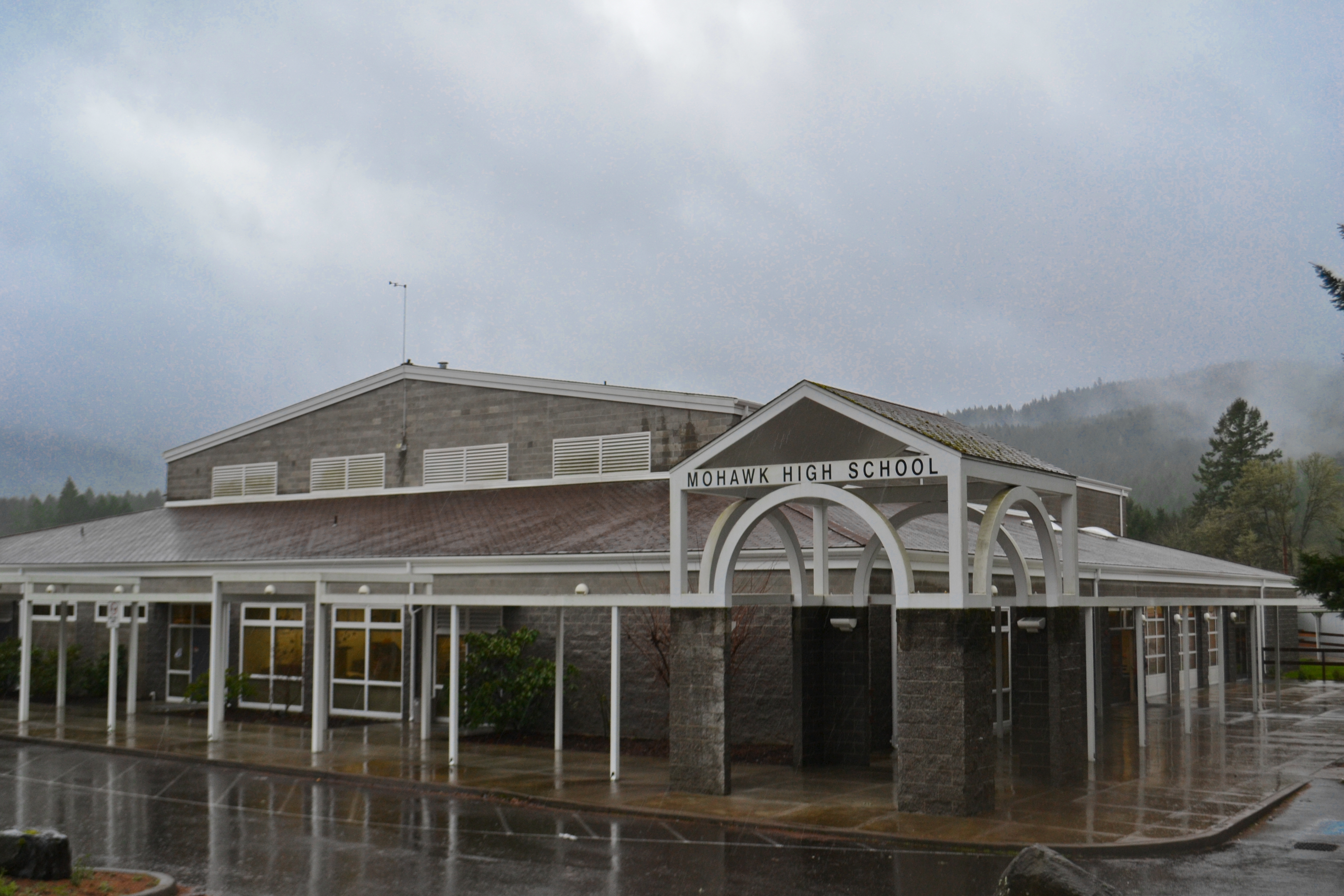
Mohawk High School

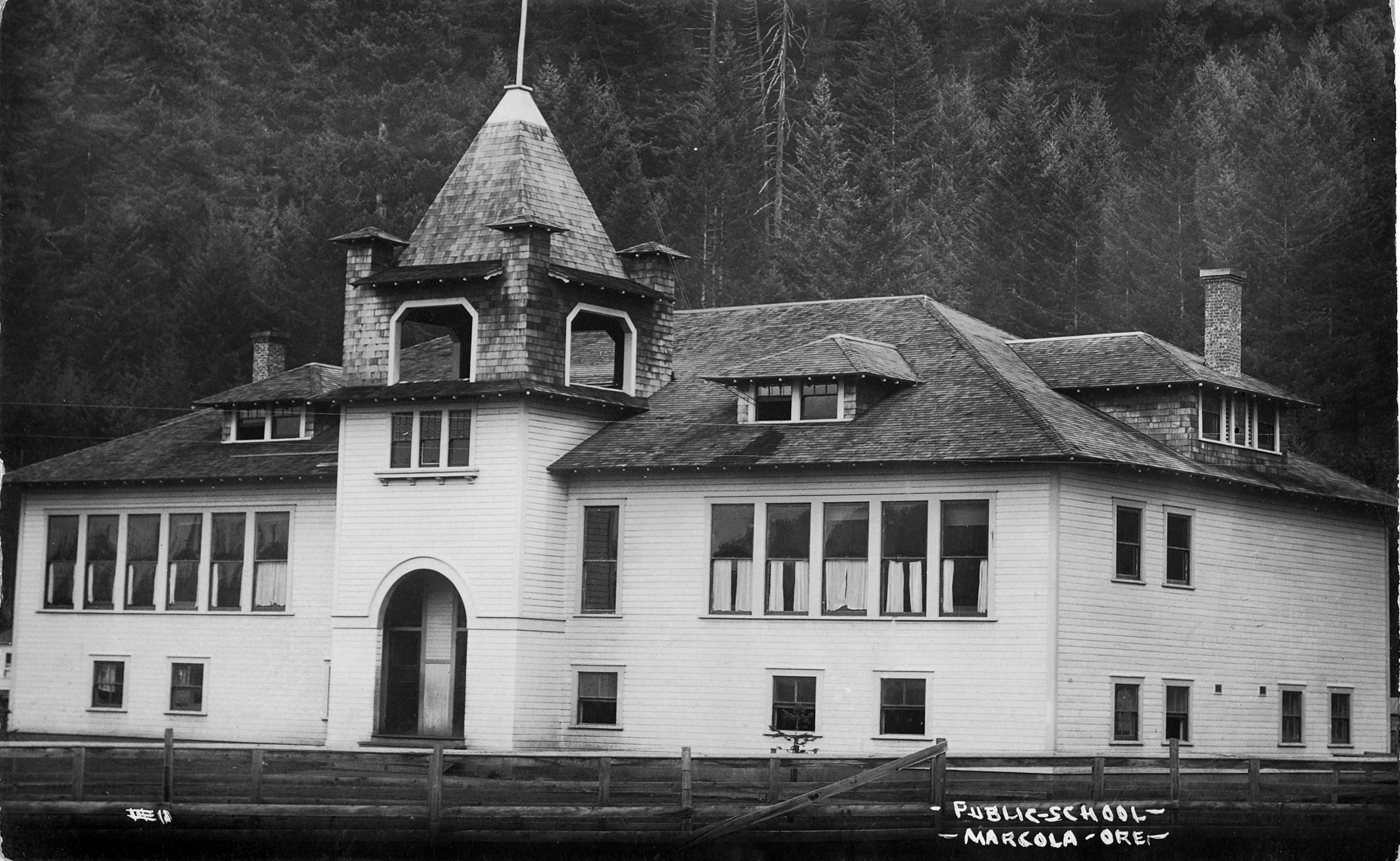
Former wooden public school

Most of Marcola CDP is in the Marcola School District, which operates Mohawk High School.

Portions are in the Springfield School District 19.

Lane County is in the Lane Community College district.

== Demographics ==
Historical population
Census	Pop.	Note	%±
2020	580		—
U.S. Decennial Census

== Notable people ==
- Courtney Love (born 1964), musician and actress, lived with her family at a commune in Marcola
