= Joel Palmer =

American pioneer, author, politician (1810–1881)

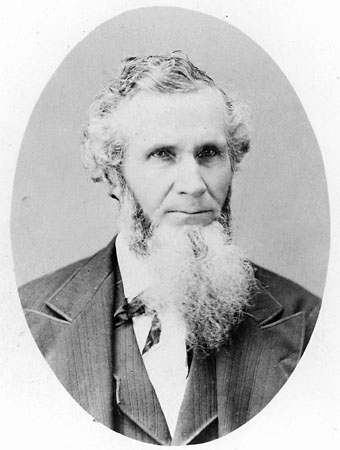

3rd Speaker of the Oregon House of Representatives
- In office 1862–1863
- Preceded by: Benjamin F. Harding
- Succeeded by: Isaac R. Moores Jr.

Personal details
- Born: October 4, 1810 Elizabethtown, Upper Canada
- Died: June 9, 1881 (aged 70) Dayton, Oregon, U.S.
- Party: Democrat, later Republican
- Spouse(s): Catherine Coffee m. 1830; Sarah Ann Derbyshire m. 1836
- Profession: soldier, pioneer, businessman

General Joel Palmer (October 4, 1810 – June 9, 1881) was an American pioneer of the Oregon Territory in the Pacific Northwest region of North America. He was born in Upper Canada, and spent his early years in New York and Pennsylvania before serving as a member of the Indiana House of Representatives.

Palmer traveled to the Oregon Country in 1845. He played a central role in blazing the last leg of the Oregon Trail, the Barlow Road, with Sam Barlow and others. Specifically, Palmer is noted for having climbed high on Mount Hood to observe the surrounding area when the party ran into difficulty. He wrote a popular immigrant guidebook, co-founded Dayton, Oregon, and served as a controversial Indian Affairs administrator. After Oregon became a state, Palmer served in both branches of the Oregon Legislative Assembly. He was selected as Speaker of the Oregon House of Representatives for one session in 1862, and in 1870 lost a bid to become Governor of Oregon.

The Palmer House, his former home in Dayton, was added to the National Register of Historic Places in 1987.

== Early life ==
Joel Palmer was born in Elizabethtown, Ontario, Canada, on October 4, 1810. His parents, Hannah Phelps and Ephraim Palmer, were American Quakers. When he was two years old, they moved to New York's Catskill Mountains in response to the War of 1812. He received only three months of formal education in elementary school. In 1822, when Palmer was 12, his parents indentured him to the Haworth family for a period of four years. When he gained his freedom, he moved to Bucks County, Pennsylvania, to work on canals and bridges.

He was married to Catherine Coffee from 1830 until her death after childbirth. On October 8, 1832, Palmer became a United States citizen. Palmer married his second wife, Sarah Ann Derbyshire, in 1836, and bought land near Laurel, Indiana, in the Whitewater Valley, where he supervised a construction project for a canal. In 1843, he was elected as a Democrat to the Indiana House of Representatives for a one-year term. Representing Franklin County, he was re-elected to the legislature in 1844.

== Oregon pioneer ==
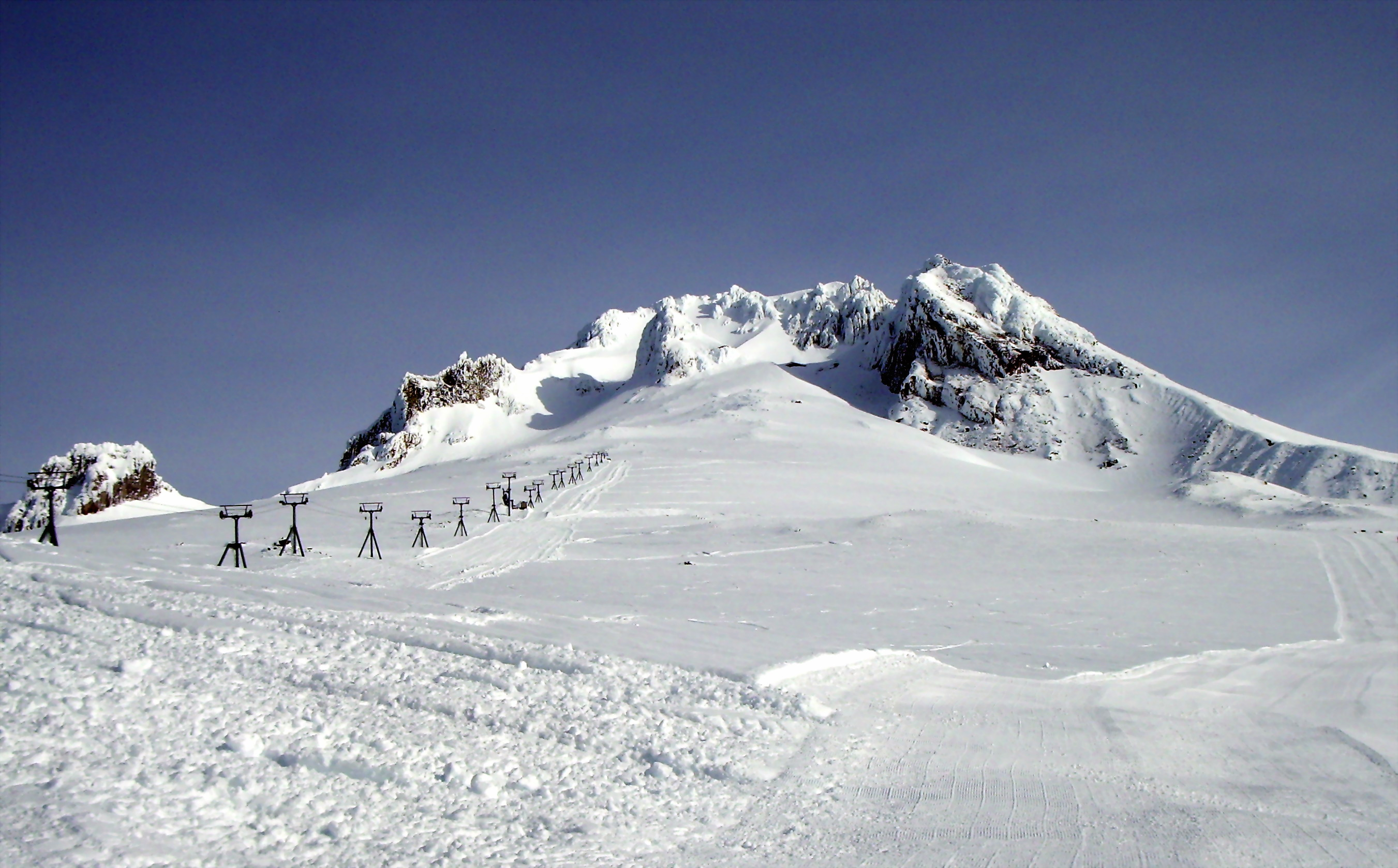
Palmer Glacier and the Palmer chairlift on Mount Hood

In the spring of 1845, Palmer traveled to Oregon without his family, as captain of a wagon train of 23 wagons. Stephen Meek served as the train's paid guide. Meek left the group at Fort Hall to lead some of the members on the Meek Cutoff. The remaining parts of the wagon train reached the end of the overland Oregon Trail at the Columbia River, and unwilling to wait for transport down the dangerous Cascade Rapids, Palmer's party joined Sam Barlow's party in a quest for passage through the Cascade Range around the south side of Mount Hood. Palmer climbed to the 9,000-foot level of Mount Hood on October 7, 1845—with little food and the scant protection of moccasins—to scout a route off the mountains. This was Mount Hood's first recorded climb; the Palmer Glacier on the mountain is named for him.

Because of the onset of winter, the Barlow, Rector, and Palmer parties were forced to leave their wagons on the mountain's eastern foothills. Palmer left on horseback for Oregon City, while Barlow and Rector blazed a trail to Oregon City on foot. Sam Barlow later returned with partner Philip Foster to establish the Mount Hood Toll Road, which became known as the Barlow Road.

In 1846, Palmer returned to his family in Indiana and in 1847 he published his diary as Palmer's Journal of Travels Over the Rocky Mountains, 1845–1846. This book provided equipment guidance and comprehensive route information for those crossing the Oregon Trail. The publication also had a general description of the Oregon Country, a detailed description of the Willamette Valley, and included a copy of the Organic Laws of Oregon adopted by settlers at the Champoeg Meetings. It was a popular guidebook for immigrants for the next ten years.

Also in 1847, Palmer traveled with his family to Oregon as captain of that year's major wagon train. While passing through the Walla Walla Valley he met Marcus and Narcissa Whitman at their mission shortly before their deaths in the Whitman massacre—the event that precipitated the Cayuse War. Perhaps motivated by meeting the Whitmans, Palmer later returned to serve as a peace commissioner to tribes considering joining the Cayuse. At the outset of the war he was appointed as commissary-general of the Provisional Government's militia forces.

After the war, in 1848, Palmer joined the California Gold Rush but returned in 1849 to co-found Dayton, Oregon on the lower Yamhill River where he built a sawmill on his donation land claim.

== Oregon politician ==
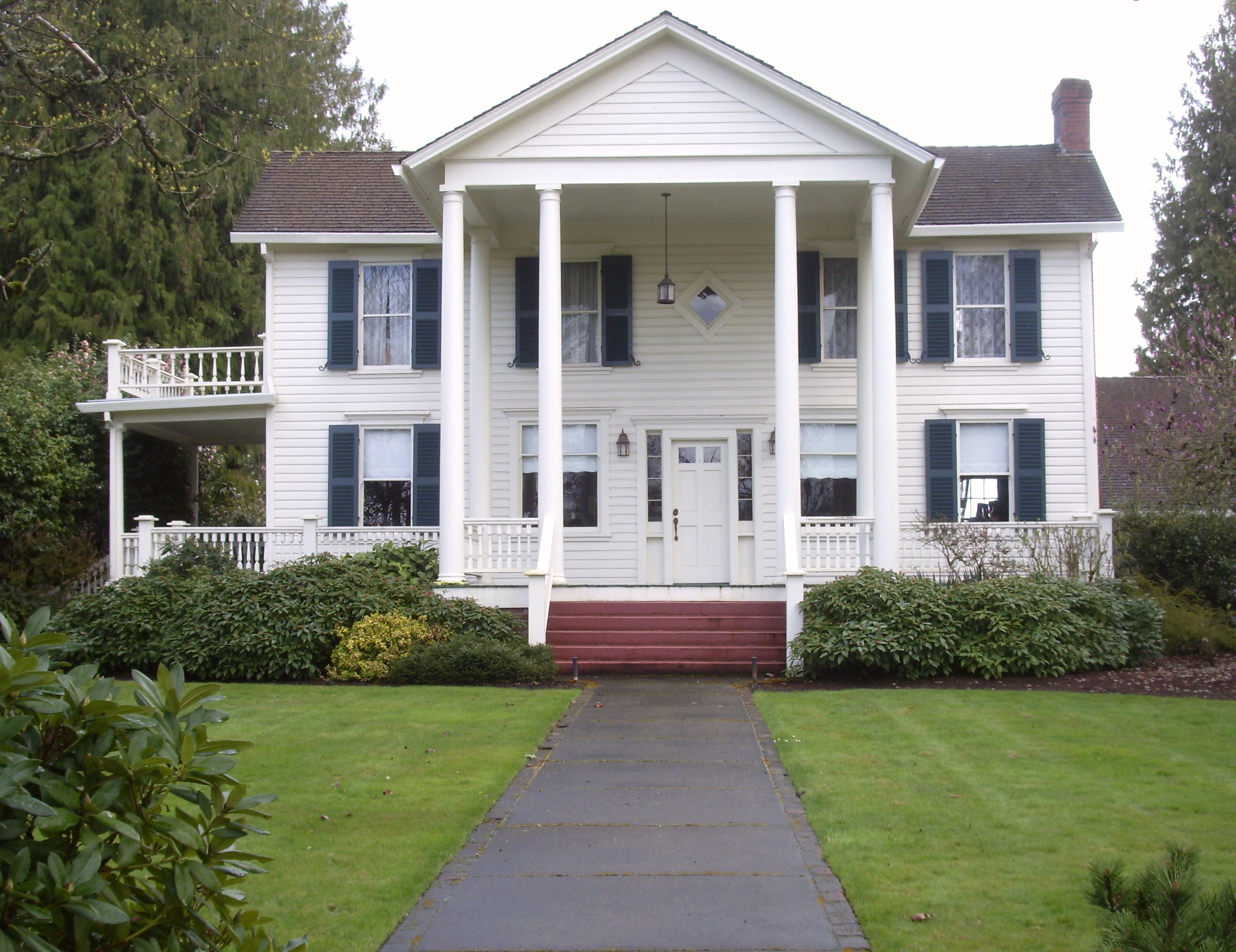
Palmer House is Dayton's oldest standing structure

In 1853, President Franklin Pierce appointed Palmer Superintendent of Indian Affairs for the Oregon Territory. The debate of what to do with Native Americans ranged from full integration to total extermination. Palmer proved effective negotiating "Cessation of Hostility treaties" with the native tribes in 1854 and 1855, brokering nine of fifteen treaties. He joined Isaac Stevens, his counterpart for the Washington Territory, in the successful Walla Walla Treaty Council of the Yakima Indian War. Approximately 5,000 Indians attended deliberations from May 29, 1855, to June 11, 1855.

Palmer gained an anti-settler reputation among immigrants, newspapers and officials, who said he acted too favorably toward the Indians, even though he moved the tribes to reservations outside the Willamette Valley, seeking to avoid friction between settlers and natives by physical distance. In late 1855, while moving the Rogue River tribes to the Grand Ronde Reservation, violent resistance was threatened by settlers who felt the land should not be given to the tribes. Palmer succeeded, but the territorial legislature petitioned for his removal from office, which became effective in 1857.

After leaving office as Indian Affairs Superintendent, Palmer worked his farm on his land claim and operated his sawmill and several other enterprises. Between 1858 and 1861 he spent time in British Columbia as a merchant to prospectors in the gold rushes of the Thompson River, Similkameen Valley, and Fraser River. Palmer blazed a route to the gold fields of the Okanogan Valley and the upper portions of the Columbia River from Priest Rapids in 1860. In 1862, he was elected to the Oregon House of Representatives to represent Yamhill County. Now a member of the Republican Party, he was named Speaker of the House during that session.

That year Palmer also established the Columbia River Road Company to build a trail through the Columbia River Gorge on the Oregon side of the river. In 1864, Palmer was elected to the State Senate and served in that chamber through 1866. This included the 1865 special session of the legislature when Oregon adopted the Thirteenth Amendment to the United States Constitution that abolished slavery throughout the United States. He ran for governor in the 1870 election as the Republican candidate, but was narrowly defeated by La Fayette Grover, largely for his Indian policies.

=== Treaties negotiated by Palmer ===
- Treaty with the Rogue River, 1853
- Treaty with the Umpqua–Cow Creek Band, 1853
- Treaty with the Rogue River, 1854
- Treaty with the Chasta, etc., 1854
- Treaty with the Umpqua and Kalapuya, 1854
- Treaty with the Kalapuya, etc., 1855
- Treaty with the Wallawalla, Cayuse, etc., 1855
- Treaty with the Middle Tribes of Oregon, 1855
- Treaty with the Molala, 1855

== Later years and legacy ==
Palmer's brother, named Ephraim like their father, also immigrated to Oregon and served as a captain in the first regiment of the Oregon Infantry. In 1871, Palmer was the state's Indian agent to the Siletz tribe, remaining in the office until 1873. All eight of Palmer's children completed higher education. Joel Palmer died in Dayton on June 9, 1881, at the age of 70. His former home that he built in 1852, Palmer House, was added to the National Register of Historic Places in 1987, and is now operating as a restaurant. Palmer's name is one of 158 memorialized in the frieze of the two chambers of the Oregon Legislative Assembly at the Oregon State Capitol, with his located in the Senate chamber. During World War II the liberty ship SS Joel Palmer, hull number 2025, was built and named in his honor. The Oregon Historical Society issues the Joel Palmer Award for the year's best article in its quarterly publication, Oregon Historical Quarterly.

Party political offices
Preceded by George Lemuel Woods	Republican nominee for Governor of Oregon; 1870	Succeeded by J. C. Tolman
