= Chrystos =

American writer, activist

- Born: Christina Smith; November 7, 1946 (age 79); San Francisco, California, US
- Occupations: Writer; artist; activist

Chrystos (/ˈkrɪstoʊs/; born November 7, 1946, as Christina Smith) is a two-spirit writer and activist whose work explores Native American civil rights, social justice, and feminism. They are of mixed Menominee–Lithuanian/Alsace–Lorraine heritage. Chrystos is also a lecturer, writing teacher, and artist.

== Life ==
Chrystos was born off-reservation in San Francisco, California, was taught to read by their self-educated father, and began writing poetry at age nine. Chrystos had a difficult childhood, including being sexually abused by a relative. They lived with their abusive mother, Virginia (née Lunkes), who was of Lithuanian and Alsatian descent, and their father of Menominee heritage, Fletcher L. Smith, who was a World War II veteran. At the age of seventeen, Chrystos was placed into a psychiatric hospital. They fell into drug addiction, alcoholism, and prostitution during this time. They were re-institutionalized several more times before deciding it was ineffective in helping their mental health issues.

Chrystos is a lesbian and two-spirit. They moved to Bainbridge Island, Washington in 1980. They have been a resident of Ocean Shores, Washington since 2011.

== Career ==
A self-described political poet, Chrystos was inspired by familial issues stemming from European American cultural hegemony, and more positively influenced by the works of Audre Lorde, Joy Harjo, Elizabeth Woody, and Lillian Pitt, among others. They produced a series of volumes of poetry and prose throughout the 1980s and 1990s. Chrystos' work focuses on social justice issues, such as how colonialism and racism affect the lives of women, lesbians, and Indigenous people. Their works are primarily intended for an audience of Indigenous people, other people of color, and lesbians. Their works are also intended to help Native Americans connect with their heritage and to break down stereotypes. Scholar Sandra M. Cox describes Chrystos' work as a form of autoethnography. Chrystos self-illustrated many of their books covers, and often had their books published in Canada to work around censorious American publishers and lack of support for writers in the United States.

While they're better known for their poems about social justice, Chrystos also has a significant body of erotic poetry. It is more celebratory and its presentation more formal than their other work. Chrystos co-edited Best Lesbian Erotica 1999 with Tristan Taormino.

Chrystos' awards include a National Endowment for the Arts grant, the Sappho Award of Distinction from the Astraea Lesbian Foundation for Justice, a Barbara Deming Memorial Fund grant, and the Audre Lorde International Poetry Competition. Scholars have suggested that Chrystos uses Indigenous expressions of eroticism as an antidote to the repressive effects of colonialism upon Indigenous genders and sexuality.

== Activism ==
Chrystos was part of efforts to free Norma Jean Croy and Leonard Peltier, and their activism often focuses on the rights of Native American peoples including the Navajo and Mohawk people. In a 2010 interview, Chrystos described their social justice interests as "diverse," citing abortion rights, domestic violence, and prisoners' rights.

== Works ==
- This Bridge Called My Back, Kitchen Table, 1981; contributor
- Not Vanishing, Vancouver: Press Gang Publishers, 1988, ISBN 0-88974-015-1
- Dream On, Vancouver: Press Gang Publishers, 1991
- In Her I Am, Vancouver: Press Gang Publishers, 1993
- Fugitive Colors, Cleveland State University Poetry Center, 1995, ISBN 1-880834-11-1
- Fire Power, Vancouver: Press Gang Publishers, 1995, ISBN 0-88974-047-X
- Some Poems by People I Like (Sandra Alland, editor), Toronto: SandrasLittleBookshop, 2007, ISBN 978-0-9739540-1-2; contributor
- Best Lesbian Erotica 1999, Cleis Press, 1999, ISBN 1573440493; co-editor

== See also ==
- Native American studies
- Lesbian poetry
