= Lillian Pitt =

- Born: 1943 (age 82–83); Warm Springs Reservation, Oregon
- Citizenship: Confederated Tribes of the Warm Springs Reservation of Oregon and American
- Education: Mt. Hood Community College
- Known for: Mask-making, ceramics, and mixed media
- Website: lillianpitt.com

Lillian Pitt (born 1943) is a Native American artist from the Columbia River Plateau region of the Pacific Northwest. Her Native American name is Wak'amu (camas root), chosen because it represents a "stubborn plant that won't let go of the earth", referring to the long periods of time she spent wandering the hills during her childhood. Pitt is primarily known for her sculpting and mixed media artistry, which focuses on 12,000 years of Native American history and tradition of the Columbia River region.

== Early life and education ==
Pitt, who is Wasco and Yakama, was born and grew up on the Warm Springs Reservation in 1944. Later, after graduating from Madras High School, she moved to Portland, Oregon, in the early 1960s. Due to a back issue, she decided to take art classes at Mount Hood Community College and practice designing ceramic masks in 1981. Some of her early influences included the sculptor and painter R.C. Gorman (Navajo Nation) and Japanese mask-making and ceramic practices such as Raku and Anagama.

== Career ==
=== Columbia River iconography ===
Lillian Pitt is also known for her iconography, in which she works to identify ancestral Columbia River petroglyphs in order to affirm the Indigenous presence in the region. Pitt is skilled in reanimating ancient images illustrated on rocks. And in the 1990s, she experimented with several mediums, including precious metals to create jewelry, bronze masks, and sculptures. She has also collaborated with the Pendleton Woolen Mills to create blankets representing the Columbia River legends and petroglyphs.

In 2000, the Army Corps of Engineers commissioned her to create bronze plaques on petroglyph imagery for Columbia River tribal fishing sites, which were flooded by a dam. During the same year, she was awarded a fellowship from Portland's Interstate Firehouse Cultural Center to create large-scale bronze sculptures. She had also started several public arts projects in the early 2000s, in collaboration with artists such as Rick Bartow (Wiyot), Gail Tremblay (Onondaga/Mi'kmaq), and Elizabeth Woody (Navajo/Warm Springs/Wasco/Yakama), who is also her niece.

Pitt is a significant partner of the Confluence Project, a collaborative effort of Pacific Northwest tribes that stretches 450 miles from near the mouth of the Columbia River to the confluence of the Clearwater and Snake River in Idaho. Renowned artist Maya Lin, civic groups from Washington and Oregon, and other artists, architects, and landscape designers have also participated. Pitt designed a Welcome Gate for the river side of the Land bridge that reachers oars inset with glass masks honoring Chinook women.

== Exhibitions ==
- 1997 In Search of Self, Ft. Lewis College Art Gallery, Durango, Colorado
- 1996 Native American Tradition/Contemporary Responses, Society for Contemporary Crafts, Pittsburgh, Pennsylvania; Forest Spirits, Quintana Gallery, Portland, Oregon; Detroit Gallery, Detroit, Michigan
- 1995 Plateau-Spirits, Quintana Gallery, Portland, Oregon; Memorial Union Gallery, University of California, Davis
- 1994 Plateau-Spirits: Works by Lillian Pitt, Institute of American Indian Studies, Washington, Connecticut; Honoring Our Ancestors, Quintana Gallery, Portland, Oregon
- 1993 Governor's Office, Salem, Oregon
- 1992 Out of the Earth, Salishan Lodge, Gleneden Beach, Oregon
- 1991 Spirit Square Art Center, Charlotte, North Carolina; Galleria Posada, Sacramento, California
