= Pat Courtney Gold =

Wasco basket weaver (1939–2022)

- Born: January 22, 1939; Warm Springs Reservation, Oregon, U.S.
- Died: July 11, 2022 (aged 83)
- Education: Whitman College
- Known for: Basket weaving
- Awards: National Heritage Fellowship; 2007

Pat Courtney Gold (January 22, 1939 – July 11, 2022) was a Wasco Native fiber artist and basket weaver from the Columbia River area of Oregon. Gold harvested traditional plant fibers to use in her work, including dogbane, cattail, sedge grass, red cedar bark and tree roots. Her pieces often reflected the natural world along the Columbia River, mixing traditional motifs such as condors and sturgeon with contemporary elements like airplanes. Gold also became an environmental and cultural educator, helping to spread knowledge of her ancestral heritage and basketry skills.

== Career ==
Gold's art is exhibited in museums around the world, including the High Desert Museum, Royal British Columbia Museum, Peabody Museum of Archaeology and Ethnology at Harvard University and Smithsonian National Museum of the American Indian.

In 1991, through the Oregon Traditional Arts Apprenticeship Program, Gold began to study the making of "sally bags," flexible cylindrical baskets created by Wasco-Wishram people for gathering roots and medicines, as well as nuts, seeds and mushrooms. Gold diagrammed historical basket designs and learned about the stories they told, encompassing the symbolism of fishing nets, petroglyphs and other ancestral scenes. She learned the full turn twining technique used to weave the bags and became one of the foremost experts and teachers keeping this style alive. Gold was a co-founder in 1995 of the Northwest Native American Basketweavers Association.

== Personal life ==
Pat Courtney was born and raised on the Warm Springs Reservation in central Oregon. Her mother was an accomplished beadworker, and they would visit local art museums where their ancestors' baskets were on display. She graduated from Madras High School in 1957.

She enrolled at Whitman College, graduating in 1961 with a B.A. in mathematics and physics. She married a Portland State University mathematics professor, Phillip Gold. The couple lived in Scappoose, Oregon. Gold worked as a mathematician-computer specialist for nearly 17 years before beginning her career in basket weaving.

== Awards and honors ==
Gold received an Oregon Governor's Arts Award in 2001. She earned a Community Spirit Award in 2003 and Cultural Capital Fellowship in 2004 from the First People's Fund.

Gold was a recipient of a 2007 National Heritage Fellowship awarded by the National Endowment for the Arts, which is the United States government's highest honor in the folk and traditional arts. She was featured in a 2007 episode of the PBS series Craft in America.

== Published works ==
- Gold, Pat Courtney (Winter 2007). "The Long Narrows: The Forgotten Geographic and Cultural Wonder". Oregon Historical Quarterly. 108 (4): 596–605. doi:10.1353/ohq.2007.0041. JSTOR 20615799.
