= Jacoby Ellsbury =

American baseball player (born 1983)

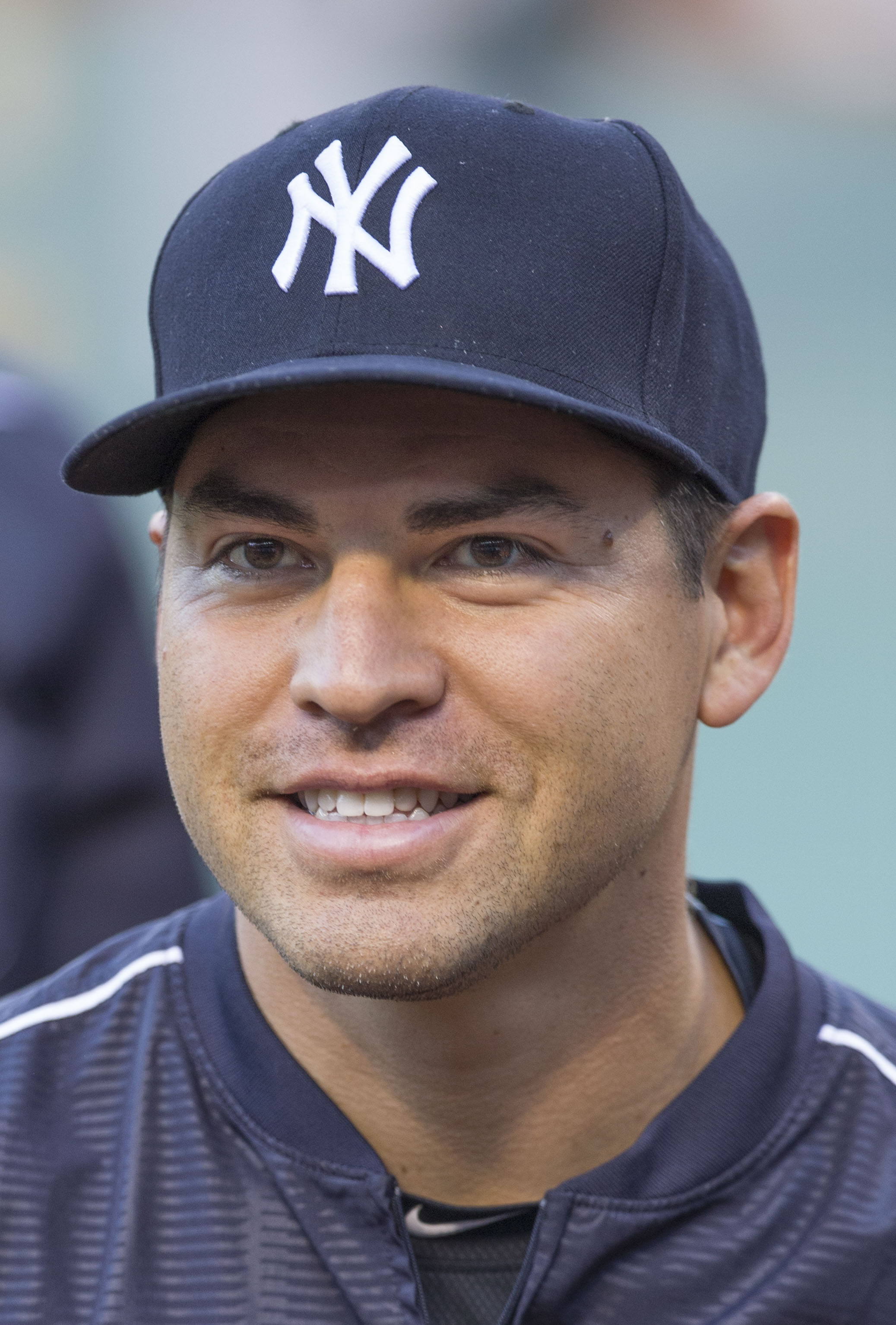
- Ellsbury with the New York Yankees in 2015
- Center fielder
- Born: September 11, 1983 (age 43); Madras, Oregon, U.S.
- Batted: Left Threw: Left

MLB debut
- June 30, 2007, for the Boston Red Sox

Last MLB appearance
- September 30, 2017, for the New York Yankees

MLB statistics
- Batting average: .284
- Home runs: 104
- Runs batted in: 512
- Stolen bases: 343
- Stats at Baseball Reference

Teams
- Boston Red Sox (2007–2013); New York Yankees (2014–2017)

Career highlights and awards
- All-Star (2011); 2× World Series champion (2007, 2013); Gold Glove Award (2011); Silver Slugger Award (2011); AL Comeback Player of the Year (2011); 3× AL stolen base leader (2008, 2009, 2013)

Jacoby McCabe Ellsbury (/dʒəˈkoʊbi/ jə-KOH-bee; born September 11, 1983) is an American former professional baseball center fielder. He played in Major League Baseball (MLB) for the Boston Red Sox from 2007 through 2013 and then played for the New York Yankees from 2014 to 2017. An enrolled member of the Colorado River Indian Tribes, Ellsbury is the first Native American of Navajo descent to play Major League Baseball.

Ellsbury was drafted by the Tampa Bay Devil Rays in the 23rd round of the 2002 MLB draft, but did not sign. After having played college baseball for three years at Oregon State University, he was selected in the 1st round by the Red Sox, as the 23rd overall pick in the 2005 draft. He made his major league debut for the Red Sox in 2007. In 2011, Ellsbury was named American League Comeback Player of the Year, was named to the American League All-Star team, won a Gold Glove and a Silver Slugger Award, became the first Red Sox player in history to be a member of the 30–30 club, and was the runner-up to Justin Verlander for the American League Most Valuable Player Award. He led the American League in stolen bases three times (in 2008, 2009, and 2013) and won World Series championships as a member of the Red Sox in 2007 and 2013.

After the 2013 season, Ellsbury signed a seven-year, $153 million contract with the Yankees. He played for the Yankees from 2014 to 2017, but was unable to play in 2018 or 2019 due to injury. Ellsbury was released by the Yankees on November 20, 2019. He ended his playing days as the single season and career record holder for reaching base via catcher's interference.

== Early life ==
Ellsbury was born on September 11, 1983, to Jim and Margie Ellsbury. He is the eldest of four children. The Ellsburys lived on the Warm Springs Indian Reservation until they moved to Madras, Oregon, when Jacoby was in kindergarten. He was raised in the Church of Jesus Christ of Latter-day Saints.

Ellsbury is an enrolled member of the Colorado River Indian Tribes. Margie Ellsbury is a full-blooded Navajo and a descendant of 19th-century tribal leader Ganado Mucho. Her father, Franklin McCabe, was a silversmith, and her mother was a traditional rug weaver. Jim Ellsbury is of English and German descent.

In Little League, Ellsbury often played with teammates up to three years older than him. At Madras High School, he lettered in five sports. In his senior year in baseball, he hit .537 with 65 stolen bases. In basketball, he averaged 23.6 points and 4.4 blocks per game. He finished his football career with nine interceptions and six kickoff returns for touchdowns. He went to Oregon State University where he was a Baseball America first-team All-American and Pac-10 Conference Co-Player of the year, with Trevor Crowe. In 2002, he played collegiate summer baseball with the Bend Elks of the West Coast League. In 2004, he played collegiate summer baseball with the Falmouth Commodores of the Cape Cod Baseball League. He was drafted in the first round of the 2005 MLB draft by the Boston Red Sox as a compensation pick from the Los Angeles Angels of Anaheim for the signing of Orlando Cabrera.

== Professional career ==
=== Minor leagues ===
Ellsbury began his professional career on July 14, 2005, with the Lowell Spinners in the Class A-Short Season New York–Penn League. On September 7, he tied a Lowell team record with three stolen bases in a single game. For the 2005 season, he batted .317 with 23 stolen bases in 35 games.

Ellsbury began the 2006 season ranked by Baseball America as the sixth-best prospect in the Red Sox' organization. He started the season with the Wilmington Blue Rocks of the Class A-Advanced Carolina League. On July 3, he tied a Wilmington franchise record by stealing four bases in a game. After batting .299 with 25 steals in 61 games and being named to the 2006 Carolina League All-Star team, Ellsbury was promoted to the Portland Sea Dogs of the Class AA Eastern League on July 12, 2006. Soon after his promotion to Portland, Ellsbury was named Eastern League Player of the Week for August 6–13. Ellsbury finished the season in Portland with .308 batting average and 16 steals in 50 games. The Red Sox selected him as their Minor League Defensive Player of the Year and Baserunner of the Year. The team assigned him to the Peoria Javelinas of the Arizona Fall League (AFL), an off-season developmental league for top prospects. In the AFL, Ellsbury hit .276 in 25 games. His defensive skills earned him a spot in the AFL Rising Stars All-Star game.

Ellsbury participated in the Red Sox' 2007 spring training camp in Fort Myers, Florida, as a non-roster invitee and was assigned to the minor league camp on March 9. He was rated the best prospect in the Red Sox' organization and the 33rd-best prospect in baseball for 2007 by Baseball America, while Sports Illustrated ranked Ellsbury as the 43rd-best prospect in baseball. Ellsbury began the 2007 season as the starting center fielder for the Sea Dogs and was promoted to the Pawtucket Red Sox of the Class AAA International League on May 4 after batting .452 in 17 games at Portland and being named the Eastern League Player of the Month for April. He was chosen to play in the 2007 All-Star Futures Game as part of the MLB All-Star festivities at AT&T Park in San Francisco. On August 24, Ellsbury set a new consecutive-game hitting streak record for Pawtucket with 25, besting the consecutive-game mark of 19 previously shared by Dave Stapleton and Dave Berg.

Ellsbury finished the season with 33 stolen bases for Pawtucket, which tied him for second in the International League. For the second consecutive season, the Red Sox selected him as their minor league Defensive Player of the Year and Baserunner of the Year.

=== Boston Red Sox ===
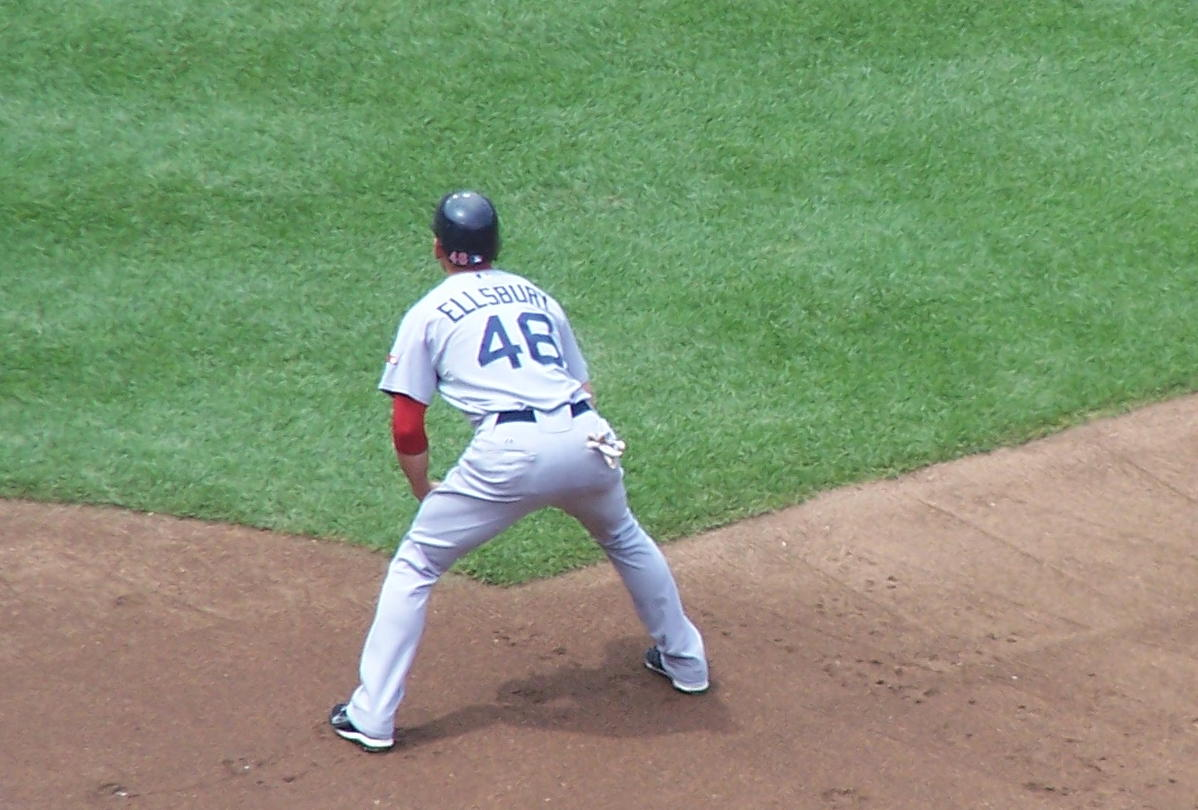
Ellsbury leading off first against the Baltimore Orioles

==== 2007 ====
The 2007 Baseball America Prospect Handbook compared Ellsbury to former Red Sox center fielder Johnny Damon, lauding his speed, hitting and fielding while noting his below-average throwing arm. After Coco Crisp was injured, the Red Sox purchased Ellsbury's contract and he received a call-up on June 30, in which he made his MLB debut in center field and hit ninth against the Texas Rangers at Fenway Park wearing number 46. Ellsbury is the first American Indian of Navajo descent to reach the major leagues. He recorded his first major league hit, an infield single off Robinson Tejeda, in the bottom of the third inning of that game. Ellsbury's first career stolen base came off pitcher Brandon McCarthy and catcher Gerald Laird of the Rangers on July 2. He also scored from second base in that game on a wild pitch. Johnny Pesky described the play as "the greatest single play I've ever seen in all my years in baseball". Ellsbury was optioned back to Pawtucket on July 5 after playing six games for the Red Sox.

On August 17, the Red Sox recalled Ellsbury from Pawtucket for the second game of a doubleheader, in which he led off and played center field. He was optioned back to Pawtucket after the game. When major league rosters expanded to 40 players on September 1, he was a September call-up by the Red Sox. On September 2, he hit his first major league home run, a solo shot which landed in the Red Sox bullpen, in the bottom of the fourth inning off Daniel Cabrera of the Baltimore Orioles. A September 2007 article in The New York Times described him as a "cult hero" who brings "speed, improved defense, and unbridled enthusiasm." Ellsbury was named MLB's American League Rookie of the Month for September 2007. With fewer than 130 major league at-bats, he still qualified as a rookie for the 2008 season.

During the 2007 postseason, with Crisp struggling, Ellsbury started in center field for Game 6 of the 2007 American League Championship Series (ALCS) against the Cleveland Indians, and started the remainder of the postseason for the Red Sox. In 11 postseason games, he hit .360 in 25 at-bats with two stolen bases. With his two doubles off Josh Fogg in the top of the third inning of Game 3 of the 2007 World Series on October 27, Ellsbury became the first rookie to hit two doubles in the same inning of a World Series game. After hitting another double, off Brian Fuentes in the eighth inning, he became the fourth rookie ever to hit three doubles in a World Series game. Ellsbury's four hits, including a single in the first inning, made him only the third rookie to ever accomplish the feat in the World Series, after Freddie Lindstrom in the 1924 World Series and Joe Garagiola in the 1946 World Series. He batted .438 with four doubles and a stolen base for the World Series. The Red Sox eventually won the World Series in a four-game sweep over the Rockies, giving Ellsbury his first career championship title.

==== 2008 ====
Heading into the 2008 season, Ellsbury was ranked the 13th-best prospect in baseball by Baseball America, the 16th-best prospect by Baseball Prospectus, and the 19th-best prospect by ESPN Scouts Inc. Ellsbury hit .224, with .291 on-base percentage (OBP), and a .347 slugging percentage in 16 spring training games and started in center field on Opening Day of the 2008 Major League Baseball season against the Oakland Athletics on March 25 at the Tokyo Dome in Tokyo, Japan. Ellsbury had his first career multi-home run game against the Los Angeles Angels of Anaheim on April 22. Ellsbury stole 25 consecutive bases without being caught, until he was caught stealing in a game on May 18. He was two stolen bases shy of the major league record held by Tim Raines in 1979. With three stolen bases against the Baltimore Orioles on May 30, he became the first Red Sox player to steal more than two bases in a game since Jerry Remy stole four in 1980. Ellsbury stole his 32nd base of the season on June 15, breaking the Red Sox' rookie record, set 100 years earlier by Amby McConnell. He finished the season with 50 steals to lead the American League, putting him third on the list of Red Sox all-time stolen base leaders for a single season, behind Tommy Harper (54) in 1973 and Tris Speaker (52) in 1912. Ellsbury finished third in the AL Rookie of the Year voting, behind Evan Longoria of Tampa Bay and Alexei Ramírez of the Chicago White Sox.

Ellsbury hit .333, with a .400 OBP and a .567 slugging percentage, and three stolen bases in the 2008 American League Division Series (ALDS), in which the Red Sox defeated the Los Angeles Angels of Anaheim, 3–1, in the best-of-five series. In the second inning of Game 3 of the ALDS, he hit the first three-run single in postseason history when Howie Kendrick and Torii Hunter let a pop-up fall to the ground between them. After going 0–for-14 in the first three games of the 2008 ALCS against the Tampa Bay Rays, Ellsbury was benched in favor of Crisp with only a pinch hitting at-bat in game 4. He did not play in the final three games of the series, and the Sox eventually lost the series 4–3.

In 2008, Ellsbury was one of three active non-Hispanic Native American players in Major League Baseball, along with Kyle Lohse and Joba Chamberlain.

==== 2009 ====
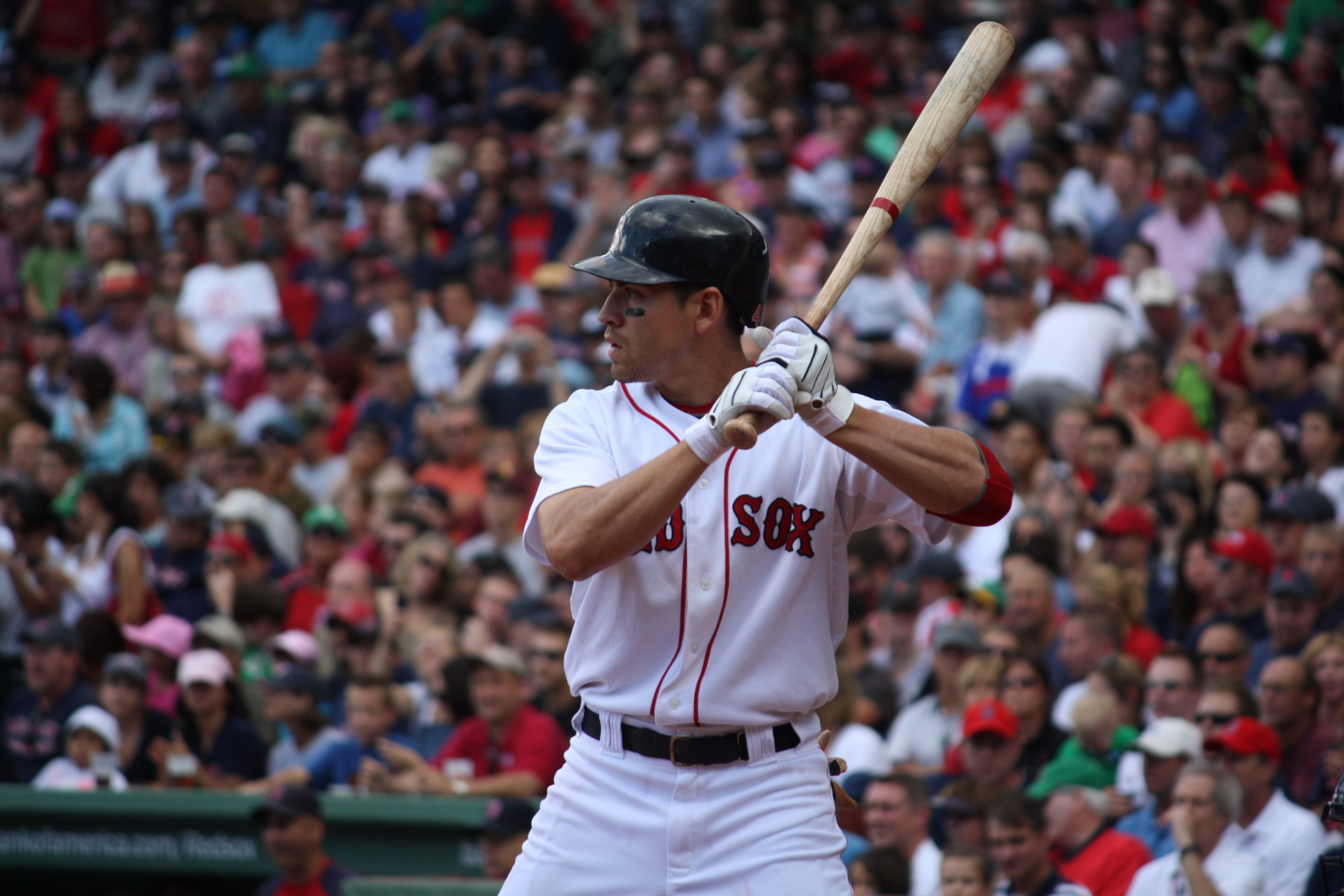
Ellsbury at bat against the Tampa Bay Rays in September 2009

Ellsbury played his 179th straight regular-season game without an error on April 12, 2009, breaking the franchise record for outfielders held by Mike Greenwell. On April 15, with six errorless chances, Ellsbury passed Coco Crisp for most errorless total chances by a center fielder, setting a new Red Sox franchise record of 433. Ellsbury tied a major league record for outfielders with 12 putouts in a nine-inning game on May 20, tying Earl Clark of the Boston Braves, who accomplished the feat in 1929, and Lyman Bostock of the Minnesota Twins, who did it in 1977. Ellsbury's streak of errorless games ended at 232, with 554 errorless chances, when he committed an error on June 17.

Ellsbury tied Tommy Harper's franchise single season record for stolen bases (54) on August 21. Ellsbury then broke the record with his 55th steal on August 25, against the Chicago White Sox. He finished the season with 70 stolen bases, the most in the American League, and he also led the league in triples with 10. He won Defensive Player of the Year in MLB.com's annual This Year in Baseball Awards 2009.

==== 2010 ====
During the offseason, Ellsbury changed his uniform number from 46 to 2, which had belonged to the Red Sox' former bench coach, Brad Mills, who left the organization to become the manager of the Houston Astros. With the Red Sox signing free agent center fielder Mike Cameron and not re-signing left fielder Jason Bay, Ellsbury became the Red Sox' starting left fielder. The move was made as the result of Cameron's experience in center and inexperience in left. Manager Terry Francona expressed excitement over the prospect of playing a true center fielder in left field, creating a larger fielding range and more aggressive style.

On April 11, Ellsbury collided with Red Sox third baseman Adrián Beltré in a game against the Kansas City Royals, and the collision resulted in hairline fractures to four of his left ribs. He was put on the 15-day disabled list on April 20, and he returned to the Red Sox on May 22. He returned to the 15-day DL on May 28 after playing in only three games due to residual soreness in his ribs from the collision with Beltré. He met with a thoracic specialist who advised him that his ribs should be further along in the healing process before he would be able to play. He started a rehab assignment with Lowell on July 26, and rejoined the Red Sox on August 4. Ellsbury returned to the 15-day disabled list on August 14 after re-injuring his ribs in a game against the Texas Rangers. He did not play again in 2010.

==== 2011 ====
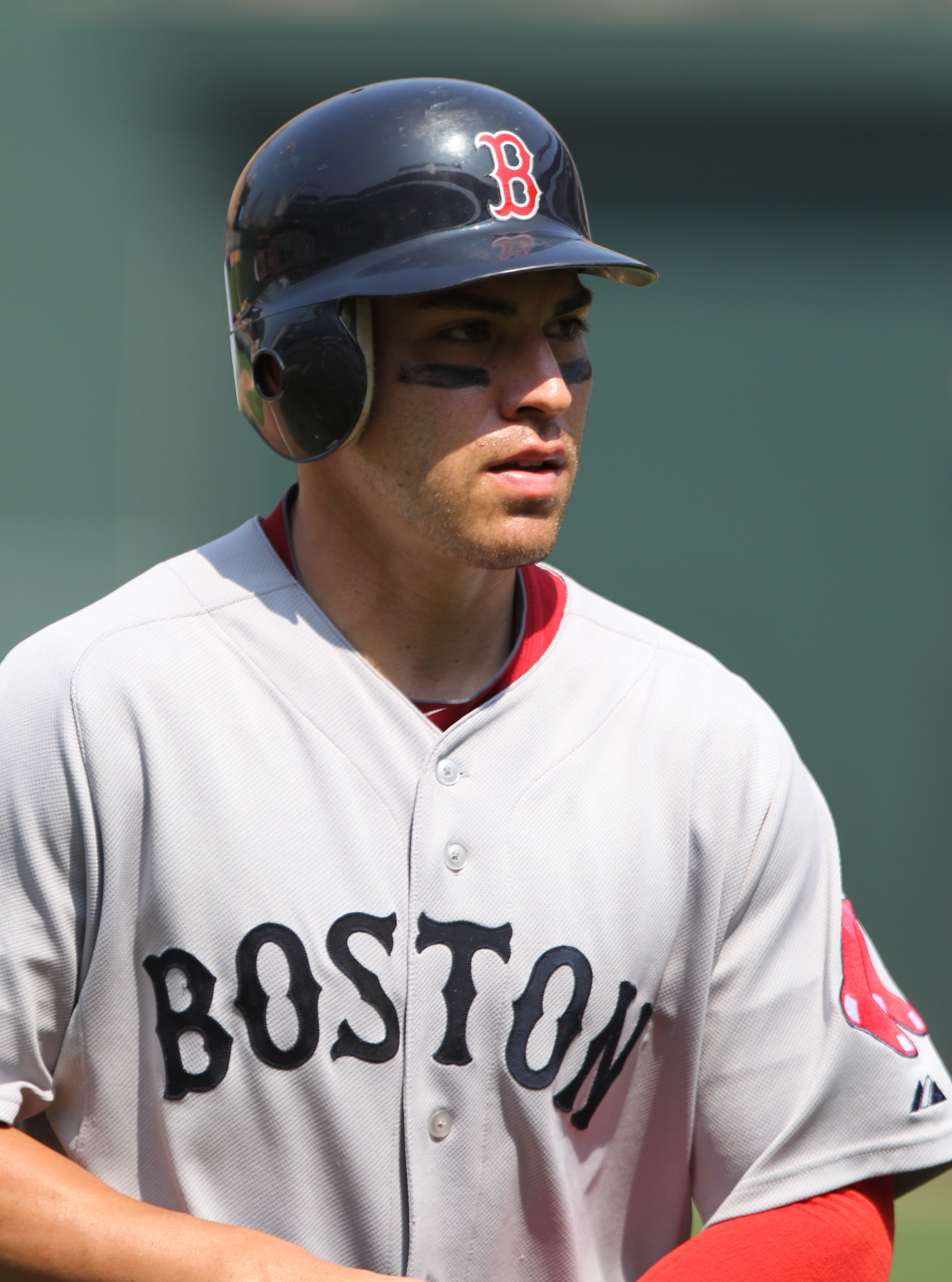
Ellsbury with the Red Sox in 2011

During games on August 2 and 3, Ellsbury had walk-off hits in the back-to-back games against the Cleveland Indians; a single off Vinnie Pestano and a home run off Joe Smith. On August 6, he hit a three-run home run and drove in a career-high six runs in Boston's 10–4 win over the New York Yankees. On September 25, he hit two home runs during the first game of a doubleheader against the Yankees to become the first member of the Boston Red Sox to join the 30–30 club.

Ellsbury finished the season with career highs in home runs (32), hits (212), RBIs (105), runs (119), and batting average (.321). He also led the American League in power-speed number (35.2), total bases (364), and extra-base hits (83). He won his first Gold Glove Award, and finished as one of only two qualifying players to complete the season with a 1.000 fielding percentage. Jacoby was awarded a Silver Slugger Award for his hitting, joining teammate Adrián González as the only American League players to win both the Gold Glove and Silver Slugger Awards in 2011. Ellsbury was voted the American League Comeback Player of the Year and finished second in the 2011 American League Most Valuable Player Award balloting with 242 points, losing to Justin Verlander (280).

==== 2012 ====
On April 13, 2012, while attempting to slide under Tampa Bay Rays shortstop Reid Brignac in an attempt to break up a double play, Ellsbury collided with the shortstop. His right shoulder was injured when Brignac fell on top of his exposed shoulder. He was placed on the disabled list with a subluxation of the shoulder on April 14. He was activated from the DL and returned to the Red Sox lineup on July 13, and finished the season with a .271 batting average, four home runs, 26 RBI, and 14 stolen bases in only 74 games played.

==== 2013 ====
Ellsbury set a franchise record for most stolen bases in a game with five on May 30.

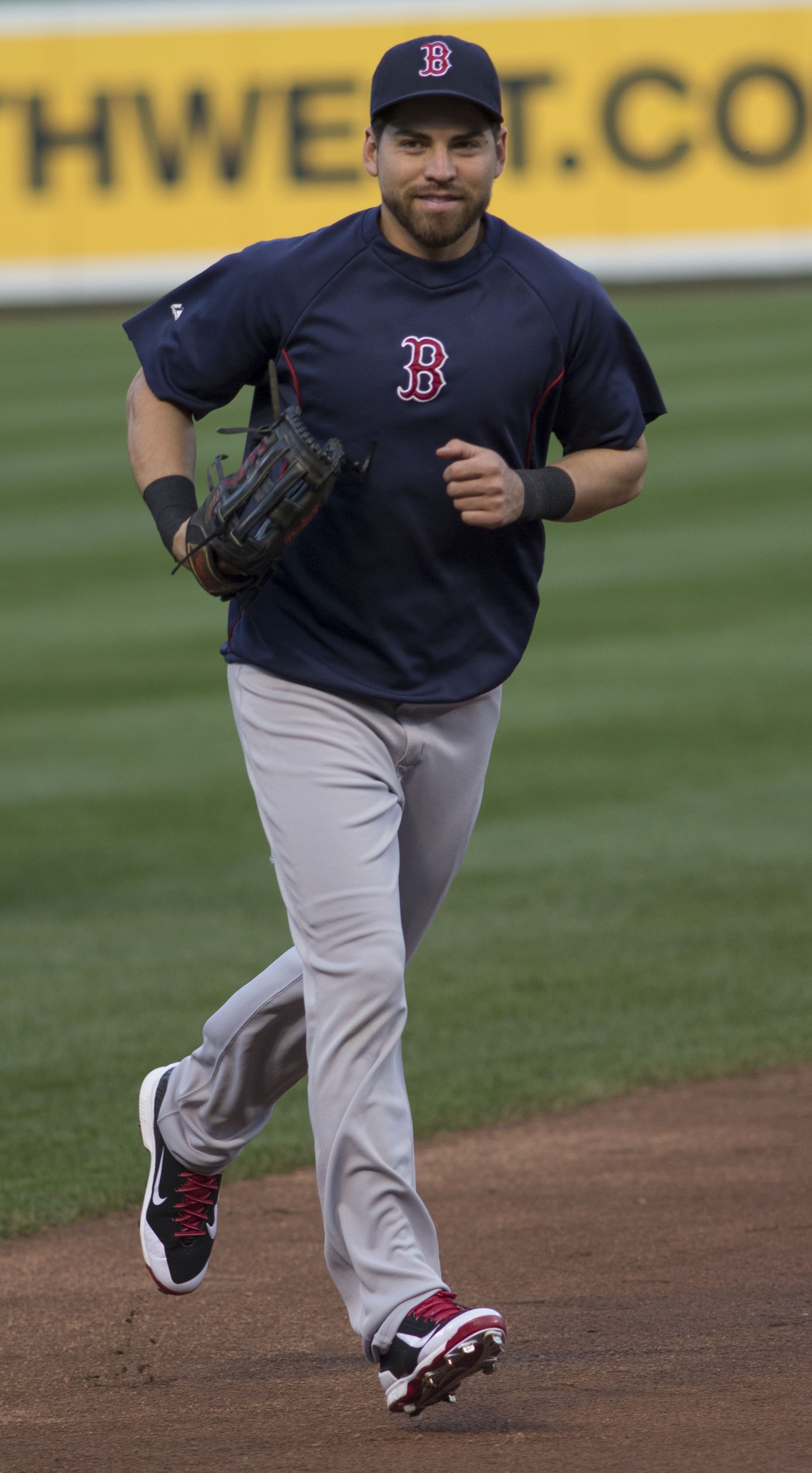
Ellsbury on September 28, 2013, at Camden Yards during warmups

In the August 28 game against the Orioles, Ellsbury suffered a compression fracture by fouling a ball off his right foot. He was taken to the Steadman Clinic in Vail, Colo., for treatment from Dr. Thomas Clanton, who cleared him to rejoin the Red Sox lineup on September 25, well ahead of the preliminary prognosis.

Ellsbury turned in a strong performance in the 2013 postseason, batting .500 in the 2013 ALDS and .318 in the 2013 ALCS. In the 2013 World Series, Ellsbury started the eventual series-winning rally in Game 6 with a single and earned his second World Series ring as a member of the Red Sox. Ellsbury's contract expired on October 31, 2013, and he became a free agent for the first time in his career.

=== New York Yankees ===
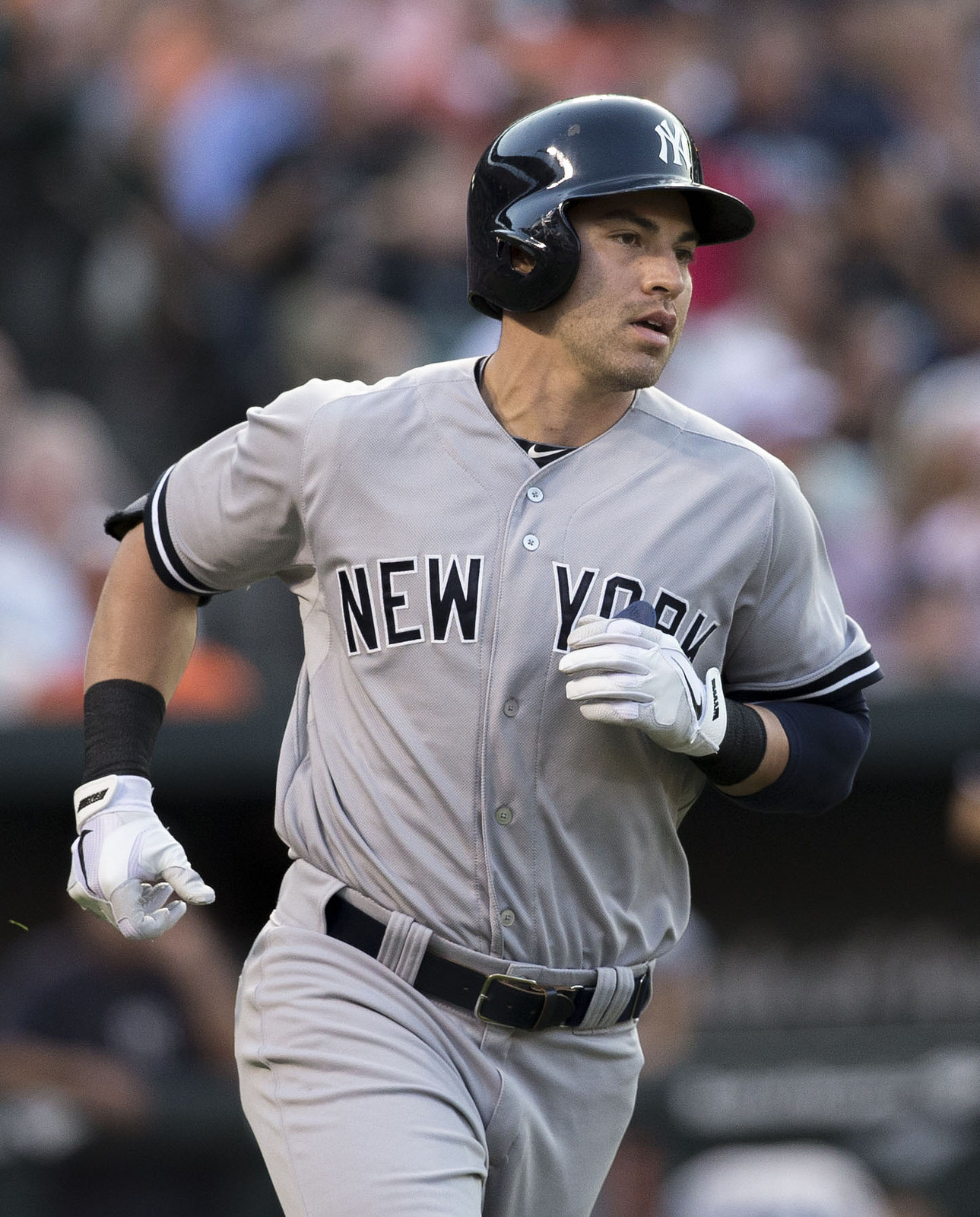
Ellsbury with the Yankees in 2014

On December 3, 2013, Ellsbury and the New York Yankees agreed in principle to a seven-year, $153 million deal, including an option for an eighth year that could increase the value of the contract to $169 million. The contract became official on December 7.

==== 2014 ====
On April 22, 2014, Ellsbury played his first game at Fenway Park since leaving the Red Sox to join the Yankees. He received an ovation of boos from Red Sox fans. In his first season with the Yankees, Ellsbury hit .271 with 16 home runs and 39 stolen bases. He remained healthy for most of the season, playing in 149 games, the third-most games he ever played in one season. Ellsbury's home run count was the second-highest of his career next to his 2011 season. He also led the American League in power-speed number (22.7).

==== 2015 ====
Ellsbury had a hot start to 2015, batting .363 up to May 7. On May 20, 2015, Ellsbury was placed on the 15-day disabled list due to a right knee sprain. Prior to the injury, he compiled a .324 batting average in 148 at-bats. After missing nearly two months, Ellsbury returned on July 8, 2015, and had an extremely rough end to the season. He batted .224 in 74 games after he returned from the disabled list and did not start in the 2015 American League Wild Card Game, losing his job in favor of Chris Young. He ended the underwhelming season hitting .257/.318/.345 with seven home runs and 21 stolen bases in 111 games.

==== 2016 ====
On April 22, 2016, Ellsbury executed a straight steal of home against Matt Moore of the Tampa Bay Rays during a full count, tying the game at 3. It marked the first time a Yankee successfully stole home since Chris Young did so in 2014 as part of a double steal, and the first straight steal of home since Derek Jeter in 2001. It was Ellsbury's second career steal of home; the first occurred in 2009 against Andy Pettitte and the Yankees. On June 8, Ellsbury hit the highest home run of the MLB season against the Los Angeles Angels, reaching a recorded 151 feet in the air. On July 20, Ellsbury reached base via catcher's interference for the ninth time in the season, setting a new single-season MLB record. The record had previously belonged to Roberto Kelly, who reached base eight times on catcher's interference in 1992. Ellsbury would end the season with 12 catcher's interferences. Ellsbury played in 148 games in 2016. While he remained fully healthy, the 2016 season was another underwhelming one for Ellsbury offensively, as he hit .263/.330/.374 with nine home runs and 20 stolen bases, the latter being his lowest in a healthy season.

==== 2017 ====
On April 28, 2017, Ellsbury hit his first career grand slam against the Baltimore Orioles in a 14-11 Yankees comeback win. It was also the 100th home run of his career. On May 24, Ellsbury made a superb catch at the center field wall, but also banged his head at the wall, causing him to suffer a concussion. He was placed on the 7-day disabled list the next day. On June 10, Joe Girardi stated that Ellsbury had lost his job as the Yankees' starting center fielder to Aaron Hicks, who would continue to start even when Ellsbury is healthy. Ellsbury was activated from the disabled list on June 26 after missing 29 games, the same day that Hicks was placed on the 10-day disabled list with an oblique injury. With the rise of rookie outfielder Clint Frazier, Ellsbury lost his job again and was relegated to the bench. On his 34th birthday on September 11, Ellsbury reached via catcher's interference for the 30th time in his career, which broke Pete Rose's career record of 29. In 2017, he batted .264/.348/.402 with seven home runs and 22 stolen bases.

==== 2018 ====
On March 19, 2018, the Yankees announced that Ellsbury would not be ready for Opening Day due to a right oblique strain. On April 3, it was revealed that Ellsbury had been diagnosed with a hip ailment. On August 6, he had surgery to repair a torn labrum in his left hip and was declared to be out for the rest of the 2018 season.

==== 2019 ====
Ellsbury began the 2019 year on the 10-day injured list due to a foot injury. On April 20, he was transferred to the 60-day injured list. It was revealed that he was dealing with plantar fasciitis and a shoulder injury. On September 8, the Yankees ruled Ellsbury out for the season.

Ellsbury was released by the Yankees on November 20, 2019. The team owed Ellsbury's $21 million 2020 salary, together with a $5 million buyout for the 2021 season. The Yankees planned not to pay Ellsbury the money as they claimed that he received unauthorized medical care. The players association was not pleased about this hearing and filed a grievance. Arbiters sided with Ellsbury and the Yankees paid the remaining owed money on his contract. Following Ellsbury's release, sportswriters described his contract as among the worst in Yankees history.

== Personal life ==
Ellsbury was raised as a member of the Church of Jesus Christ of Latter-day Saints, but he and his three brothers stopped attending services when Jacoby was a teenager; as reported in The Boston Globe in 2008, Ellsbury said, "I try not to get [God] too involved in baseball. What I wish for is good health."

Ellsbury was one of the victims of the $8 billion fraud perpetrated by wealth manager Allen Stanford; although he had some assets frozen, it did not cause him any significant hardship akin to those suffered by Johnny Damon and Xavier Nady.

Ellsbury and Kelsey Hawkins married in December 2012, and they have four children.

In 2010, Ellsbury released a Zinfandel wine called ZinfandEllsbury through Charity Wines, with 100% of his proceeds donated among three charities: The Navajo Relief Fund, Project Bread: The Walk for Hunger, and Ellsbury Read Project. The wine launched alongside a charity wine by former Boston Red Sox teammate Josh Beckett, called Chardon-K.

In June 2014, Ellsbury donated $1 million to his alma mater Oregon State University as part of a $3 million renovation project at Goss Stadium. The Beavers' new home locker room was named the Jacoby Ellsbury Locker Room in his honor.

== Accomplishments ==
- 2× World Series champion 2007, 2013
- 2007 AL Rookie of the Month (September)
- 2008 Red Sox rookie single season stolen bases record
- 2008 AL stolen base leader
- 2009 all-time Red Sox single season stolen bases record
- 2009 MLB stolen base leader
- 2011 AL Comeback Player of the Year
- 2011 All-Star
- 2013 all-time Red Sox single game stolen base record
- 2013 MLB stolen base leader

== See also ==
- List of Major League Baseball annual stolen base leaders
- List of Major League Baseball annual triples leaders
