= Kah-Nee-Ta =

Resort on the Warm Springs Indian Reservation, Oregon, U.S.

Kah-Nee-Ta Resort & Spa
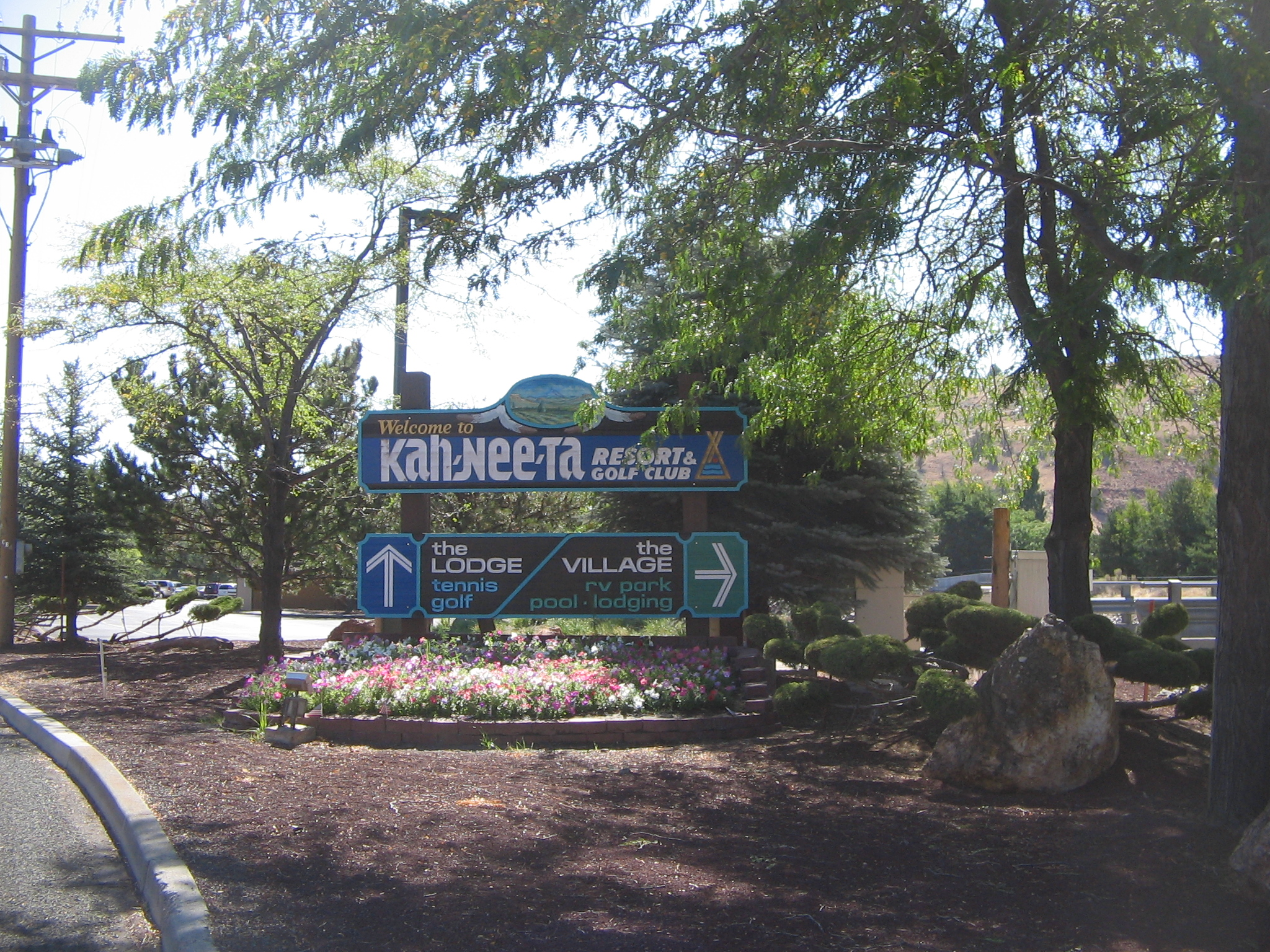
- Kah-Nee-Ta sign in 2009
- Interactive map of the Kah-Nee-Ta Resort & Spa area

General information
- Classification: Resort
- Location: Warm Springs Indian Reservation, Oregon, U.S.
- Coordinates: 44.859°N 121.197°W
- Opening: 1950s
- Owner: Confederated Tribes of Warm Springs

Website
- kahneeta.com

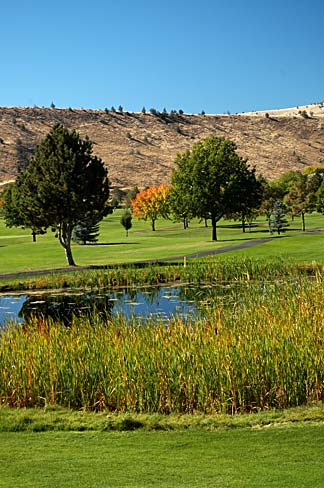
The golf course

Kah-Nee-Ta Resort & Spa is a resort in central Oregon, United States, on the Warm Springs Indian Reservation, near the community of Warm Springs in Jefferson County. It closed on September 5, 2018, laying off all its employees. It was announced on June 20, 2024 that the resort would reopen on July 15, 2024.

== History ==
Kah-Nee-Ta Resort was started by a non-Indigenous doctor who owned land around the hot springs of the Warm Springs River. In 1961, the Tribes purchased the land back and started to rebuild the spa. The great flood of 1964 damaged the spa and the bridge accessing it. In 1964–1965, the Tribes built an Olympic-sized swimming pool, cottages, restaurant, and tepees.

=== Expansion ===
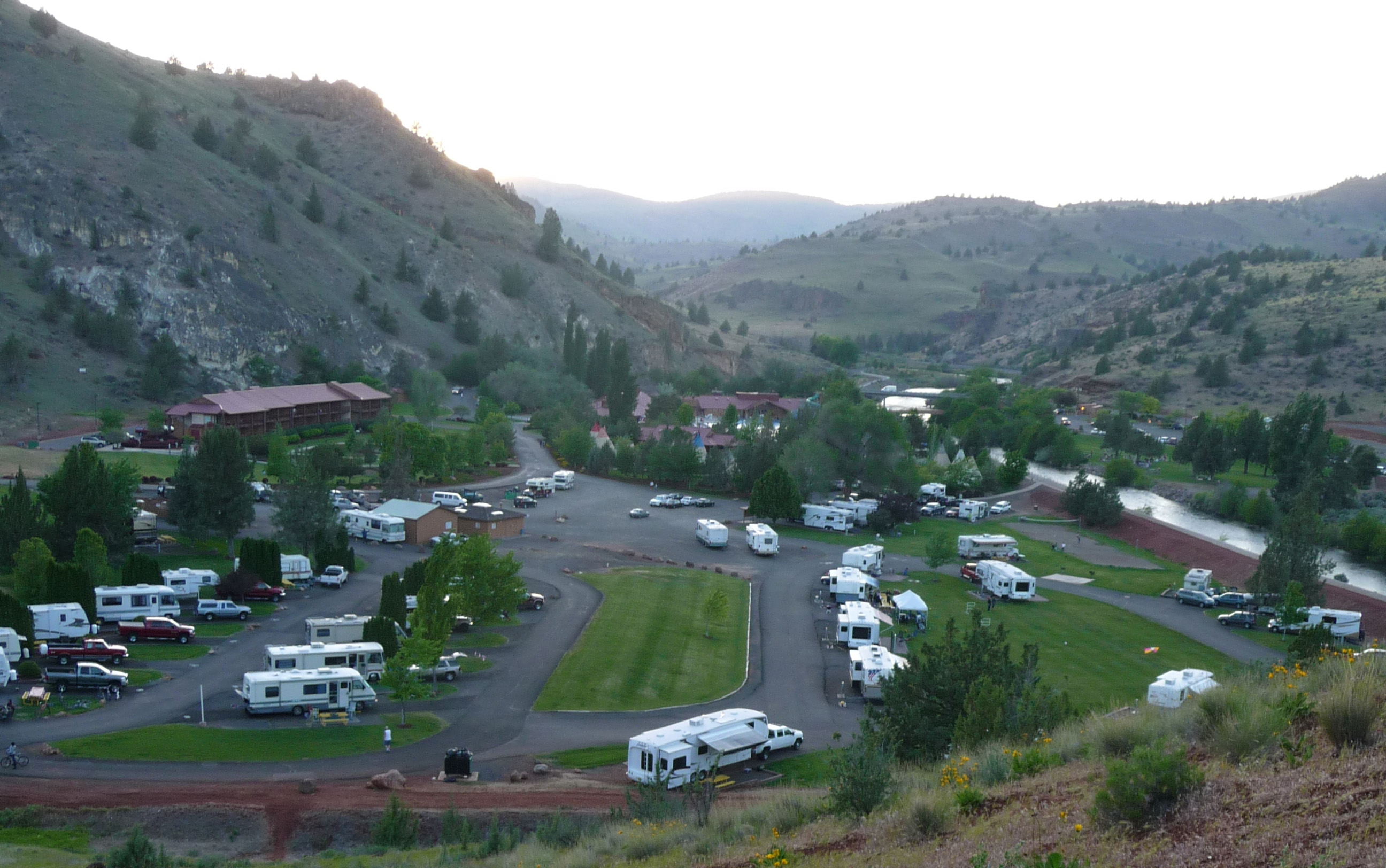
The campground at Hot Springs Resort

In 1971, the Tribes began construction of the Kah-Nee-Ta Lodge using funds from low-interest loans from the Economic Development Administration (EDA). Zimmer Gunsul Frasca Architects designed the lodge. Today it stands as an example of seventies architecture, with strong North America indigenous and Scandinavian influences. The gigantic fireplace in the lobby represents all of that: Raw concrete, North America Indigenous symbols, and Artichoke lamps by Poul Henningsen for Louis Poulsen.

In 1995, the Tribes expanded operations to include a casino and improved convention center. In 2001, the resort and casino were combined to form Kah-Nee-Ta High Desert Resort & Casino, which also included a golf course.

=== Casino relocation ===
While Kah-Nee-Ta's casino netted $2–4 million annually, the tribes expected a more accessible location to earn $8–12 million. The resort's casino closed in December 2011 in preparation for relocating the business to a new property beside U.S. Route 26, where it was hoped that the more convenient location for travellers would draw even more customers. The casino reopened as the Indian Head Casino in February 2012.

=== Demise of the resort ===
The resort shifted its focus to its family-friendly amenities, including the golf course and spa.

The resort filed a WARN notice with the State on 6 July 2018, announcing plans to permanently lay off 146 employees starting 5 September 2018. Along with the layoffs came the closure of the resort, which included its lodge, spa, hotel, and RV park.

In spite of efforts to maintain operations, the resort closed in September 2018.

=== Partial Reopening ===
In the last week of February, 2022, the Confederated Tribes of Warm Springs approved spending $4.58 million to reopen portions of the resort. Included in the proposed facilities to come back online are the Village, which includes soaking pools, teepees, RV Sites and a 30-room hotel. The Lodge and golf course are not scheduled to be reopened. The resort reopened in July 2024.

== See also ==
- Gambling in Oregon
- Columbia Gorge casino, a proposed casino in the Columbia River Gorge to be operated by the Confederated Tribes of Warm Springs.
- Indian Head Casino – successor to the casino formerly at Kah-Nee-Ta Resort
