= Warm Springs River =

River in Oregon, United States

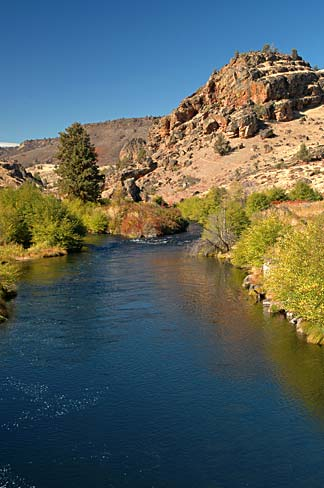

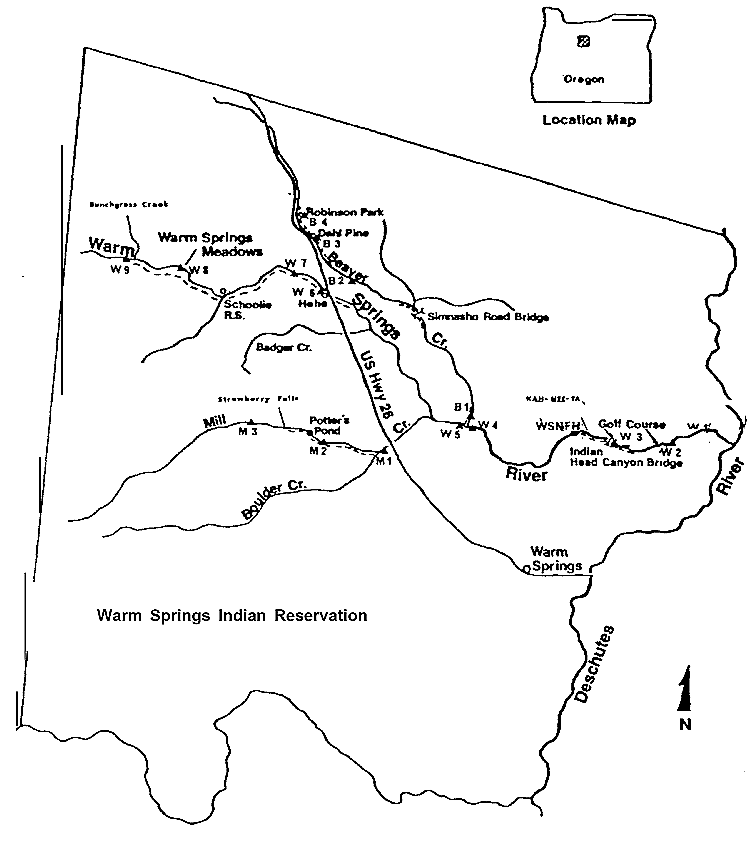
- Map of the Warm Springs River basin

- Location within Oregon

Location
- Country: United States
- State: Oregon
- County: Wasco

Physical characteristics
- Source: Cascade Range
  - location: north of Olallie Butte
  - coordinates: 44°57′39″N 121°47′21″W
  - elevation: 4,069 ft (1,240 m)
- Mouth: Deschutes River
  - coordinates: 44°51′28″N 121°04′09″W
  - elevation: 1,240 ft (380 m)
- Length: 50 mi (80 km)
- Basin size: 526 sq mi (1,360 km^{2})
- Discharge
  - location: 2.5 miles (4.0 km) east of Kah-Nee-Ta, river mile 4.6 (7.4 km upstream from mouth)
  - average: 432 cu ft/s (12.2 m^{3}/s)
  - minimum: 149 cu ft/s (4.2 m^{3}/s)
  - maximum: 22,600 cu ft/s (640 m^{3}/s)

The Warm Springs River is a tributary of the Deschutes River in north-central Oregon in the United States. It flows generally southeast along the east side of the Cascade Range. The watershed is approximately between Mount Jefferson and Timothy Lake, and the northwestern and southwestern boundaries of the Warm Springs Indian Reservation coincide with the watershed. The headwaters are less than 1/4 mile (0.40 km) from the Wasco County–Clackamas County boundary (which follows the Cascade crest). The river flows generally eastward, with occasional diagonals southeast or northeast. It joins the Deschutes River at river mile 83.7 (134.7 km upstream from the mouth of the Deschutes).

Named tributaries of the river from source to mouth are Dry and Bunchgrass creeks followed by the South Fork Warm Springs River. Then come Badger, Mill, and Beaver creeks.

== See also ==
- List of rivers of Oregon
