= Proposed Columbia Gorge casino =

Coordinates: 45.680°N 121.857°W

In the first decade of the 2000s, the Confederated Tribes of Warm Springs (a group of Indian tribes in the U.S. state of Oregon) sought to build a casino in the Columbia River Gorge. They ended their pursuit of the project in 2013. They considered various sites, as early as 1999; the most extensive plan called for a 60-acre (24 ha) facility with 250 hotel rooms in Cascade Locks, Oregon. The proposed site is within the Columbia River Gorge National Scenic Area, and adjacent to a federally designated wilderness area, but within the city limits of Cascade Locks. (The Columbia River National Scenic Area specifically exempts economic development projects within city limits and supports such growth for cities on both sides of the Columbia River).

The plan, which was opposed by Oregon Governor John Kitzhaber, but supported by the City of Cascade Locks, and the government of Hood River County, must be approved by the United States Department of the Interior, and would be the first (or seventh) off-reservation casino in the state.

== Political context ==
The Siletz tribe advocated for an off-reservation casino in Troutdale as early as 1992, drawing opposition from then-governor Barbara Roberts.

As early as 1998, the Confederated Tribes of Warm Springs owned property in Hood River, and were entertaining controversial plans to open a casino there or in Cascade Locks. The Warm Springs tribes have operated the Kah-Nee-Ta resort since the 1960s; that resort, located 11 miles from Highway 26, is not very accessible to Portland metropolitan area, leading the tribes to seek a more lucrative location.

Then-governor John Kitzhaber opposed the plans, on two principles: that each tribe should have only one casino, and that tribal casinos should be on tribal trust land established before the Indian Gaming Regulatory Act of 1988. Federal law gave Kitzhaber the power to deny the tribe the Cascade Locks location, because it had not been held in trust prior to the 1988 law. He had no such power over the Hood River site or other land the tribes had held for a longer period of time.

Kitzhaber ultimately overruled the Cascade Locks location, but the issue overshadowed the 2002 gubernatorial election of Ted Kulongoski. The tribes made record political contributions during that election. Kulongoski, who took no position on the issue during the election, received $40,000 for his campaign from Indian tribes.

In 2001, the Confederated Tribes purchased an additional 120 acres (0.49 km^{2}) of land east of the city of Hood River, adjoining 40 acres (160,000 m^{2}) it already owned. The Confederated Tribes then pursued two separate plans for casinos in the gorge until 2004: one in Cascade Locks, the other on the Hood River property. The Hood River plan, which would have called for an eight-story casino, was opposed by Hood River residents. Hood River County Commissioner Carol York was also a strong advocate of the Cascade Locks location, rather than the Hood River location.

The project has the support of Oregon Congressman Greg Walden (R), who represents this area in Congress. Also publicly supporting the project is Oregon Senator Ted Ferrioli (R) and former Oregon Governors Vic Atiyeh (R) and Ted Kulongoski (D).

Kulongoski and the Warm Springs tribe entered an agreement in 2005 permitting the plans to proceed.

Opposition to a casino in Cascade Locks has been led by the Confederated Tribes of the Grand Ronde Community of Oregon, and has included other organizations: the Oregon Restaurant Association, Friends of Columbia Gorge, NoGorgeCasino, a small but vocal group of residents and the Oregon Family Council. Congressman David Wu has also opposed the casino. The Grand Ronde group was the biggest campaign spender in the 2006 gubernatorial primary election, opposing Kulongoski and Kevin Mannix. Grand Ronde, which operates Spirit Mountain Casino, spent over $800,000 in that cycle. In the 2010 gubernatorial race, all four major candidates (including Kitzhaber, who was ultimately reelected that year) announced their opposition to the plan.

The United States Secretary of the Interior would have to approve a casino for it to move forward. Secretary Dirk Kempthorne of the George W. Bush administration generally opposed off-reservation casinos, but did not make a decision; his successor was expected to consider the proposed casino, along with an off-reservation casino in La Center, Washington being proposed by the Cowlitz Tribe. In January 2011 the Interior Department approved a compact between the tribes and the state. The remaining steps as of 2011 would include the demonstration of compliance with the Indian Gaming Regulatory Act and approval from the governor. In 2011, the tribes announced plans to move the Kah-Nee-Ta resort closer to Route 26, as they continued their long-term pursuit of a casino in Cascade Locks.

The Warm Springs tribes ended their pursuit of a casino in the gorge in summer 2013.

== See also ==
- Bureau of Indian Affairs
- Gambling in Oregon
- List of casinos in Oregon
- National Indian Gaming Commission
- Native American gambling enterprises
