= The Museum at Warm Springs =

Coordinates: 44.764643°N 121.270429°W

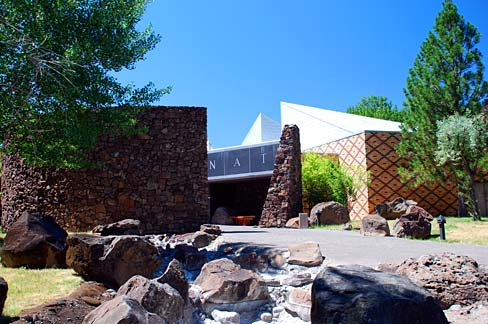
The Museum at Warm Springs

The Museum at Warm Springs is a museum in Warm Springs, Oregon, United States, on the Warm Springs Indian Reservation. The museum houses a large collection of North American Indian artifacts. It was opened in 1993 and is spread over 25,000 square feet (2,300 m^{2}). The museum was constructed at a cost of $7.6 million.

== Facilities ==
The museum has a vast collection of artifacts, historic photographs, murals, graphics, and rare documents. Other resources include interactive multimedia exhibits that include a Wasco wedding, song chamber, and traditional Hoop dance.

The museum offers walking trails along Shitike Creek. There is a picnic area and an outdoor amphitheater for performances and demonstrations.
