= Warm Springs, Oregon =

Unincorporated community in the state of Oregon, United States

- Census-designated place
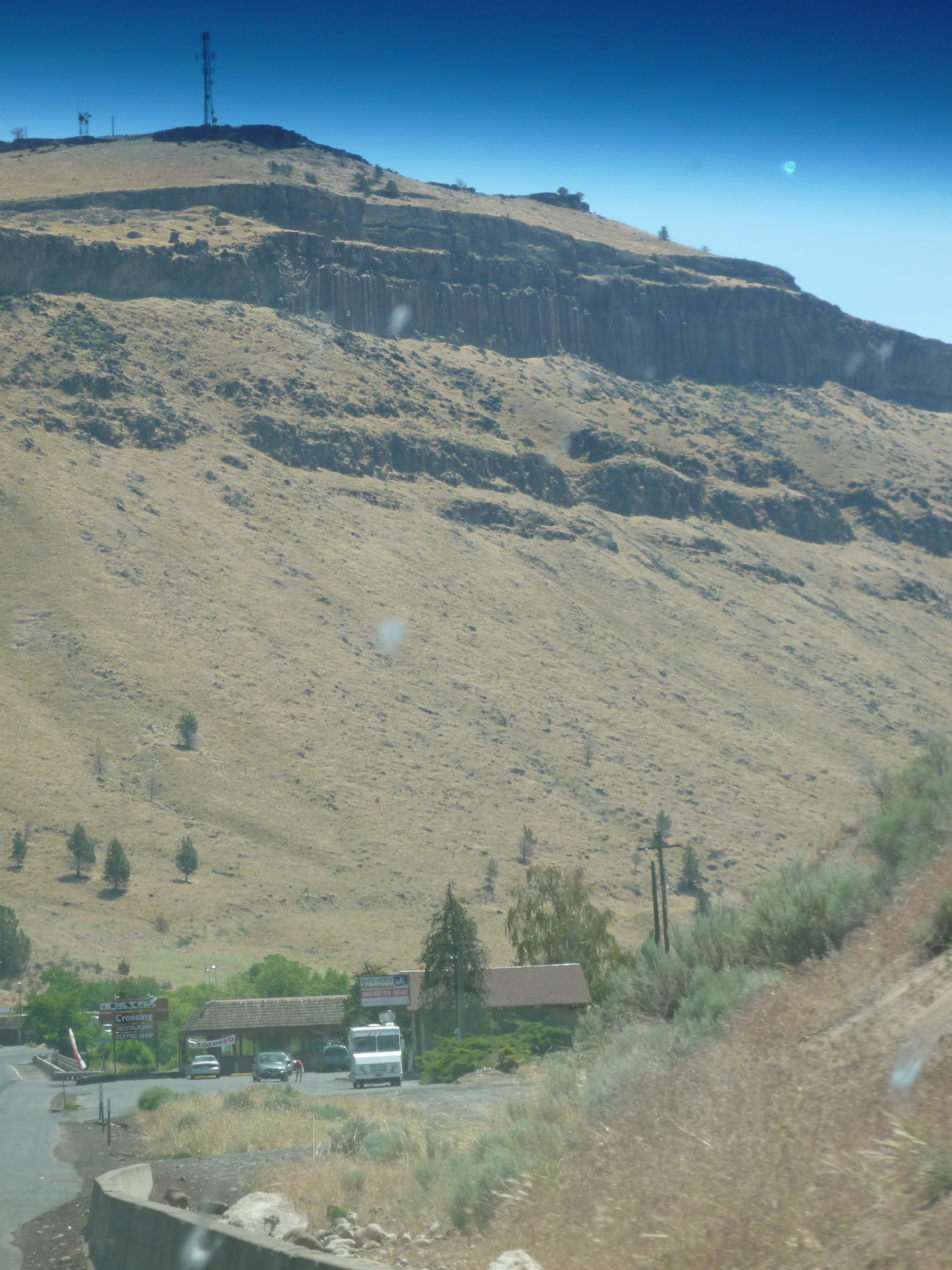
- Warm Springs

- Location of Warm Springs, Oregon
- Coordinates: 44°45′37″N 121°16′6″W
- Country: United States
- State: Oregon
- County: Jefferson

Area
  - Total: 42.57 sq mi (110.25 km^{2})
  - Land: 42.44 sq mi (109.92 km^{2})
  - Water: 0.13 sq mi (0.34 km^{2})
- Elevation: 1,539 ft (469 m)

Population (2020)
  - Total: 2,435
  - Density: 57.4/sq mi (22.15/km^{2})
- Time zone: UTC-8 (Pacific (PST))
  - Summer (DST): UTC-7 (PDT)
- ZIP code: 97761
- Area code: 541
- FIPS code: 41-78600
- GNIS feature ID: 1128648

Warm Springs is a census-designated place (CDP) and an unincorporated community in Jefferson County, Oregon, United States. Located on the Warm Springs Indian Reservation, the community is also known as the "Warm Springs Agency". As of the 2020 census, Warm Springs had a population of 2,435.

== Geography ==
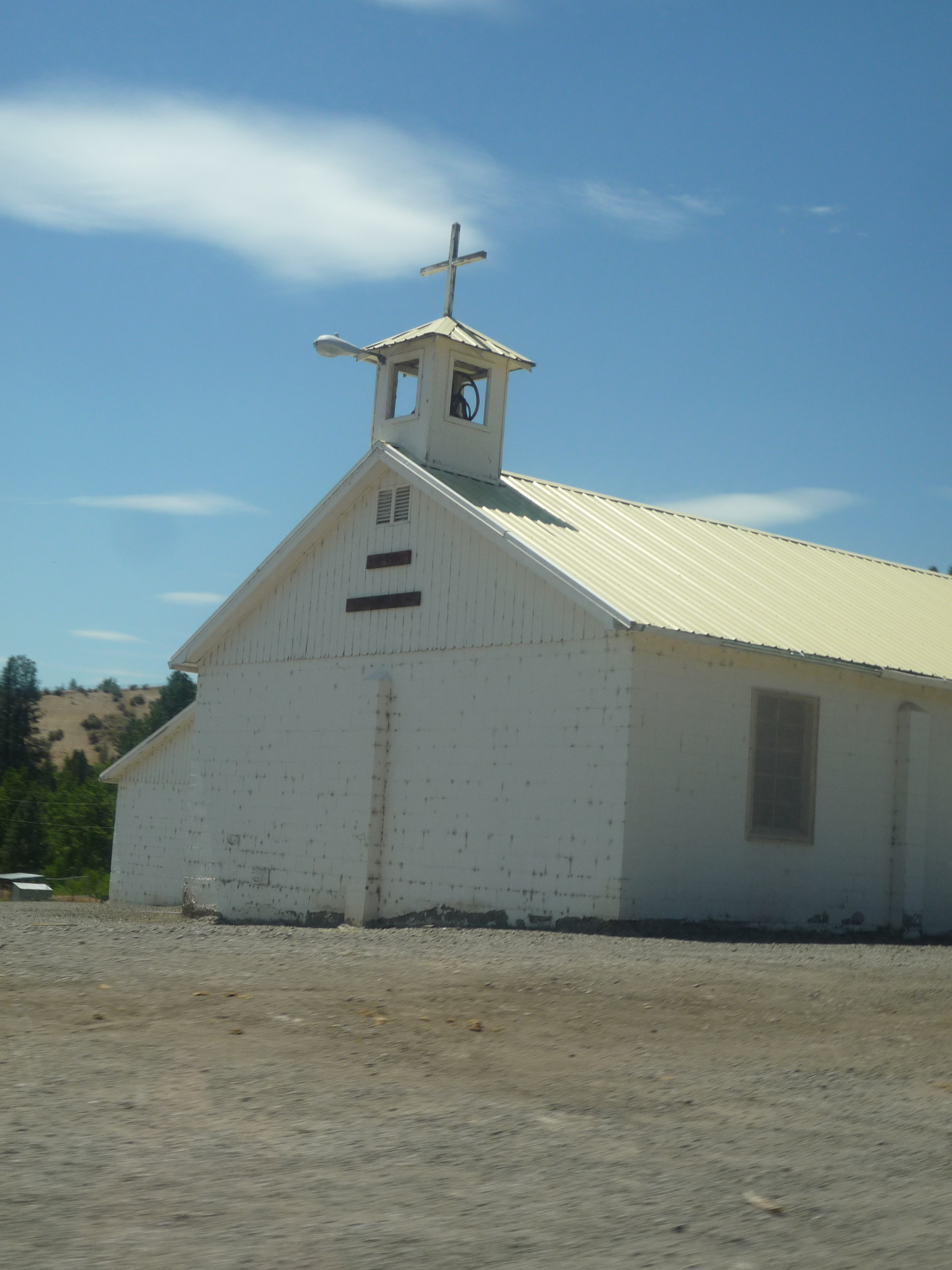
A church in Warm Springs

Warm Springs is located in northern Jefferson County at 44°45′37″N 121°16′06″W (44.760168, -121.268233). The center of the community is situated at 1,539 feet (469 m) above sea level in the valley of Shitike Creek. The Deschutes River forms the eastern boundary of the CDP.

U.S. Route 26 passes through the center of the community, leading southeast 14 miles (23 km) to Madras and northwest 100 miles (160 km) to Portland.

According to the United States Census Bureau, the Warm Springs CDP has a total area of 42.6 square miles (110.4 km^{2}), of which 42.5 square miles (110.1 km^{2}) are land and 0.1 square miles (0.3 km^{2}), or 0.30%, are water.

=== Climate ===
This region experiences warm, (but not hot), and dry summers, with no average monthly temperatures above 71.6 °F (22.0 °C). According to the Köppen Climate Classification system, Warm Springs has a warm-summer Mediterranean climate, abbreviated "Csb" on climate maps.

== Demographics ==
As of the census of 2000, there were 2,431 people, 603 households, and 507 families residing in the CDP. The population density was 57.2 inhabitants per square mile (22.1/km^{2}). There were 642 housing units at an average density of 15.1 per square mile (5.8/km^{2}). The racial makeup of the CDP was 93.46% Native American, 2.47% White, 0.08% African American, 0.08% Pacific Islander, 1.11% from other races, and 2.80% from two or more races. Hispanic or Latino of any race were 6.50% of the population.

There were 603 households, out of which 50.9% had children under the age of 18 living with them, 35.3% were married couples living together, 34.2% had a female householder with no husband present, and 15.9% were non-families. 11.4% of all households were made up of individuals, and 2.7% had someone living alone who was 65 years of age or older. The average household size was 4.02 and the average family size was 4.19.

Historical population
Census	Pop.	Note	%±
1930	50		—
1940	150		200.0%
1950	550		266.7%
1960	450		−18.2%
1970	550		22.2%
1980	500		−9.1%
1990	2,287		357.4%
2000	2,431		6.3%
2010	2,945		21.1%
2020	2,435		−17.3%

In the CDP, the population was spread out, with 41.1% under the age of 18, 10.7% from 18 to 24, 28.4% from 25 to 44, 15.4% from 45 to 64, and 4.4% who were 65 years of age or older. The median age was 24 years. For every 100 females, there were 104.8 males. For every 100 females age 18 and over, there were 101.5 males.

The median income for a household in the CDP was $29,886, and the median income for a family was $28,300. Males had a median income of $27,083 versus $20,897 for females. The per capita income for the CDP was $8,583. About 28.2% of families and 32.3% of the population were below the poverty line, including 37.9% of those under age 18 and 15.9% of those age 65 or over.

== See also ==
- The Museum at Warm Springs
