= Madras High School =

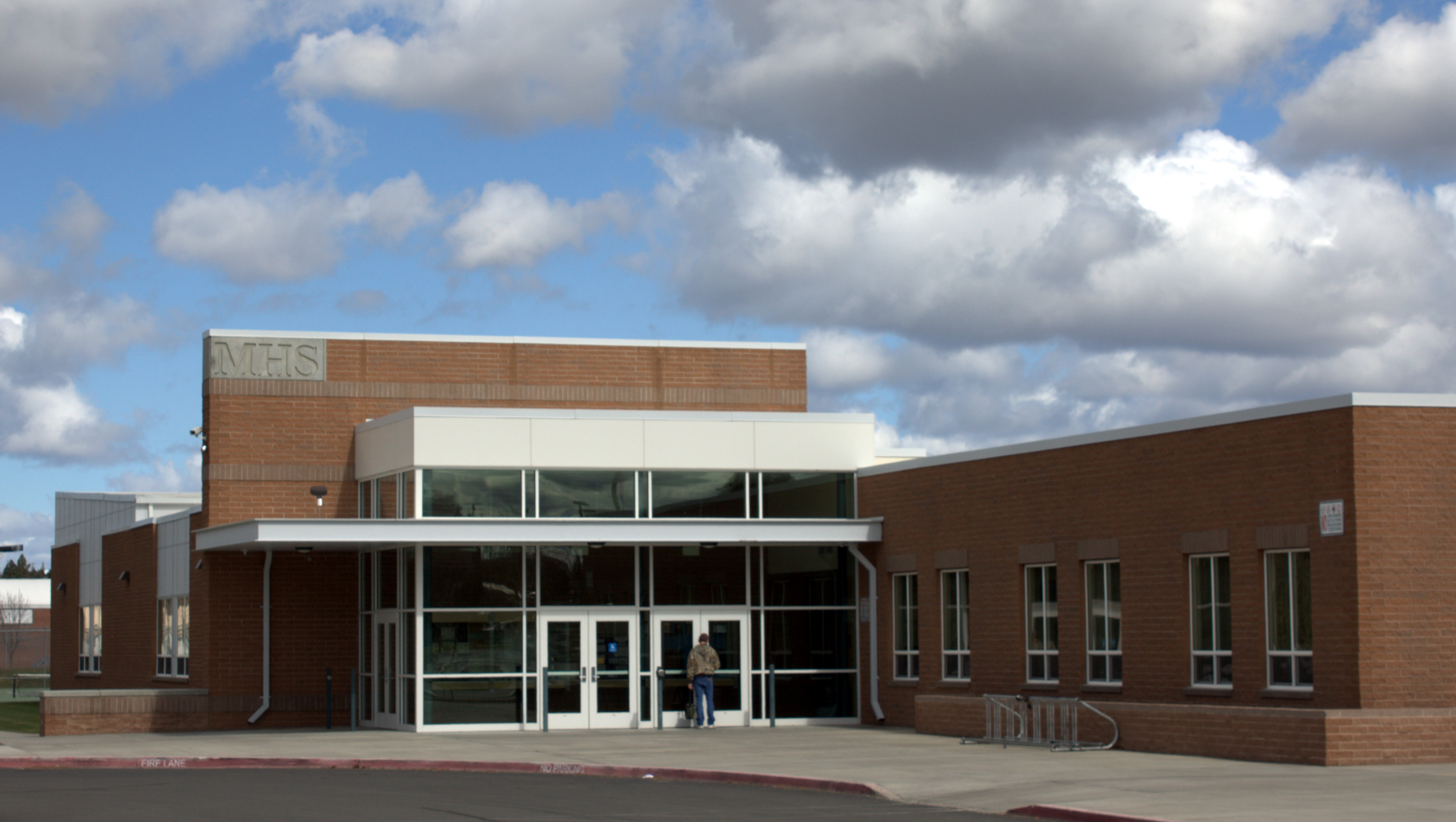

Location
- 390 SE 10th Street; Madras, (Jefferson County), Oregon 97741; United States
- Coordinates: 44.630318°N 121.123463°W

Information
- Type: Public high school
- School district: Jefferson County School District
- Principal: Tony Summers
- Teaching staff: 40.91 (FTE) (2018–19)
- Grades: 9–12
- Enrollment: 765 (2023-2024)
- Student to teacher ratio: 18.70
- Colors: Red, white, and blue
- Athletics conference: OSAA Tri-Valley Conference 4A-2
- Mascot: White Buffalo
- Website: www.jcsd.k12.or.us/schools/mhs/

Madras High School is a public high school in Madras, Oregon, United States.

== Academics ==
In 2008, 71% of the school's seniors received a high school diploma. Of 231 students, 165 graduated, 36 dropped out, three received a modified diploma, and 27 were still in high school the following year.

== Notable alumni ==
- Darrell Ceciliani, baseball outfielder for the Toronto Blue Jays
- Jacoby Ellsbury, baseball outfielder for the New York Yankees
- Pat Courtney Gold, fiber artist and basket weaver
- Andrew Fine, Local Farmer
