= Confederated Tribes of Warm Springs =

Indian tribe in Oregon, United States

Confederated Tribes of Warm Springs (Tenino, Wasco, Northern Paiute)
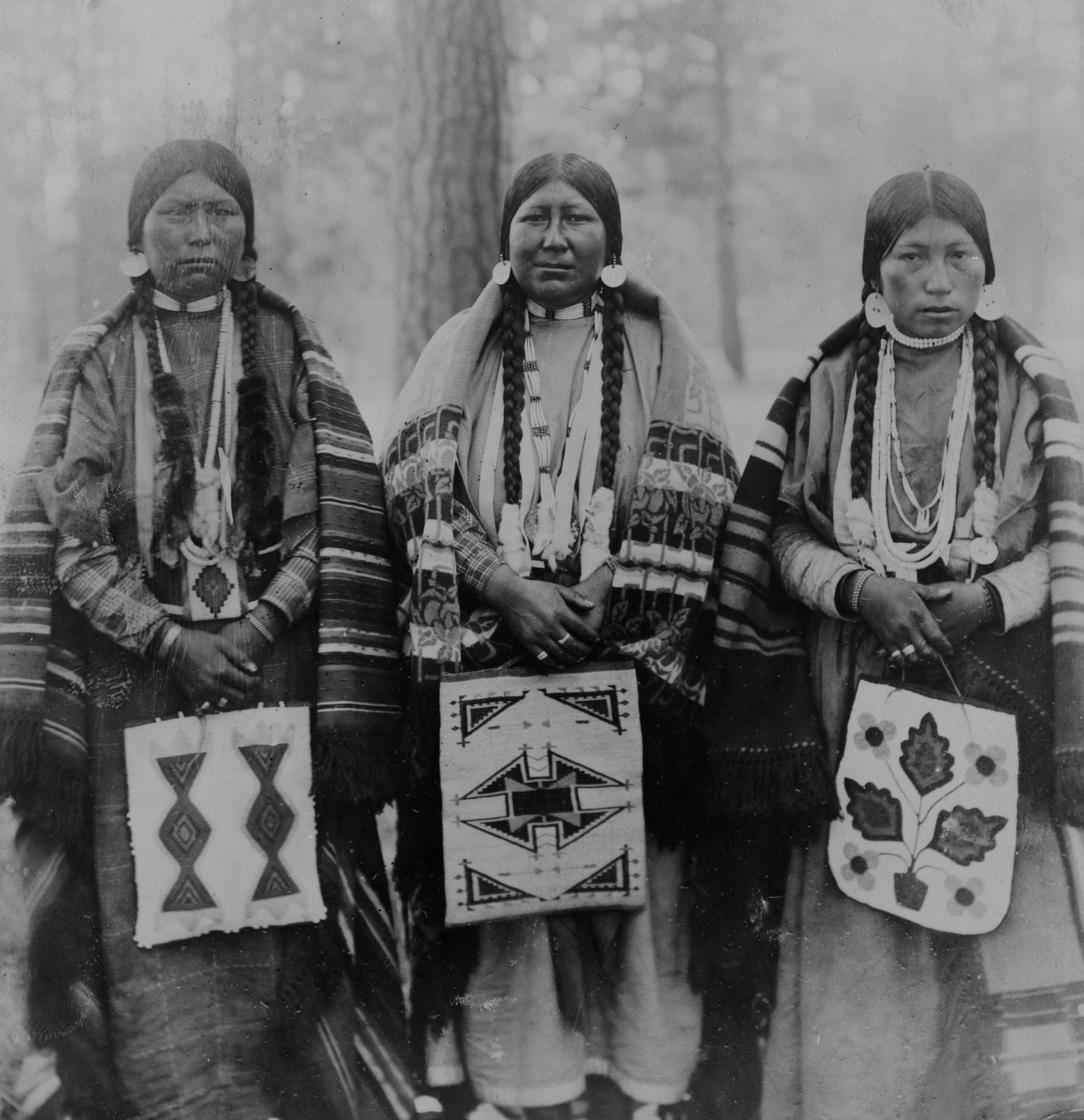
- Three women photographed on the Warm Springs reservation in 1902.

Regions with significant populations
- United States (Oregon)

The Confederated Tribes of Warm Springs is a federally recognized Native American tribe made of three tribes who put together a confederation. They live on and govern the Warm Springs Indian Reservation in the U.S. state of Oregon.

== Tribes ==
The confederation consists of three tribes of the Pacific Northwest:

- The Sahaptin-speaking Tenino people, divided into four subtribes: Upper and Lower Deschutes (the Tygh and the Wyam), the Dalles Tenino, and the Dock-Spus (John Day);
- Two bands (The Dalles a.k.a. the Ki-gal-twal-la, and Dog River) of Wasco Indians who spoke a dialect of Upper Chinook;
- The Northern Paiutes, who speak an offshoot of the Uto-Aztecan language family related to Shoshonean.

=== Wasco ===
==== Language ====
The Wasco language, known as Kiksht, has been passed down through generations of Warm Spring Tribe members. There is a concerted effort underway to try to preserve the ancestral language of the Wasco people, through educational programs and language repositories. The United States Governmental policy of assimilation (1790–1920) nearly erased this language. The young tribe members that attended governmental educational facilities were only permitted to speak English, and were forbidden to speak in their native tongue.

The loss of tribal elder Gladys Thompson in 2012 – who was the last fully fluent speaker of Kiksht – has caused the language to become nearly extinct. Language preservation efforts include the Central Oregon Community College 100‑level course in the Kiksht Native Language. The instructor for this course, Ms. Valerie Switzler, was the 2016 recipient of the Linguistic Society of America's Excellence in Community Linguistics Award. The Endangered Languages Archive at SOAS University of London has preserved recordings of conversational Kiksht.

=== Warm Springs ===
==== Bands ====
These bands are split into different places but are the part of the same tribe. The bands of the Warm Springs tribe consists of Tenino, the Lower Deschutes, also called Wyam, the John-Day or Dock-Spus, and finally the Upper Deschutes or Tygh.

==== Language ====
The Warm Springs band spoke a language called Sahaptin. Today there are only about 50 people who speak it fluently and none of them are under fifty years old.

=== Paiute ===
==== Paiute history ====
The Northern Paiutes had dominated South Eastern Oregon, Southern Idaho, Northern and Southern Nevada, and Northern California, with parts of Montana, and Utah.

==== Language ====
The Northern Paiutes' language is an Uto-Aztecan language called Numu, which had around 1600 speakers in 1999. It is closely related to the Mono language.

== History ==
=== Cultural origins ===
Before becoming the Confederated Tribes of Warm Springs the three tribes; Wasco, Warm Springs, and Paiute, lived along the Columbia River and Cascade Mountains. They all spoke different languages and had their own customs. The Warm Springs and Wasco tribes traded and conversed frequently, whereas the Paiute's language was so foreign to the other tribes that it prevented frequent contact.

=== Arrival of settlers from the U.S. ===
In 1800, immigrants from the east first started to arrive, by 1852 around 12,000 settlers crossed the tribes' territories each year. The Warm springs and Wasco signed a treaty with Joel Palmer in 1855 after dealing with their traditional ways of life being disrupted by the settlers for many years. By signing the treaty the Wasco and Warm Springs tribes relinquished 10 million acres of land to the United States and kept 640,000 acres for their own use.

The first people from the Paiute tribe to arrive on reservation were the 38 Paiutes that were forced to move onto the Warm Springs Reservation from the Yakama Reservation in 1879. Soon more arrived and they eventually became a permanent part of the Warm Springs Reservation.

=== Establishment of a confederation at Warm Springs ===
The Confederated Tribes adopted a constitution in 1938, after the construction of Bonneville Dam flooded the major fishing site at Cascades Rapids. Upon receiving a $4 million settlement in compensation for the 1957 flooding of Celilo Falls by the construction of The Dalles Dam, the Tribes used part of the sum to build the Kah-Nee-Ta resort, which opened in 1964.

=== Political action ===
In 2001, members of the Confederated Tribes persuaded the Oregon Legislative Assembly to pass a bill mandating that the word squaw be changed in numerous place names.

== Notable tribal citizens ==
- Elizabeth Woody, artist, poet, educator, and director of the Museum at Warm Springs

== See also ==
- List of Native American Tribal Entities in Oregon
- Kah-Nee-Ta High Desert Resort and Casino, a resort on the Warm Springs Reservation
- Columbia Gorge casino, the Confederated Tribes' proposed casino in the Columbia River Gorge
