= Elizabeth Woody =

Native American artist and museum director from Oregon, U.S.

- Born: 1959 (age 66–67); Ganado, Arizona
- Citizenship: Confederated Tribes of the Warm Springs Reservation and American
- Education: Bachelor's: Evergreen State College, Master's: Portland State University
- Occupations: artist, poet, educator, museum director
- Employer: Museum at Warm Springs
- Title: Executive Director
- Board member of: Soapstone, Inc.
- Relatives: Lillian Pitt (aunt)
- Awards: poet laureate of Oregon (2016)
- Website: elizabethwoodyarts.com

Elizabeth Woody (born 1959) is a Native American artist, poet, educator, and museum professional. She is an enrolled citizen of the Confederated Tribes of the Warm Springs Reservation and a Wasco, Yakama, and Navajo descendant.

In 2016, she was the first Native American to be named poet laureate of Oregon by Governor Kate Brown.

== Early life and education ==
Elizabeth Woody was born in Ganado, Arizona, in 1959. She is born for Tódích'íinii (Bitter Water clan). Her maternal grandmother belongs to the Milee-thlama (People of the Hot Springs) and Wyampum peoples (People of the Echo of Water Upon Rocks). Her maternal grandfather's people were the middle Columbia River Chinook peoples.

After studying at the Institute of American Indian Arts in Santa Fe, New Mexico, from 1980 to 1983, she earned a bachelor's degree in humanities with an emphasis in English from Evergreen State College in Olympia, Washington. In 2012, she received a Master of Public Administration Degree through the Executive Leadership Institute of the Mark O. Hatfield School of Government, Portland State University in Portland, Oregon.

== Writing ==
In 1992, she was an invited writer at the Returning the Gift Festival of Native Writers and a featured poet at the Geraldine R. Dodge Poetry Festival. James Welch, editor of the spring 1994 issue Ploughshares, includes her poetry that journal.

From 1994 to 1996, Woody taught creative writing at IAIA. She has worked in various programs teaching workshops, mentoring, as a consultant, and lectures throughout the country. Woody has worked with the Telluride Native Writer's Forum, reading, panels, and workshops for Northwest Wordcraft Circle, Neah Bay, Washington; and Newport, Oregon; Southwest Native American High School Students, Telluride, CO; Young Writer's Conference and Performance, readings, illustration, poetry, and short story workshops for Northwest Native American high school writers at Paschal Sherman Indian School, Omak, Washington; Grey Hills Academy Diné Fine Arts and Drama Festival, Tuba City, Arizona; and Flight of the Mind Writing Workshops for Women, McKenzie Bridge, Oregon.

== Visual arts ==
As an artist, Woody has exhibited regionally and nationally. She participated in the Pacific Rim Gathering that culminated in a touring exhibition in Hité'emlkiliiksix, "Within the Circle of the Rim: Nations Gathering on Common Ground". She has shown in "Submuloc Wohs/Columbus Show" and "For the Seventh Generation: Native American Artists Counter the Quincentenary", Columbus, New York. Both exhibitions toured.

== Community service ==
In Oregon, Woody served on the Northwest Native American Arts Services Task Force, sponsored by the Eastern Oregon Regional Arts Council, and was one of the founding members of the Northwest Native American Writers Association. She was selected to be an apprentice in the Oregon Folk Arts Master-Apprenticeship, to learn traditional basket weaving from Margaret Jim-Pennah. Woody has also served as a juror for their program for two years, and has served on multi-disciplinary art fellowship jury panels for several arts organizations in the Pacific Northwest.

Woody is a board member of Soapstone, Inc., a women writer's retreat. She served on the original Willamette University Advisory Council for Native Programs located in Salem, Oregon, and served as founding secretary on the founding board of the Native Arts and Cultures Foundation endowed by the Ford Foundation. She also served on the inaugural advisory board for Lewis and Clark College Graduate School of Education and Counseling conference, "Indigenous Ways of Knowing", and as a leadership circle advisor for the Ford Foundation's feasibility study on a national Native American arts and culture fund.

In 2005, Woody was approved by resolution to serve on the steering committee for the Affiliated Tribes of Northwest Indians proposed Northwest Tribes Indian Policy Center. She also advises the Evergreen State College Native Arts Council who hosts a Native American Arts Fair at the Washington State History Museum.

She formerly worked as Director of the Indigenous Leadership Program at the non-profit environmental organization, Ecotrust of Portland, Oregon for the Ecotrust Indigenous Leadership Award. After twelve years of service, and seven years of developing the program, Elizabeth moved to the "National Science Foundation's Center for Coastal Margin Observation and Prediction located at Oregon Health and Science University.

She worked as the K-12 Program Coordinator for three years. She is a program officer at the Meyer Memorial Trust located in Portland, Oregon.

== Awards ==
Woody received an American Book Award in 1990 for her book Hand into Stone from the Before Columbus Foundation. This book has been republished, including new prose and poetry, as Seven Hands Seven Hearts. In 1993 she received a Medicine Pathways for the Future Fellowship/Kellogg Fellowship from the American Indian Ambassadors Program of the Americans for Indian Opportunity. She is a recipient of the William Stafford Memorial Award for Poetry from the Pacific Northwest Booksellers Association and was a finalist in the Oregon Book Awards in poetry for Luminaries of the Humble in 1995. She held a Brandywine Visiting Artist Fellowship in 1986, and in 1997 she was awarded a J.T. Stewart Award and Fellowship by Hedgebrook, a retreat for women writers on Whidbey Island, Washington. In May 1997, she participated in a residency sponsored by Intersection for the Arts in San Francisco, California. The governor named her Poet Laureate of Oregon starting April 2016 for two years.

== Books by Elizabeth Woody ==
=== Poetry ===
- Luminaries of the Humble, (Sun Tracks, Vol 30), University of Arizona Press.
  - Review by Judy Elsley in Weber Studies
- Seven Hands Seven Hearts, Eighth Mountain Press.
- Hand into Stone: Poems, Contact II Publications.
  - Reviewed by Joy Harjo in Calyx, 12, no. 3 (1990): 95–97
  - Reviewed in Mid-American Review, XI, 1, Fall 1990.
- Old Shirts & New Skins Elizabeth illustrated this book of Sherman Alexie poems.

=== Anthologies ===
- Renewing Salmon Nation's Food Traditions, Gary Paul Nabhan (Editor), Ecotrust, Portland, OR. 2006.
- River of Memory: The Everlasting Columbia, William D. Layman (editor), Washington Univ. Pr.
- A Song to the Creator: Traditional Arts of Native American Women of the Plateau, Lillian A. Ackerman (Editor), Univ. Oklahoma Press.
- Oregon Salmon: Essay on the State of the Fish at the Turn of the Millennium. Essay, Oregon Trout, Portland, OR, 2001
- Salmon Nation, Edward C. Wolf and Seth Zuckerman, Ecotrust. Portland, OR. 1999.
  - Publisher's page
- When the Rain Sings: Poems by Young Native Americans, Lee Francis (Editor), Simon & Schuster.
- Dreaming the Dawn: Conversations With Native Artists and Activists, E. K. Caldwell, University of Nebraska Press.
- First Fish, First People: Salmon Tales of the North Pacific, Judith Roche and Meg McHutchison (Editors), University of Washington Press.
- Speaking for the Generations: Native Writers on Writing (Sun Tracks Books), University of Arizona Press.
- Intimate Nature: The Bond Between Women and Animals, Linda Hogan, Deena Metzger, Brenda Peterson (Editors), Ballantine & Random House
- Earth, Wind, and Fire: Harry Fonseca, Jonathan Batkin (Editor), Wheelwright Museum, Santa Fe.
- Native American Art in the Twentieth Century: Makers, Meanings, Histories, Jackson Rushing (Editor), Routledge LTD.
- The Writer's Journal: 40 Contemporary Authors and Their Journals, Sheila Bender (Editor), Delta.
- Reinventing the Enemy's Language: Contemporary Native Women's Writing of North America, Joy Harjo and Gloria Bird (editors), W.W. Norton.
- Durable Breath: Contemporary Native American Poetry, John E. Smelcer, D. L. Birchfield (Editors), Salmon Run Press
- A Gathering of Spirit: A Collection by North American Indian Women, Beth Brant (Editor), Firebrand Books.
- Home Places: Contemporary Native American Writing from Sun Tracks (Sun Tracks, Vol 31), Larry Evers, Ofelia Zepeda (Editors), University of Arizona Press.
- Dancing on the Rim of the World : An Anthology of Contemporary Northwest Native American Writing (Sun Tracks, Vol 19), Andrea Lerner (Editor), University of Arizona Press.
- Returning the Gift: Poetry and Prose from the First North American Native Writers' Festival, (Sun Tracks Books, No 29) University of Arizona Press.
- The World begins Here: Oregon Short Fiction, (Oregon Literature Series, Vol 1), Glen A. Love (Editor), Oregon State University Press.
- Varieties of Hope: An Anthology of Oregon Prose, (Oregon Literature Series, Vol 3), Gordon B. Dodds (Editor), Oregon State University Press.
- From Here We Speak: An Anthology of Oregon Poetry (Oregon Literature Series; V. 4), Ingrid Wendt, Primus St. John (Editors), Oregon State University Press.
- The Stories We Tell: An Anthology of Oregon Folk Literature (Oregon Literature Series Vol. 5), Suzi Jones, Jarold Ramsey (Editors), Oregon State University Press.
- A Circle of Nations: Voices and Visions of American Indians, John Gattuso (Editor), Beyond Words Publishing Co.
- We, the human beings: 27 contemporary native American artists, Wooster Art Museum.
- Talking Leaves: Contemporary Native American Short Stories, Craig Lesley, Katheryn Stavrakis (Editor) Dell Books
- The Clouds Threw This Light, Phillip Foss (Editor), Institute of American Indian Arts Press.
- Songs from This Earth on Turtle's Back: An Anthology of Poetry by American Indian Writers, Joseph Bruchac (Editor), Greenfield Review Press

=== Interviews and critical essays ===
- The Nature of Native American Poetry, Norma C. Wilson, Univ. New Mexico Press.
- Here First, Brian Swann, Arnold Krupat (Editors), Random House.
- "Contrary Iconography", Jackson Rushing, New Art Examiner, Summer 1994.
- "The Earth is Richer for this Voice", Interview by Kim Caldwell in Raven's Chronicles, Winter 93–94.

=== Biographical information ===
- Notable Native Americans, Sharon Malinowski & George H.J. Abrams (Editors), Gale Research.
- The Biographical Directory of Native American Painters, Patrick D. Lester, University of Oklahoma Press.
- St. James Guide to Native North American Artists, Roger Matuz (Editor), Gale Research.
- Contemporary Authors: A Bio-Bibliographical Guide to Current Writers in Fiction, General Nonfiction, Poetry, Journalism, Drama, Motion Pictures, Television, Volume 135, Susan M. Trosky (Editor), Gale Research.

=== Videos ===
- Salmon: Why Bother?, from Sea Grant
- Faithful to Continuance, from Mimbres Fever Productions

=== Work published in translation ===
- Les Cahiers- de poesie recontre, 25 special, La poesie Amerindienne, May 1989, Manuel Van Theinen (Editor), France.
- Elenco Racconti Raccolta Scrittrici Indianoamericane, Laura Coltelli, Dr. Cinzia Biagotti (Editors), Giunti Gruppo Editoriale, Publisher, Firenze, Italy.
