= Warm Springs Indian Reservation =

American reserve in Oregon, US

- Indian reservation
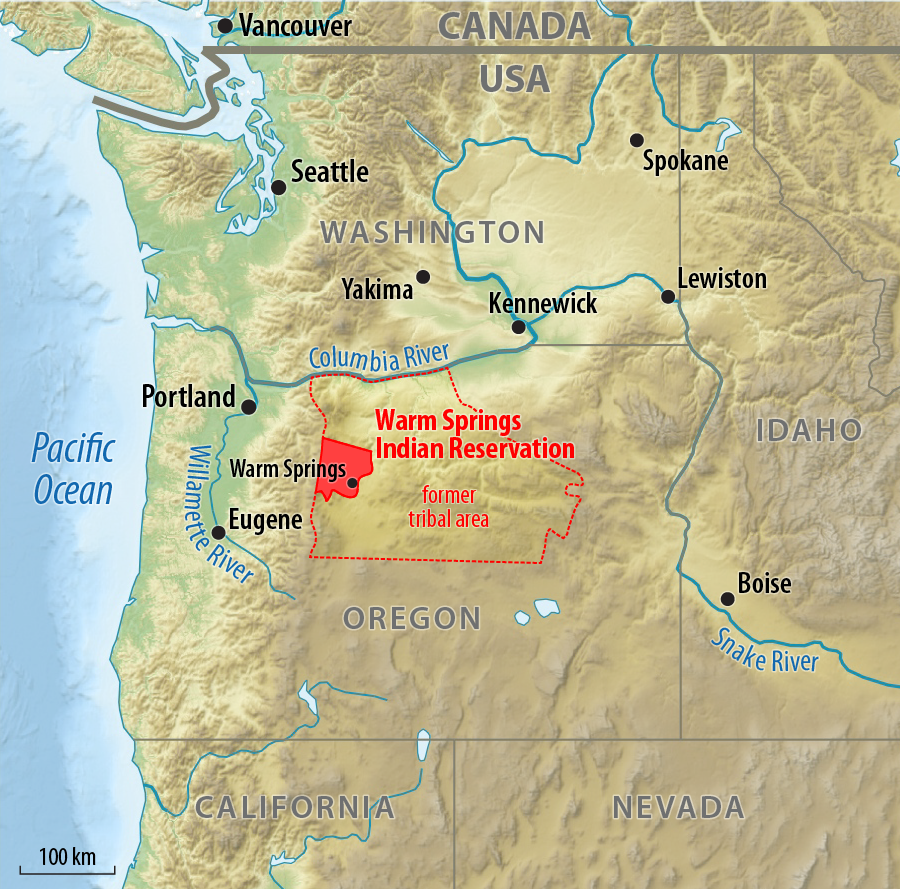
- Location of the Warm Springs Indian Reservation and former tribal area
- Coordinates: 44°52′12″N 121°27′14″W
- Tribe: Confederated Tribes of Warm Springs
- Country: United States
- State: Oregon

Area
  - Total: 2,640 km^{2} (1,019 sq mi)
- Website: Official website

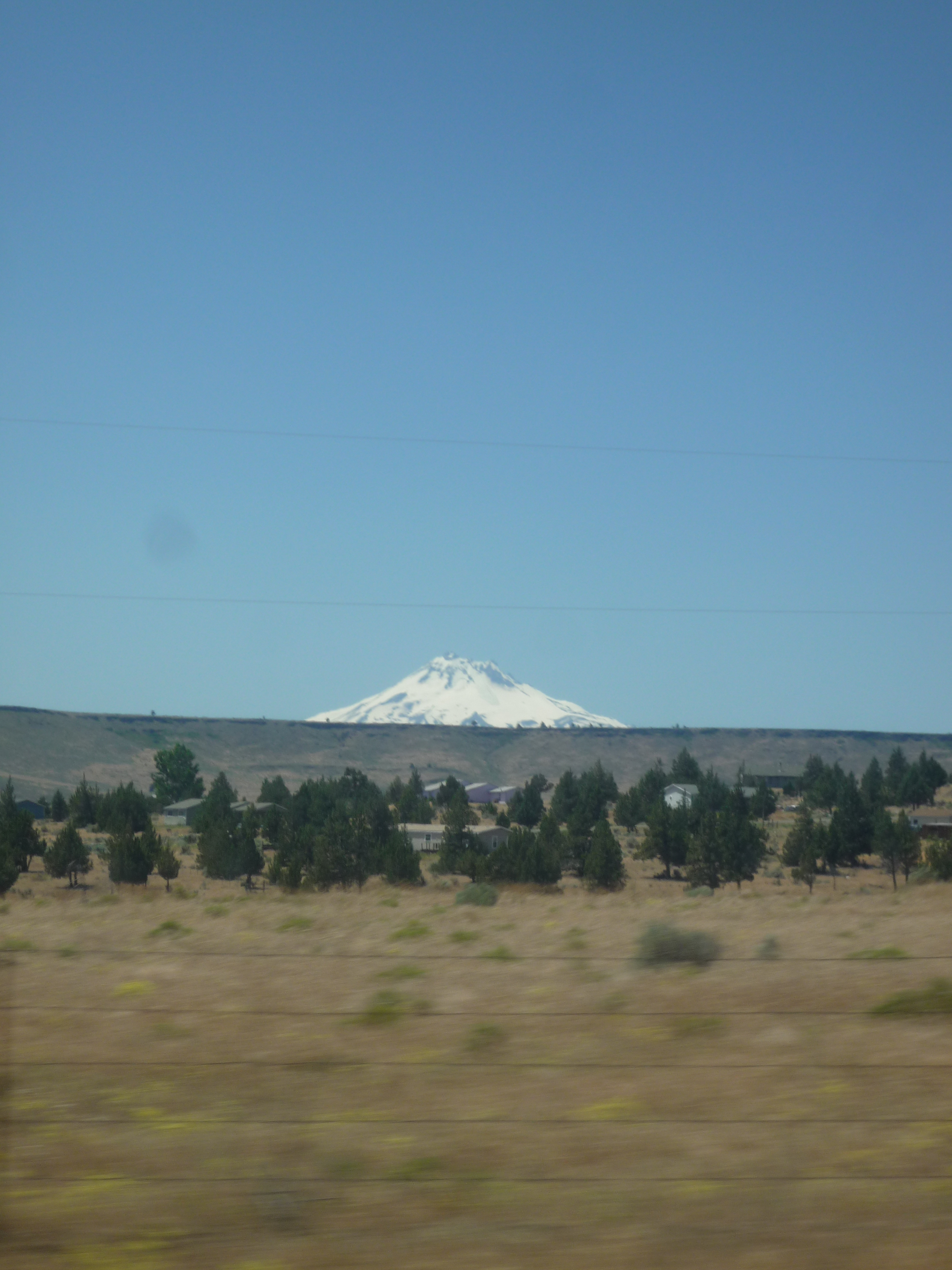
The high desert in the Warm Springs Indian Reservation with Mount Jefferson in the background

The Warm Springs Indian Reservation consists of 1,019 square miles (2,640 km^{2}) in north-central Oregon, in the United States, and is governed by the Confederated Tribes of Warm Springs.

== Tribes ==
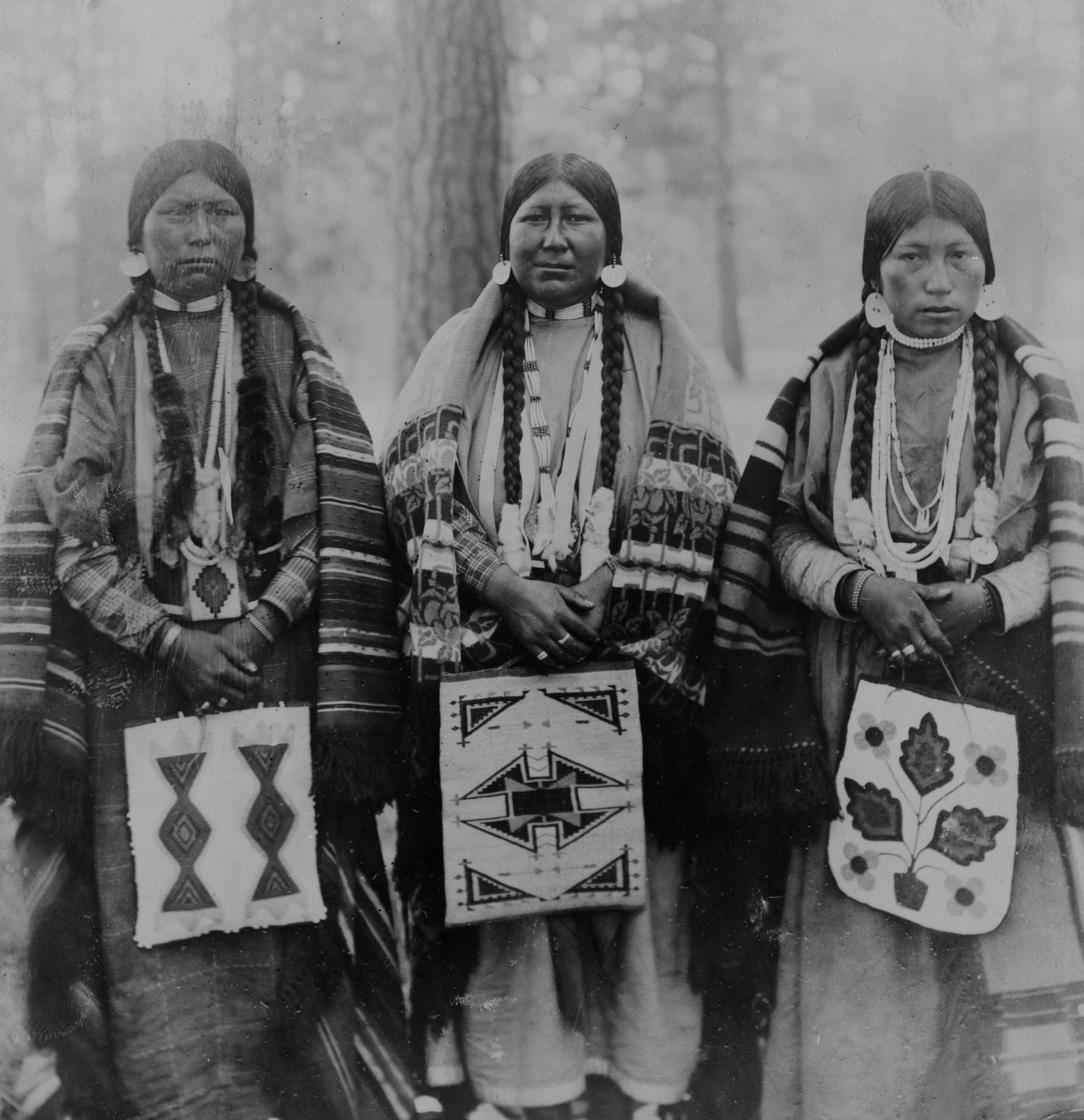
Three women photographed on the reservation in 1902

Three tribes form the confederation: the Wasco, Tenino, and Northern Paiute. Since 1938 they have been unified as the Confederated Tribes of Warm Springs.

== History ==
The reservation was created by treaty in 1855, which defined its boundaries as follows:

Commencing in the middle of the channel of the Deschutes River opposite the eastern termination of a range of high lands usually known as the Mutton Mountains; thence westerly to the summit of said range, along the divide to its connection with the Cascade Mountains; thence to the summit of said mountains; thence southerly to Mount Jefferson; thence down the main branch of Deschutes River; heading in this peak, to its junction with Deschutes River; and thence down the middle of the channel of said river to the place of beginning.

The Warm Springs and Wasco bands gave up ownership rights to a 10,000,000-acre (40,000 km^{2}) area, which they had inhabited for over 10,000 years, in exchange for basic health care, education, and other forms of assistance as outlined by the Treaty with the Tribes of Middle Oregon (June 25, 1855). Other provisions of the Treaty of 1855 ensured that tribal members retained hunting and fishing rights in the "Natural and Accustomed Area" which they had vacated. These treaty hunting and fishing rights are rights that were retained by the tribe and are not "special rights" granted by the U.S. government.

In 1879, the U.S. government moved about 38 Paiutes to the reservation and around 70 more in 1884, despite that tribe's history of conflict with Columbia River tribes.

The borders of the reservation were under dispute for 101 years, during what became known as the McQuinn Strip boundary dispute. In 1871, a surveyor named T.B. Handley measured the land, determining that it was smaller than outlined in the treaty of 1855. The Warms Spring people objected and, in 1887, a surveyor named John A. McQuinn determined that they were correct; Handley had incorrectly measured the reservation's boundaries. By this time, settlers had moved onto the disputed land. The government offered the Warm Springs people a cash settlement for the land, but the Warms Springs people refused it. In 1972, Public Law 92-427 restored the land to the Warm Springs people.

== Geography ==
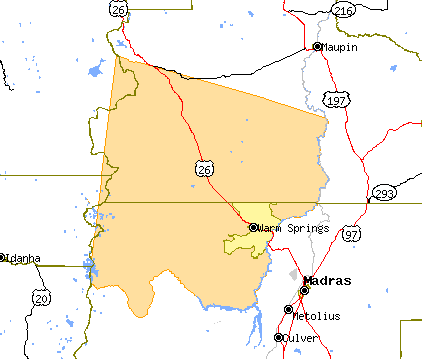
Map of the Warm Springs Indian Reservation

The reservation lies primarily in parts of Wasco County and Jefferson County, but there are smaller sections in six other counties; in descending order of land area they are: Clackamas, Marion, Gilliam, Sherman, Linn and Hood River counties. (The Gilliam, Sherman, and Hood River County portions consist of sections of non-contiguous off-reservation trust land along the lower John Day River and one of its tributaries, Hay Creek, along with two small parcels immediately east of Hood River.) The reservation is 105 miles (169 km) southeast of Portland; 348,000 acres (1,410 km^{2}), over half, is forested.

== Government ==
The government of the Warm Springs Indian Reservation is handled by the Confederated Tribes of Warm Springs. There is a tribal police department.

== Demographics ==
Its 2000 census total population was 3,314 inhabitants.

The reservations's only significant population center is the community of Warm Springs (also known as the Warm Springs Agency), which comprises over 73 percent of the reservation's population. As of 2003, the reservation was home to a tribal enrollment of over 4,200.

== Culture ==
The Warm Springs Reservation is one of the last holdouts in the U.S. of speakers of the Chinook Jargon because of its utility as an intertribal language. The forms of the Jargon used by elders in Warm Springs vary considerably from the heavily creolized form at Grand Ronde.

Kiksht, Numu and Ichishkiin Snwit languages are taught in the Warm Springs Reservation schools.

The Museum at Warm Springs houses a large collection of North American Indian artifacts. It was opened in 1993.

== Economy ==
The biggest source of revenue for the tribes is hydroelectric (Warm Springs Power Enterprises) projects on the Deschutes River. The tribes also operate Warm Springs Forest Products Industries.

Many tribal members engage in ceremonial, subsistence, and commercial fisheries in the Columbia River for salmon, steelhead, and sturgeon. The Columbia Basin Initiative aims to improve salmon-fishing for the tribe. Tribal members also fish for salmon and steelhead for subsistence purposes in the Deschutes River, primarily at Sherars Falls. Tribal members also harvest Pacific lamprey at Sherars Falls and Willamette Falls. The tribe's fishing rights are protected by treaty and re-affirmed by court cases such as Sohappy v. Smith and United States v. Oregon.

=== Tourism ===
In 1964, the first part of the Kah-nee-ta resort was completed – Kah-nee-ta Village – a lodging complex with a motel, cottages, and tipis. The resort eventually included a lodge, casino, convention center, and golf course. Due to lack of rentability, the resort was closed in September 2018.

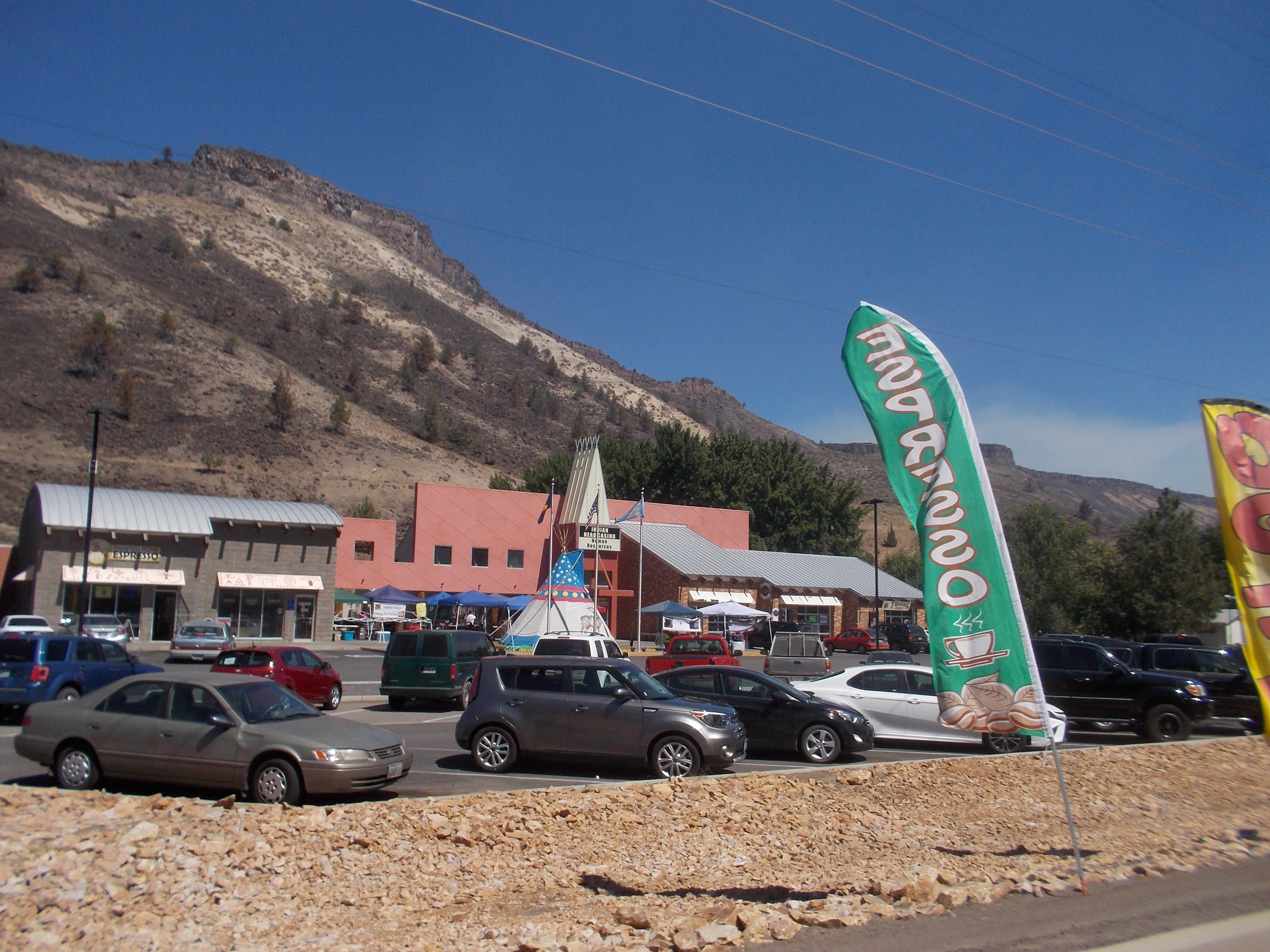
The Indian Head Casino

The Indian Head Casino on U.S. Route 26 opened in February 2012. It has 18,000 square feet (1,700 m^{2}) of gaming space, with 500 slot machines and 8 blackjack tables. The tribes expect the casino to net $9 to 12 million annually. The casino previously operated at Kah-Nee-Ta, where it had only 300 slot machines and made $2 to 4 million a year. The new location was intended to be more accessible to travelers, since Kah-Nee-Ta is located about a half an hour from Highway 26.

=== Other business ventures ===
In 2016, the tribe's lumber mill, also located on Highway 26 near the village of Warm Springs, shut down. It had been operating for decades but output had declined in recent years. One solution proposed by a tribal entity, Warm Springs Ventures, to create new revenue and jobs for the tribe was the launch of three new business ventures: cannabis cultivation, extraction and distribution; drone training, certification and manufacture; and a carbon offset venture that would sell carbon offsets to major polluters. All three ventures were expected to be operating sometime in 2017. The tribe was awarded the right by the Federal Aviation Administration to certify drone operators in 2016. The cannabis project was approved by a vote of tribal members but as of October 2016 still faced administrative and funding challenges.

== Ecology ==
Biologists of the Confederated Tribe of the Warm Springs have assisted the Oregon Department of Fish and Wildlife in tracking the repopulation of wolves in Oregon. Wolves are dispersing into territory where they have not lived for decades including the northern Cascades region. The biologists fitted a young wolf with a radio collar in June 2020; by February 2021, the two-year-old male had left his White River pack and became the 16th documented gray wolf in the repopulation of wolves in California when he reached Mono County, east of Yosemite National Park in the central Sierra Nevada. Two adult wolves were found on the reservation in December 2021 by the biologists and two pups were caught on a trail camera in August 2022. These resident wolves brought the total number of known wolf groups in the region to three.

== Infrastructure ==
Water from the Deschutes River goes through a treatment facility and serves around 3,800 people.

== Gallery ==
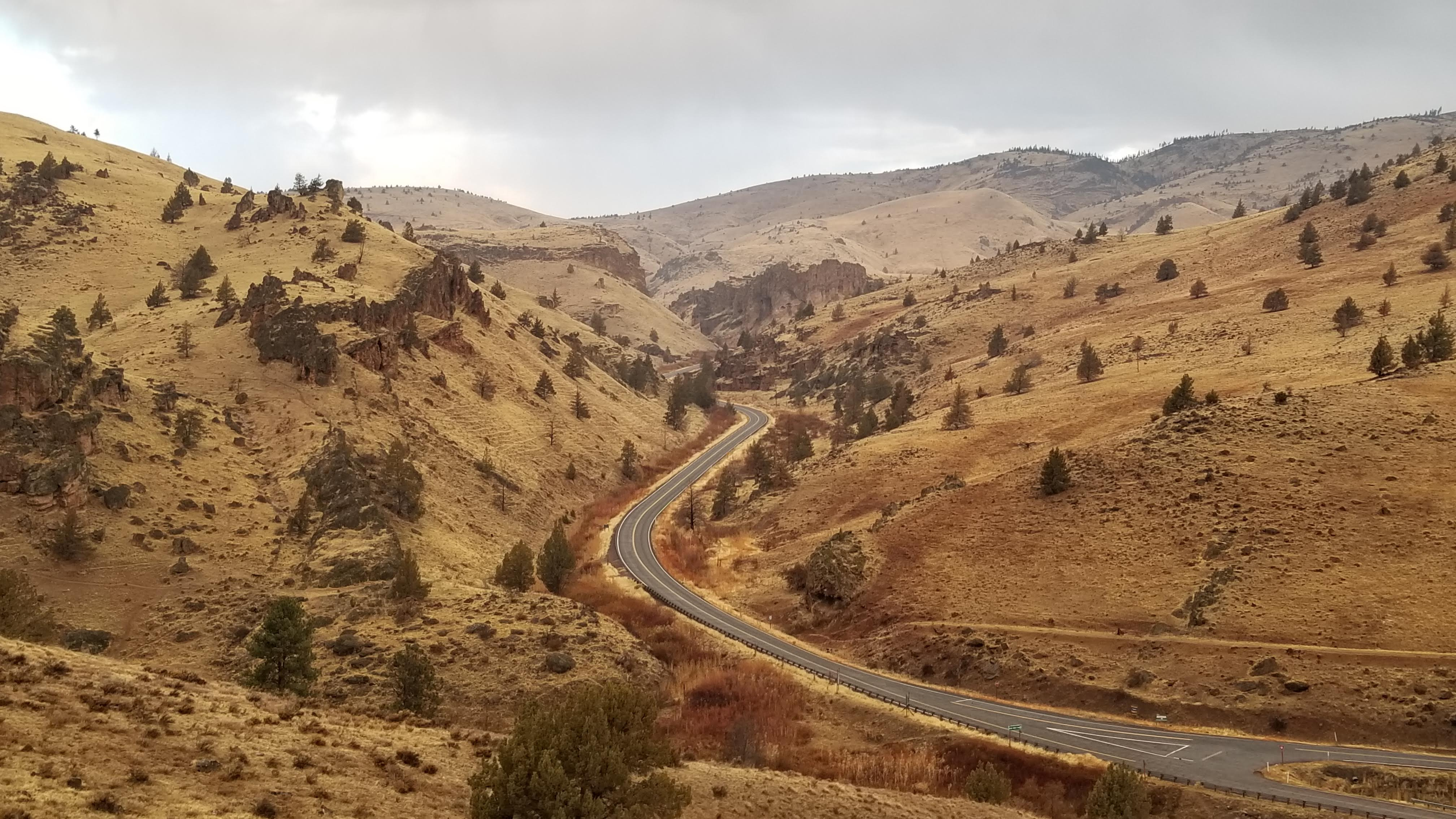
View of a road in the Warm Springs Reservation

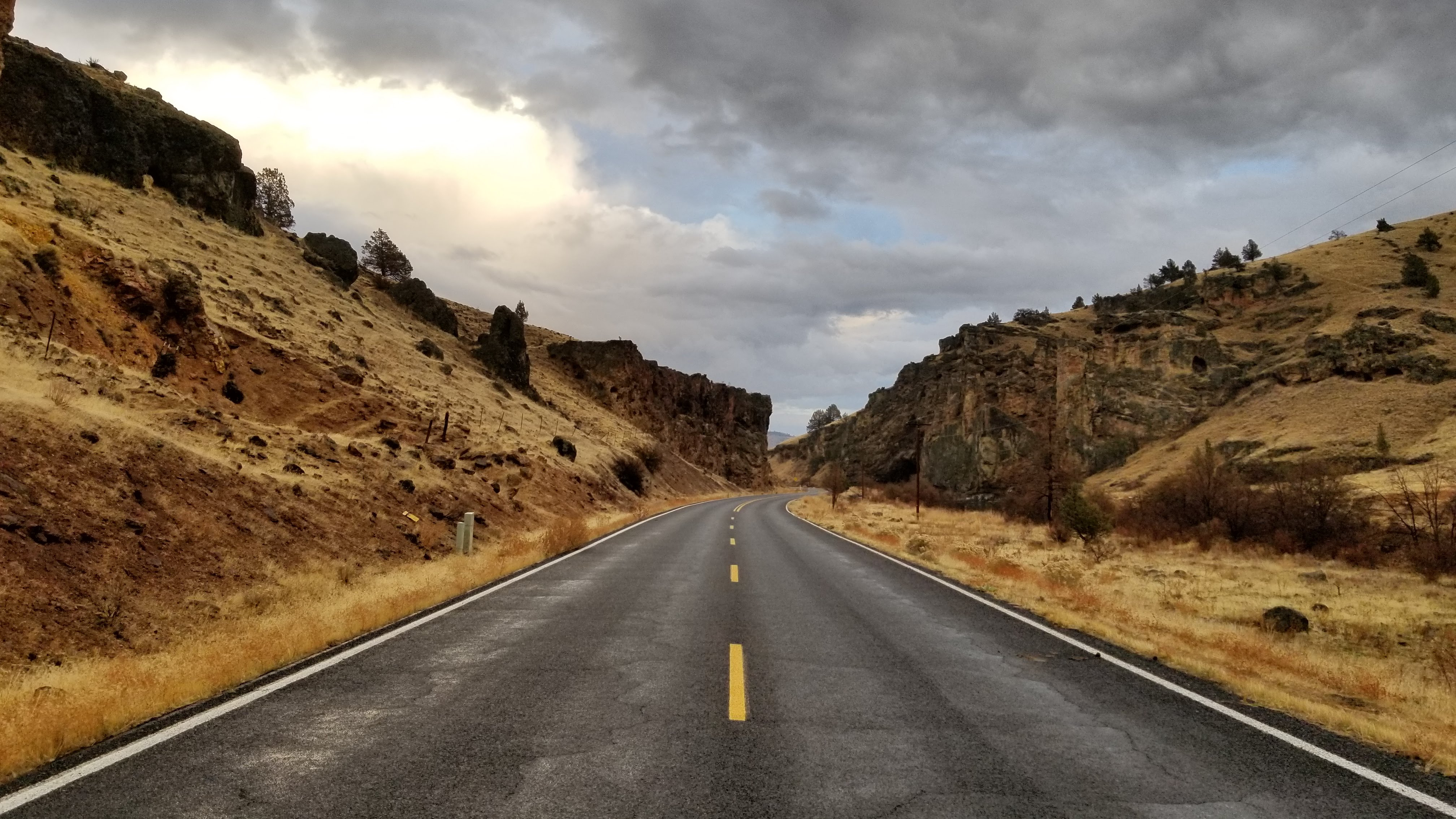
Road to the now-closed Kah-Nee-Ta Resort

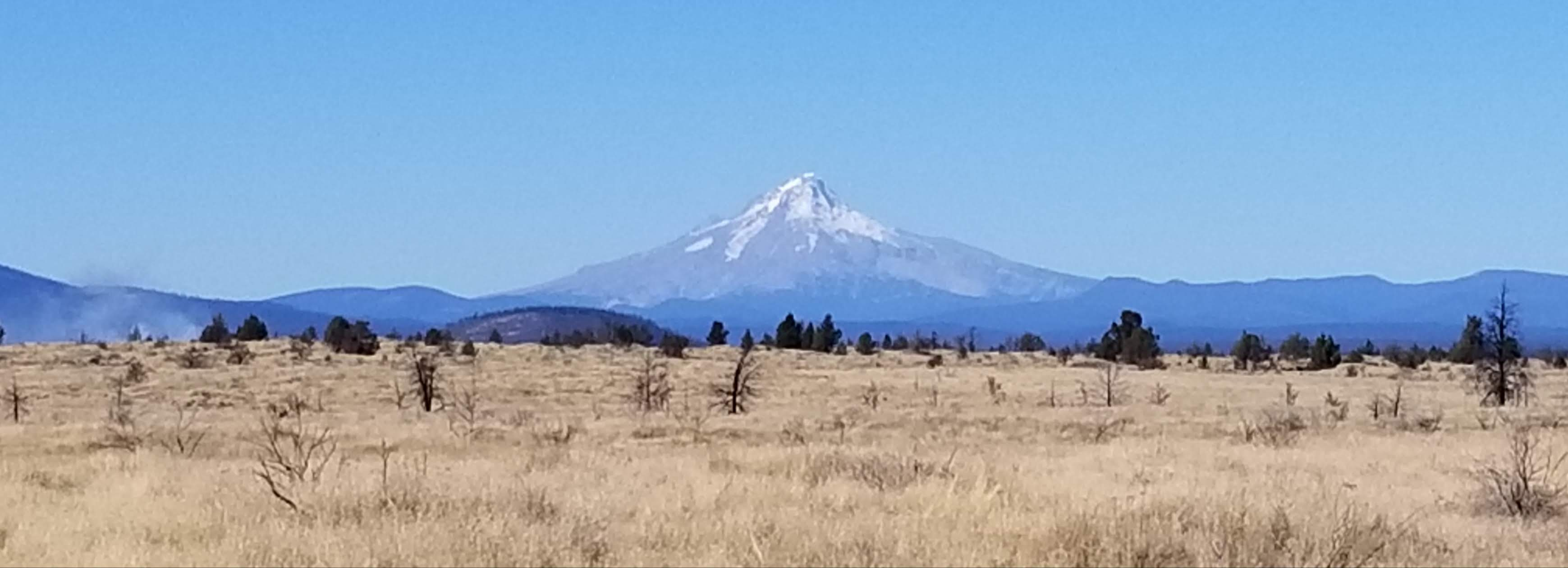
Mount Hood (as seen from the reservation)

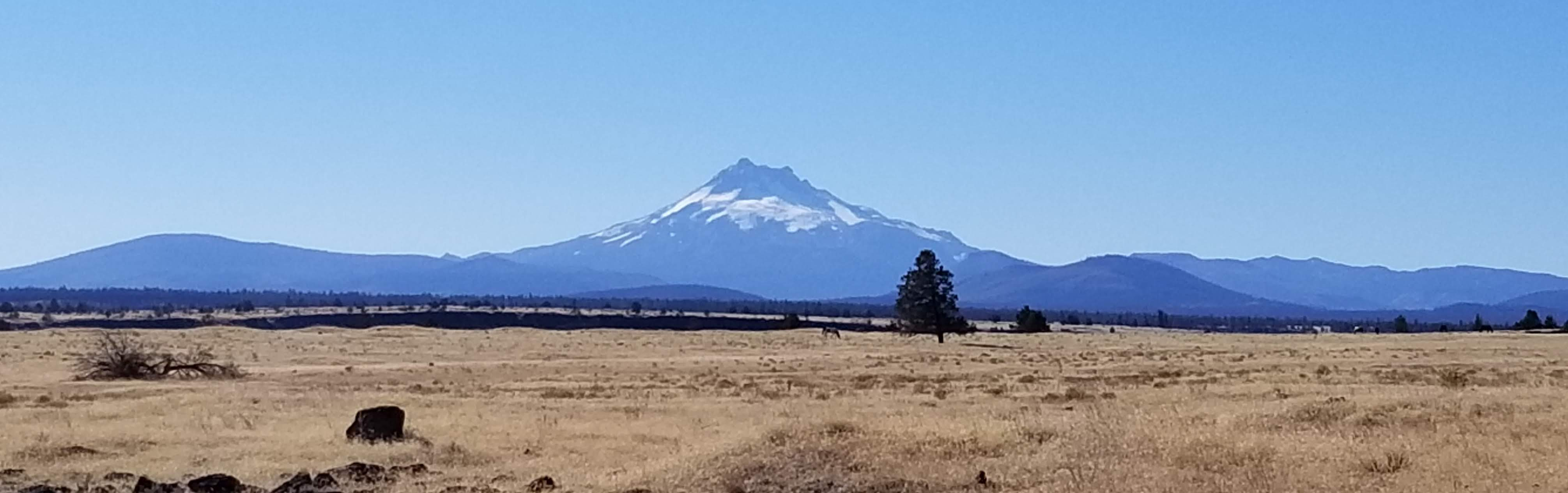
Mount Jefferson (as seen from the reservation)
