= Umatilla language =

Southern Sahaptin language of the US

Umatilla
- Tamalúut, Imatalamłaamí Sɨ́nwit
- Native to: United States
- Region: Oregon, Washington
- Ethnicity: Umatilla
- Native speakers: 25 (2007)
- Language family: Penutian ?: Plateau Penutian; Sahaptian; Sahaptin; Southern; Umatilla

Language codes
- ISO 639-3: uma
- Glottolog: umat1237

Umatilla /ˌjuːməˈtɪlə/ (Tamalúut or Imatalamłaamí Sɨ́nwit) is a variety of Southern Sahaptin, part of the Sahaptian subfamily of the Plateau Penutian group. It was spoken during late aboriginal times along the Columbia River and is therefore also called Columbia River Sahaptin. It is currently spoken as a first language by a few dozen elders and some adults in the Umatilla Reservation in Oregon. Some sources say that Umatilla is derived from imatilám-hlama: hlama means 'those living at' or 'people of' and there is an ongoing debate about the meaning of imatilám, but it is said to be an island in the Columbia River. B. Rigsby and N. Rude mention the village of ímatalam that was situated at the mouth of the Umatilla River and where the language was spoken.

The Umatillas pronounce the word ímatalam. A Umatilla person is called imatalamłá (with orthographic ł representing IPA /ɬ/) and the Umatilla people are called imatalamłáma. The Nez Perce refer to the Umatilla people as hiyówatalampoo. See Aoki (1994:171).

== Use and revitalization efforts ==
As of 2013, there are about 50 first language speakers of Umatilla. The language is taught at the Nixyaawii Community School. "There are six full-time language instructors in CTUIR (Confederated Tribes of the Umatilla Indian Reservation). Nixyaawii Community School has offered Umatilla, Walla Walla and Nez Perce language classes for the last decade and a Cay-Uma-Wa Head Start program is being developed to reach children while they’re young. There are also online video resources and the Tamaluut immersion school, a new language immersion program for three- to five-year-olds." The Wíyat'ish Naknúwit "For the Future" Language Project, has trained speakers using a Master-Apprentice program. A Flash Story Camp has been held by First Nations Development in collaboration with Tamastslikt's Language Enhancement Program and Education Department, and the Confederated Tribes of the Umatilla Indian Reservation. In 2015, Umatilla instruction will be given at the high school level. There is interest in adapting a curriculum for Umatilla that has been used successfully for Okanagan Salish at the Salish School of Spokane.

The Umatilla Dictionary was published in 2014 with the University of Washington Press. The Dictionary documents the language of the Umatilla people east of the Cascade Mountains in Oregon and Washington. Working for many years with the accumulated scholarship of linguists and anthropologists as well as with elders on the Umatilla Reservation, tribal linguist Noel Rude has painstakingly recorded words, pronunciations, phrases, and other elements of the Umatilla language. The dictionary includes a grammar and comparative information that places the Umatilla language in its linguistic and historical context and compiles all of its known words, phrases, and constructions. Umatilla Dictionary is an important work for people of the Confederated Tribes of the Umatilla Indian Reservation, the Yakama Nation, and the Confederated Tribes of Warm Springs and adds to the growing linguistic work being done by tribes and scholars on endangered languages.

== Phonology ==
Rigsby and Rude use a technical alphabet based upon the Americanist phonetic notation to transcribe Umatilla, though other practical orthographies also exist.

=== Vowels ===
	Front		Central		Back	
	short	long	short	long	short	long
Close	i	iː	ɨ		u	uː
Open			a	aː		

All long vowels are written as clusters of identical short vowels.

- The pronunciation of /a/ ranges from [ɑ] to [ʌ] and it shifts to [a] or [ɛ] when preceded or followed by /j/.
- The pronunciation of /aː/ ranges from [aː] to [ɑː].
- The pronunciation of /i/ ranges from [ɪ] to [i] and it shifts to [e] near /q qʼ x̣/.
- /iː/ has a schwa-like offglide before uvulars and it shifts to [e] after uvulars.
- /ɨ/ is pronounced [ɨ], and may lower dialectally to [ə] or [a].
- /u/ is pronounced [u] and it shifts to [o] near uvulars.
- /uː/ is pronounced [uː] and it shifts to [o] near uvulars.

Vowels of different quality never appear in clusters. Allowed diphthongs are the following: /aj aːj aw aːw iw iːw uj uːj/.

=== Consonants ===
		Bilabial	Dental/Alveolar			(Alveolo-) Palatal	Velar		Uvular		Glottal
		Bilabial	plain	sibilant	lateral	(Alveolo-) Palatal	plain	labial	plain	labial	Glottal
Plosive/ Affricate	tenuis	p ⟨p⟩	t̪ ⟨t⟩	ts ⟨c⟩	tɬ ⟨ƛ⟩	tʃ ⟨č⟩	k ⟨k⟩	kʷ ⟨kʷ⟩	q ⟨q⟩	qʷ ⟨qʷ⟩	ʔ ⟨ʔ⟩
Plosive/ Affricate	ejective	pʼ ⟨p̓⟩	t̪ʼ ⟨t̓⟩	tsʼ ⟨c̓⟩	tɬʼ ⟨ƛ̓⟩	tʃʼ ⟨č̓⟩	kʼ ⟨k̓⟩	kʷʼ ⟨k̓ʷ⟩	qʼ ⟨q̓⟩	qʷʼ ⟨q̓ʷ⟩	ʔ ⟨ʔ⟩
Fricative				s ⟨s⟩	ɬ ⟨ɫ⟩	ʃ ⟨š⟩	x ⟨x⟩	xʷ ⟨xʷ⟩	χ ⟨x̣⟩	χʷ ⟨x̣ʷ⟩	h ⟨h⟩
Sonorant		m ⟨m⟩	n ⟨n⟩		l ⟨l⟩	j ⟨y⟩		w ⟨w⟩			

Consonant clusters are common and show few restrictions. All words begin with a consonant, even though according to orthographic conventions, an initial glottal stop before a vowel is not written and initial unstressed /ʼɨ/ is not written before /m n l/ plus a consonant. Initial clusters of up to three consonants are allowed (pccák 'pepper'), medials of up to five consonants and finals of up to four consonants (látx̣tx̣ 'ashes'). Clusters of identical consonants also occur: qqápni 'silly', ččù 'quiet'. The laryngeals /h ʼ/ usually occur in initial position and sometimes in intervocalic position.

=== Syllable structure ===
As yet, no detailed description of syllable structure in Umatilla Sahaptin has been written.

=== Stress ===
Primary stress is distinctive and is indicated by an acute accent. It occurs on one syllable of a word. Stress contrast can be seen in the following examples:

ámapa {} amápa
husband.OBJ {} island.LOC

páqʼinušana {} paqʼínušana
{he saw him} {} {they saw (him)}

Nondistinctive secondary and lesser stresses occur phonetically and are conditioned by phonetic and syntactic environments.

=== Phonological processes ===
Alternation in the phonetic shapes of morphemes is frequent and most often vocalic.

Vocalic alternations result from processes (ablaut, epenthesis and truncation) that can be morphologically or phonologically conditioned.

Consonantal alternations arise from two processes: velar stops /k kʼ/ may palatalize to /c č/ and affricates /c č/ become /t/ before /s š/. For instance, /c/ + /š/ becomes /t/ + /š/.

== Morphology ==
The morphological structure of Umatilla and other Sahaptin dialects is synthetic to mildly polysynthetic.

The processes used are clisis, reduplication, ablaut, compounding, suppletion, order and the most common one is affixation (suffixation in particular).

Nouns, adjectives and pronouns inflect for number and case. There are three number categories: singular, dual and plural. The singular is not marked. The dual is marked by the suffix -in (with allomorphs -win, -yn or -n depending on the final). There are two main ways to mark the plural: with the suffix -ma (tílaaki-ma 'women") and by full or partial reduplication (pšwá 'stone', pšwápšwa 'stones'). These two markers can sometimes co-exist in the same word. Several nouns feature irregular plural marks that might have been more widely used in the past, such as the prefix a- and the suffix -tu.

Verbs have the most complex morphology of all the parts of speech. Their internal structure is characterized by three major positions:

1. the pronominal prefix
  This position is not necessarily occupied, it depends on the aspects of sentence structure external to the verb.
2. the theme
  It can be composed of one or several elements. Theme-derivational processes include notions such as the distribution of action and the iteration of action which is expressed by the reduplication of a part of or the totality of the theme (i-ƛúp-ƛúp-ša 'he keeps on jumping up and down', where ƛúp means 'to jump'). Affixations of adverbial notions also occur: qá- 'suddenly', máy- 'in the morning, twá- 'with the edge of a long object', tísɨm- 'while sitting'.
3. the auxiliary suffix complex
  Its inflectional system marks the verbs for:
    - mood: indicative (unmarked), conditional and imperative
    - aspect: imperfective for an action in process (suffix -ša, -šan), customary for the usual character of an action (suffix -x̣a, -x̣an)
    - tense
    - directionality for motion verbs: cislocative suffix -ɨm (motion or activity towards or with respect to speaker), translocative suffix -kik (motion away from the speaker).

== Syntax ==
Umatilla, like other varieties of Sahaptin, is characterized by a free word order and a complex case-marking system.

Noun case endings
	Nonhuman	Human		
	Nonhuman	Singular	Dual	Plural
Unmarked	kʼúsi (horse)	ɨwínš (man)	awínšin	awínšma
Inverse ergative	kʼúsinɨm	ɨwínšnɨm	no dual	no plural
Obviative ergative	kʼúsiyin	ɨwínšin	no dual	no plural
Objective	kʼúsina	ɨwínšna	awínšinaman	awínšmaaman
Comitative	kʼúsiyin	ɨwínšin	no dual	no plural
Genitive	kʼúsinmí	ɨwínšmí	awínšinamí	awínšmaamí
Benefactive	kʼúsiyay	ɨwínšmíyay	awínšinamíyay	awinšmaamíyay
Dative	kʼúsiyaw	ɨwinšmíyaw	awinšinamíyaw	awinšmaamíyaw
Allative	kʼúsikan	ɨwinšmíkan	awinšinamíkan	awinšmaamíkan
Ablative	kʼúsikni	ɨwinšmíkni	awinšinamíkni	awinšmaamíkni
Instrumental	kʼúsiki	ɨwinšmíki	awinšinamíki	awinšmaamíki
Locative	kʼúsipa	ɨwinšmípa	awinšinamípa	awinšmaamípa

== See also ==
- Sahaptian languages
- Sahaptin people
- Umatilla (tribe)

== Sources ==
- Aoki, Haruo. (1994). Nez Perce dictionary. University of California Publications in Linguistics (Vol. 112). Berkeley: University of California Press. ISBN 0-520-09763-7.
- Confederated Tribes of the Umatilla Indian Reservation; Rude, Noel (2014). Umatilla Dictionary. Seattle: Confederated Tribes of the Umatilla Indian Reservation, in association with University of Washington Press. ISBN 9780295994284.
- Rigsby, B. and Rude, N. 1996. Sketch of Sahaptin, a Sahaptian language. Handbook of North American Indians. Vol. 17, Languages: 666-692. Smithsonian Institution, Washington D.C.; ISBN 0-16-048774-9
