= Molala language =

Extinct language of US Pacific Northwest

Molala
- Molalla
- Native to: United States
- Region: Cascade Mountains of Oregon
- Ethnicity: Molala people
- Extinct: 1958, with the death of Fred Yelkes (1885–1958)
- Language family: Penutian?: Plateau Penutian; Molala

Language codes
- ISO 639-3: mbe
- Glottolog: mola1238
- Molala is classified as Extinct by the UNESCO Atlas of the World's Languages in Danger.

Molala is an extinct language once spoken by the Molala people of Oregon. Currently it is included among the Plateau Penutian language family, with Klamath and Sahaptin being considered the closest related.

== Classification ==
=== Waiilatpuan family ===
The first written vocabulary of the Molala language was published by Horatio Hale in 1846. As a member of the United States Exploring Expedition, he had visited the Pacific Northwest in 1841. Missionary Marcus Whitman was credited for providing "much valuable information" about the Cayuse people and other natives nearby Waiilatpu. Hale also recorded a Cayuse language vocabulary with Whitman's assistance. In his Waiilatpuan language family, Hale put Cayuse and Molala as the sole members.

In 1910 or 1911, Stephens Savage, a Molala speaker, had told Leo Frachtenberg that the following five words were identical in both Cayuse and Molala:

sorrel horse	qasqasi tasiwitkwi
spotted horse	yuꞏk tasiwitkwi
black horse	múkimuki tasiwitkwi
comb	taꞏsps
spoon	ƚúꞏpinc

In 1929 Edward Sapir grouped Cayuse with Molala as part of the Waiilatpuan branch of the Plateau Penutian languages.

Bruce Rigsby reexamined the Cayuse-Molala lexical pairs provided by Hale and found only a tenth to be potentially related terms. Whitman was credited as the origin of the Waiilatpuan linguistic family. Upon his review of extant Molala and Cayuse linguistic data, Rigsby concluded "I do not see how the two languages could have possibly been mutually intelligible."

=== Dialects ===
There were three known dialects:

- Northern Molala, spoken in the Molalla River watershed.
- Upper Santiam Molala, spoken along the upper Santiam River.
- Southern Molala, spoken along the headwaters of the Umpqua and Rogue rivers.

== Phonology ==
=== Consonants ===
		Bilabial	Alveolar	Lateral	Palatal	Velar	Uvular	Glottal
Plosive	plain	p	t			k	q	ʔ
Plosive	aspirated	pʰ	tʰ			kʰ	qʰ	
Plosive	ejective	pʼ	tʼ			kʼ	qʼ	
Nasal		m	n			ŋ		
Affricate	plain		ts	tɬ				
Affricate	ejective		tsʼ					
Fricative		ɸ	s	ɬ		x		h
Approximant		w		l	j			

=== Vowels ===
	Short	Long
Close	i	iː
Open	a~e	aː
Back	u	uː

/i/ and /a/ can also shift to [ə].

== Orthography ==
This is an (unofficial) Salish-based orthography for the Molala language:

Molala alphabet (unofficial)
a	aa	c	c̓	e	f	h	i	ii	k	kʰ	k̓	l	ɬ	ƛ	m	n	ŋ	p	pʰ	p̓	q	qʰ	q̓	s	t	tʰ	t̓	u	uu	w	x	y	ʔ
a	aː	ts	tsʼ	e~ə	ɸ	h	i	iː	k	kʰ	k’	l	ɬ	tɬ	m	n	ŋ	p	pʰ	p’	q	qʰ	q’	s	t	tʰ	t’	u	uː	w	x	y	ʔ

== Grammar ==
Molala is a verb-heavy polysynthetic language.

=== Case ===
Molala nouns have seven cases:

1. nominative
2. accusative
3. genitive
4. instrumental
5. locative
6. allative
7. ablative
