= Nez Perce =

Indigenous peoples of North America

Nez Perce Tribe Nimíipuu
nimíipuu
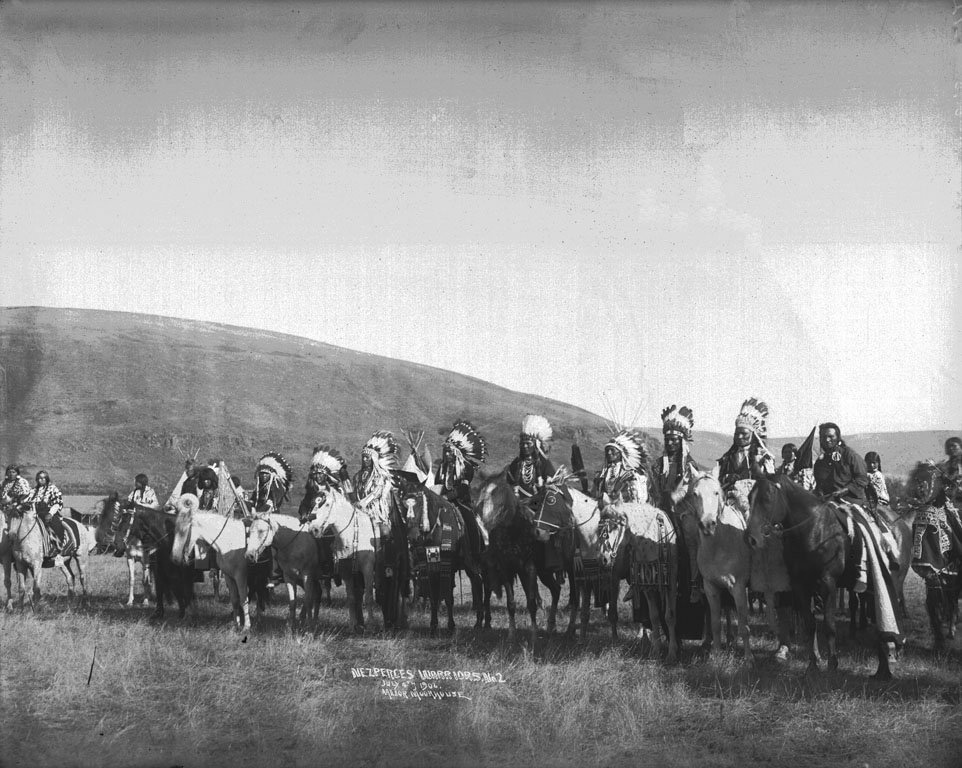
- Nez Percé men, 1906

Total population
- 3,500+

Regions with significant populations
- United States (Idaho)

Languages
- English, nimipuutímt aka Nez Perce

Religion
- Seven Drum (Walasat), Christianity

Related ethnic groups
- Sahaptin peoples

The Nez Perce (/ˈnɛz ˈpɜːrs/ NEZ-purse); autonym in Nez Perce: nimíipuu, meaning 'we, the people') are an Indigenous people of the Plateau who still live on a fraction of their ancestral lands on the southeastern Columbia River Plateau in the Pacific Northwest. This region has been occupied for at least 11,500 years.

Members of the Sahaptin language group, the Nimíipuu were the dominant people of the Columbia Plateau for much of that time, especially after acquiring the horses that led them to breed the Appaloosa horse in the 18th century. Appaloosa horses were the only horses generally available in that time period.

Prior to first contact with European colonial people the Nimíipuu were economically and culturally influential in trade and war, interacting with other indigenous nations in a vast network from the western shores of Oregon and Washington, the high plains of Montana, and the northern Great Basin in southern Idaho and northern Nevada.

French explorers and trappers indiscriminately used and popularized the name "Nez Percé" for the Nimíipuu and nearby Chinook. The name translates as "pierced nose", but only the Chinook used that form of body modification.

Cut off from most of their horticultural sites throughout the Camas Prairie by an 1863 treaty (subsequently known as the "Thief Treaty" or "Steal Treaty" among the Nimíipuu), confinement to reservations in Idaho, Washington and Oklahoma Indian Territory after the Nez Perce War of 1877, and Dawes Act of 1887 land allotments, the Nez Perce remain as a distinct culture and political economic influence within and outside their reservation.

As a federally recognized tribe, the Nez Perce Tribe of Idaho govern their Native reservation in Idaho through a central government headquartered in Lapwai known as the Nez Perce Tribal Executive Committee (NPTEC). They are one of five federally recognized tribes in the state of Idaho. The Nez Perce only own 12% of their own reservation and some Nez Perce lease land to farmers or loggers. Hatching, harvesting and eating salmon is an important cultural and economic strength of the Nez Perce through full ownership or co-management of various salmon fish hatcheries, such as the Kooskia National Fish Hatchery in Kooskia or the Dworshak National Fish Hatchery in Orofino.

Some still speak their traditional language. The Tribe owns and operates two casinos along the Clearwater River (in Kamiah and east of Lewiston), health clinics, a police force and court, community centers, salmon fisheries, radio station, and other institutions that promote economic and cultural self-determination.

== Name and history ==
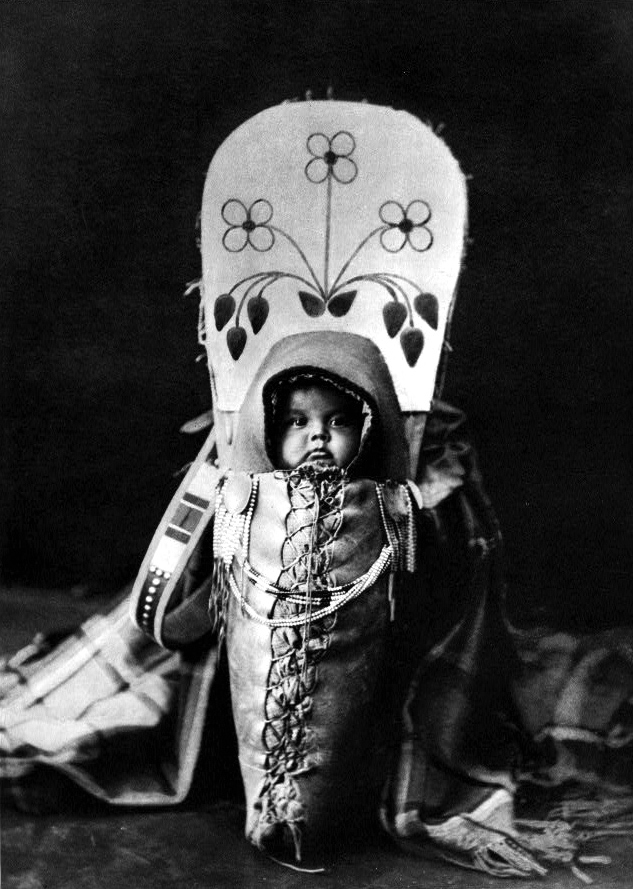
Nez Perce baby in cradleboard, 1911

Their name for themselves is nimíipuu (pronounced [nimiːpuː]), meaning, "we, the people", in their language, part of the Sahaptin family.

Nez Percé is an exonym given by French Canadian fur traders who visited the area regularly in the late 18th century, meaning literally "pierced nose", though this designation is inaccurate "as nose piercing was never practiced by the tribe". English-speaking traders and settlers adopted the name in turn. Since the late 20th century, the Nez Perce identify most often as Nimíipuu in Sahaptin. This has also been spelled Nee-Me-Poo. The Lakota/Dakota named them the Watopala, or Canoe people, from Watopa. After Nez Perce became a more common name, they changed it to Watopahlute. This comes from pahlute, nasal passage, and is simply a play on words. If translated literally, it would come out as either "Nasal Passage of the Canoe" (Watopa-pahlute) or "Nasal Passage of the Grass" (Wato-pahlute). The Assiniboine called them Pasú oȟnógA wįcaštA, the Arikara sinitčiškataríwiš. The tribe also uses the term "Nez Perce", as does the United States Government in its official dealings with them, and contemporary historians. Older historical ethnological works and documents use the French spelling of Nez Percé, with the diacritic. The original French pronunciation is [ne pɛʁse], with three syllables.

The interpreters Sacagawea and Toussaint Charbonneau of the Lewis and Clark Expedition mistakenly identified this people as the Nez Perce when the team encountered the tribe in 1805. Writing in 1889, anthropologist Alice Fletcher, who the U.S. government had sent to Idaho to allot the Nez Perce Reservation, explained the mistaken naming. She wrote,

It is never easy to come at the name of an Indian or even of an Indian tribe. A tribe has always at least two names; one they call themselves by and one by which they are known to other tribes. All the tribes living west of the Rocky Mountains were called "Chupnit-pa-lu", which means people of the pierced noses; it also means emerging from the bushes or forest; the people from the woods. The tribes on the Columbia river used to pierce the nose and wear in it some ornament as you have seen some old fashioned white ladies wear in their ears. Lewis and Clark had with them an interpreter whose wife was a Shoshone or Snake woman and so it came about that when it was asked "What Indians are these?" the answer was "They are 'Chupnit-pa-lu'" and it was written down in the journal; spelled rather queerly, for white people's ears do not always catch Indian tones and of course the Indians could not spell any word.

In his journals, William Clark referred to the people as the Chopunnish /ˈtʃoʊpənɪʃ/, a transliteration of a Sahaptin term. According to D.E. Walker in 1998, writing for the Smithsonian, this term is an adaptation of the term cú·pŉitpeľu (the Nez Perce people). The term is formed from cú·pŉit (piercing with a pointed object) and peľu (people). By contrast, the Nez Perce Language Dictionary has a different analysis than did Walker for the term cú·pŉitpeľu. The prefix cú- means "in single file". This prefix, combined with the verb -piní, "to come out (e.g. of forest, bushes, ice)". Finally, with the suffix of -pelú, meaning "people or inhabitants of". Together, these three elements: cú- + -piní + pelú = cú·pŉitpeľu, or "the People Walking Single File Out of the Forest". Nez Perce oral tradition indicates the name "cú·pŉitpeľu" meant "we walked out of the woods or walked out of the mountains" and referred to the time before the Nez Perce had horses.

== Language ==
The Nez Perce language, or Nimiipuutímt, is a Sahaptian language related to the several dialects of Sahaptin. The Sahaptian sub-family is one of the branches of the Plateau Penutian family, which in turn may be related to a larger Penutian grouping.

== Aboriginal territory ==
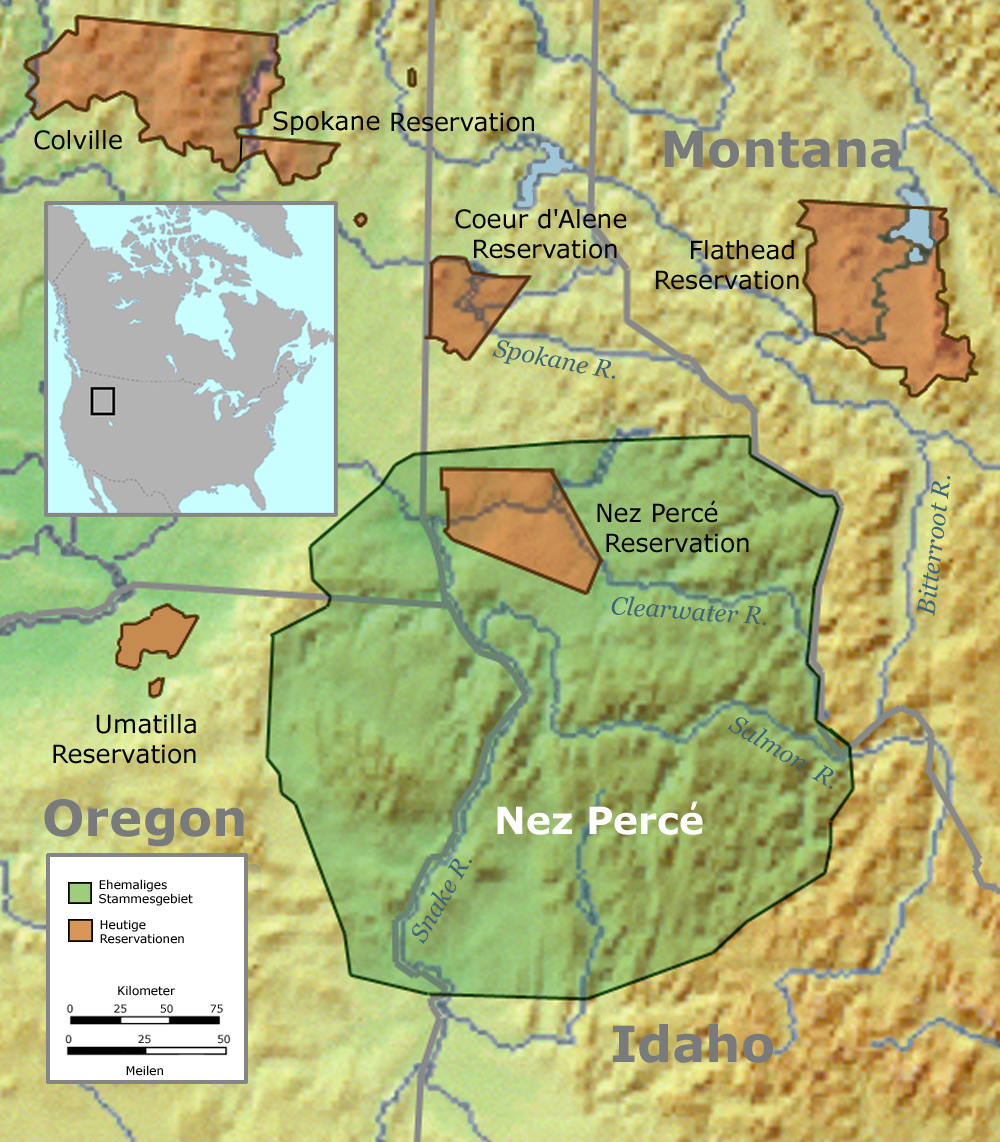
Original Nez Perce territory (green) and the reduced reservation of 1863 (brown)

The Nez Perce territory at the time of Lewis and Clark (1804–1806) was approximately 17,000,000 acres (69,000 km^{2}) and covered parts of present-day Washington, Oregon, Montana, and Idaho, in an area surrounding the Snake (Weyikespe), Grande Ronde River, Salmon (Naco’x kuus) ("Chinook salmon Water") and the Clearwater (Koos-Kai-Kai) ("Clear Water") rivers. The tribal area extended from the Bitterroots in the east (the door to the Northwestern Plains of Montana) to the Blue Mountains in the west between latitudes 45°N and 47°N.

In 1800, the Nez Perce had more than 70 permanent villages, ranging from 30 to 200 individuals, depending on the season and social grouping. Archeologists have identified a total of about 300 related sites including camps and villages, mostly in the Salmon River Canyon. In 1805, the Nez Perce were the largest tribe on the Columbia River Plateau, with a population of about 6,000. By the beginning of the 20th century, the Nez Perce had declined to about 1,800 due to epidemics, conflicts with non-Indians, and other factors. The tribe reports having more than 3,500 members in 2021.

Like other Plateau tribes, the Nez Perce had seasonal villages and camps to take advantage of natural resources throughout the year. Their migration followed a recurring pattern from permanent winter villages through several temporary camps, nearly always returning to the same locations each year. The Nez Perce traveled via the Lolo Trail (Salish: Naptnišaqs – "Nez Perce Trail") (Khoo-say-ne-ise-kit) as far east as the Plains (Khoo-sayn / Kuseyn) ("Buffalo country") of Montana to hunt buffalo (Qoq'a lx) and as far west as the Pacific Coast (’Eteyekuus) ("Big Water"). Before the 1957 construction of The Dalles Dam, which flooded this area, Celilo Falls (Silayloo) was a favored location on the Columbia River (Xuyelp) ("The Great River") for salmon (lé'wliks)-fishing. The Columbia Basin Initiative aims to improve salmon-fishing for the tribe.

== Enemies and allies ==
The Nez Perce had many allies and trading partners among neighboring peoples, but also enemies and ongoing antagonist tribes.

To the north of them lived the Coeur d’Alene (Schitsu'umsh) (’Iskíicu’mix), Spokane (Sqeliz) (Heyéeynimuu/Heyeynimu - "Steelhead [Eating] People"), and further north the Kalispel (Ql̓ispé) (Qem’éespel’uu/Q'emespelu, both meaning "Camas People" or "Camas Eaters"), Colville (Páapspaloo/Papspelu - "Fir Tree People") and Kootenay / Kootenai (Ktunaxa) (Kuuspel’úu/Kuuspelu - "Water People", lit. "River People").

To the northwest lived the Palus (Pelúucpuu/Peluutspu - "People of Pa-luš-sa/Palus [village]") and to the west the Cayuse (Lik-si-yu) (Weyíiletpuu – "Ryegrass People"), west bound there were found the Umatilla (Imatalamłáma) (Hiyówatalampoo/Hiyuwatalampo), Walla Walla, Wasco (Wecq’úupuu) and Sk'in (Tike’éspel’uu) and northwest of the latter various Yakama bands (Lexéyuu).

To the south lived the Snake Indians (various Northern Paiute (Numu) bands (Hey’ǘuxcpel’uu) in the southwest and Bannock (Nimi Pan a'kwati)-Northern Shoshone (Newe) bands (Tiwélqe/Tewelk'a, later Sosona') in the southeast).

To the east lived the Lemhi Shoshone (Lémhaay), north of them the Bitterroot Salish / Flathead (Seliš) (Séelix/Se'lix).

Further east and northeast on the Northern Plains were the Crow (Apsáalooke) (’Isúuxe/Isuuxh'e - "Crow People") and two powerful alliances – the Iron Confederacy (Nehiyaw-Pwat) (named after the dominating Plains and Woods Cree (Paskwāwiyiniwak and Sakāwithiniwak) and Assiniboine (Nakoda) (Wihnen’íipel’uu), an alliance of northern plains Native American nations based around the fur trade, and later included the Stoney (Nakoda), Western Saulteaux / Plains Ojibwe (Bungi or Nakawē) (Sat'sashipunu/Sat'sashipuun - "Porcupine People" or "Porcupine Eater"), and Métis) and the Blackfoot Confederacy (Niitsitapi or Siksikaitsitapi) (’Isq’óyxnix/Issq-oykinix - "Blackfooted People") (composed of three Blackfoot speaking peoples – the Piegan or Peigan (Piikáni), the Kainai or Bloods (Káínaa), and the Siksika or Blackfoot (Siksikáwa), later joined by the unrelated Sarcee (Tsuu T'ina) and (for a time) by Gros Ventre or Atsina (A'aninin) (H'elutiin)).

The feared Blackfoot Confederacy and the various Teton Sioux (Lakota) (Iseq'uulkt - "Cut Throats") and their later allies, the Cheyenne (Suhtai/Sutaio Tsitsistas) (T'septitimeni'n - "[People with] Painted arrows"), were the main enemies of the Plateau peoples when entering the Northwestern Plains to hunt buffalo.

== Historic regional bands, bands, local groups, and villages ==
- Almotipu Band

Territories along Snake River in Hells Canyon up to about 80 miles south of today's Lewiston, Idaho (Simiinekem – "confluence of two rivers" or "river fork", as the Clearwater flows into the Snake River here), in Wallowa Mountains and in the Seven Devils Mountains in Oregon and Idaho. Their fishing and hunting grounds were also used by the Pelloatpallah Band (comprising the "Palus (or Palus proper) Band" and "Wawawai Band" of the Upper Palus Regional Band), who formed bilingual Palus-Nez-Percé bands due to many mixed marriages.
Several village based bands are counted among them:
- the Nuksiwepu Band
- the Palótpu Band (their village Palót was on the north bank of the Snake River – about 2 to 3 miles above Sáhatp)
- the Pinewewixpu (Pinăwăwipu) Band (their village Pinăwăwi was located at Penawawa Creek)
- the Sahatpu (Sáhatpu) Band (their village Sáhatp was located on the north bank of the Snake River, above Wawáwih)
- the Siminekempu (Shimínĕkĕmpu) Band (their village Shimínĕkĕm – "confluence", was located in the area of present-day Lewiston)
- the Tokalatoinu (Tukálatuinu) Band (along the Tucannon River (Took-kahl-la-toin), a tributary of the Snake River)
- the Wawawipu Band (their village Wawáwih was located at Wawawai Creek, a tributary of the Snake River)

- Alpowna (Alpowai) Band or Alpowe'ma (Alpoweyma/Alpowamino) Band ("People along Alpaha (Alpowa) Creek" or "People of ’Al’pawawaii, i.e. Clarkston")

Territories along the South and Middle Fork of the Clearwater River downstream to the city of Lewiston (and south of it) in eastern Washington and the Idaho Panhandle. They also spent much time east of the Bitterroot Mountains and camped along the Yellowstone River, their main meeting place and one of the most important fishing grounds was the area of Kooskia, Idaho (Leewikees). Their fishing and hunting grounds were also used by the "Wawawai Band" of the Upper Palus Regional Band, who lived directly to the west and formed a bilingual Palus-Nez-Percé Band due to many intermarriages. They were the third largest Nez Percé regional group and their tribal area was one of the four centres for the large regional groups of the Nez Percé.
several village based bands are counted among them:
- the Alpowna (Alpowai) Band or Alpowe'ma (Alpoweyma/Alpowamino) Band (largest and most important band, along the Alpaha (Alpowa) Creek, a small tributary of the Clearwater), west of Clarkston, Washington ('Al'pawawaii = People of a "place of a plant called Ahl-pa-ha")
- the Tsokolaikiinma Band (between Lewiston and Alpowa Creek)
- the Hasotino (Hăsotōinu) Band (their settlement Hasutin / Hăsotōin was an important fishing ground at Asotin Creek (Héesutine – "eel river") on the Snake River in Nez Perce County, Idaho, directly opposite the present town of Asotin, Washington)
  - the Heswéiwewipu/Hăsweiwăwihpu local group (their village Hăsweiwăwih was also located opposite Asotin, along a small creek whose upper reaches were called Heswé/Hăsiwĕ)
  - the Anatōinnu local group (their village Ánatōin was located at the confluence of Mill Creek and the Snake River)
- the Sapachesap Band
- the Witkispu Band (about 3 miles below Alpowa Creek, along the eastern bank of the Snake River)
- the Sálwepu Band (at the Middle Fork of the Clearwater River, about 5 miles above present-day Kooskia, Idaho, Chief Looking Glass Group)

- Assuti Band ("People along Assuti Creek" in Idaho, joined Chief Joseph in the war of 1877.)
- Atskaaiwawipu Band or Asahkaiowaipu Band ("People at the confluence, People from the river mouth, i.e. Ahsahka")

Territories from their winter village Ahsahka/Asaqa ("river mouth" or "confluence") up to the Salmon Ridge along the North Fork Clearwater River up to its mouth into the Clearwater River, hunted sometimes near Peck, Idaho (Pipyuuninma) in the territory of the Painima Band. An important fishing ground was Bruce Eddy in Clearwater County, Idaho, which was traditionally owned by the Atskaaiwawipu (Asahkaiowaipu), but was shared by neighboring bands upon invitation: the Tewepu Band, the Ilasotino (Hasotino) Band, the Nipihama (Nipĕhĕmă) Band, the Alpowna (Alpowai) Band and the Matalaimo ("People further upstream", a collective term for bands that had their center around Kamiah).

- Hatweme (Hatwēme) Band or Hatwai (Héetwey) Band ("People along Hatweh Creek", a tributary of the Clearwater River, about four to five miles east of Lewiston)
- Hinsepu Band (lived along the Grande Ronde River in Oregon.)
- Kămiăhpu Band or Kimmooenim Band ("People of Kămiăhp", "People of the Many Rope Litters Place, i.e. Kamiah")

Their main village Kămiăhp was located on the south side of the Clearwater River and the confluence of Lawyer Creek near today's Kamiah, Idaho ("many rope litters") in the Kamiah Valley. They used with other bands the important fishing grounds near Bruce Eddy in Clearwater County, Idaho, which was in the territory of the Atskaaiwawipu (Asahkaiowaipu) Band. Other Nez Perce bands often grouped them under the collective name Uyame or Uyămă; the closely related and neighboring Atskaaiwawipu (Asahkaiowaipu) Band referred to all bands around Kamiah as Matalaimo ("People further upstream"). Their tribal area was one of the four centers for the major regional groups of the Nez Percé.
several village based bands are counted among them:
- the Kămiăhpu (Kimmooenim) Band (was the biggest and most important band of the Kamiah Valley area)
- the Tewepu Band ("People of Téewe, i.e. Orofino, Idaho" at the confluence of Orofino Creek and Clearwater River)
- the Tuke'liklikespu (Tukē'lĭklĭkespu) Band (near Big Eddy on the north bank of the Clearwater River, some miles upstream from Orofino)
- the Pipu'inimu Band (at Big Canyon Creek in Camas Prairie, which flows into the Clearwater River north of today's Peck; they were therefore direct neighbours of the southern Painima Band),
- the Painima Band (near present-day Peck, Idaho (Pipyuuninma) in Nez Perce County, on the Clearwater River in Idaho)

- Kannah Band or Kam'nakka Band ("People of Kannah (along Clearwater River)" in Idaho)
- Lamtáma (Lamátta) Band or Lamatama Band ("People of a region with little snow, i.e. Lamtáma (Lamátta) region")

Territories were between the Alpowai Band in the north and downstream in the northwest the Pikunan (Pikunin) Band and extended in the Idaho Panhandle north along the Upper Salmon River (Naco'x kuus – "Salmon River") and one of its tributaries, the White Bird Creek, and to the Snake River in the southwest, and also included the White Bird Canyon (deeper than the Grand Canyon) in the southwest of the Clearwater Mountains and southeast of the Camas prairie. Their tribal area and band name is derived from Lamtáma (Lamátta) ("area with little snow") and refers to its excellent climatic conditions, which were particularly suitable for horse breeding. They were the second largest Nez Percé regional group; also called Salmon River Band.
- the Esnime (Iyăsnimă) Band (along Slate Creek ('Iyeesnime) and Upper Salmon River, therefore often simply called Slate Creek Band or Upper Salmon River Indians)
- the Nipihama (Nipĕhĕmă) Band (from Lower Salmon River to White Bird Creek)
- the Tamanmu Band (their settlement Tamanma was located at the mouth of the Salmon River in Idaho)

- Lapwai Band or Lapwēme Band ("People of the Butterfly Place, i.e. Lapwai")

Territories along Sweetwater Creek and Lapwai Creek up to its confluence with the Clearwater River near today's Spalding, Idaho. One of their traditional settlements (as well as an important meeting place for neighbouring bands) was on the site of today's Lapwai, Idaho (Thlap-Thlap, also: Léepwey – "Place of the Butterflies"), the tribal and administrative centre of the Nez Percé Tribe of Idaho. Their tribal area was one of the four centers for the major regional groups of the Nez Percé.

- Mákapu Band ("People from Máka/Maaqa along Cottonwood Creek (formerly: Maka Creek"), a tributary of the Clearwater River, Idaho.)
- Pikunan (Pikunin) Band or Pikhininmu Band ("Snake River People")

Territories encompassed the vast mountain wilderness between the Snake River in the south and the Lower Salmon River in the north until it met the Snake River, were direct neighbours of the Wallowa (Willewah) Band on the opposite bank of the Snake River in the west and the Lamtáma (Lamátta) Band living further southeast of them. They could be classified as buffalo hunters, but they were also true mountain dwellers, also called the Snake River tribe.

- Saiksaikinpu Band (on the upper portion of the Southern Fork Clearwater; their immediate neighbors downstream was the Tukpame Band)
- Saxsano Band (about 4 miles above Asotin, Washington, on the east side of Snake River.)
- Taksehepu Band ("People of Tukeespe/Tu-kehs-pa APS, i.e. Ghost town Agatha")
- Tukpame Band (on the lower portion of the Southern Fork Clearwater; their immediate neighbors upstream was the Saiksaikinpu Band.)
- Wallowa (Willewah) Band or Walwáma (Walwáama) Band ("People along the Wallowa River" or "People along the Grand Ronde River")

Territories in northeastern Oregon and northwestern Idaho with tribal centre in the river valleys of the Imnaha River, the Minam River and the Wallowa River (Wal'awa – "the winding river"). Their territory extended into the Blue Mountains (already claimed by the Cayuse) in the west, to the Wallowa Mountains in the southwest, to both sides of the Grande Ronde River (Waliwa or Willewah) and its confluence with the Snake River in the north, and almost to the Snake River in the east. Their area was widely known as an excellent grazing ground for the large herds of horses and was therefore often used by the neighbouring and related Weyiiletpuu (Wailetpu) Band ("Ryegrass People, i.e. the Cayuse people). They were often grouped under the collective name Kămúinnu or Qéemuynu ("People of the Indian Hemp"). They were the largest Nez Percé group and their tribal area was one of the four centers for the major regional groups of the Nez Percé. Today most are part of the Confederated Tribes of the Colville Reservation.
several village based bands are counted among them:
- the Wallowa (Willewah) Band (the largest band with several local groups, in the Wallowa River Valley and Zumwalt Prairie)
- the Imnáma (Imnámma) Band (lived with several local groups isolated in the Imnaha River Valley)
- the Weliwe (Wewi'me) Band (their settlement Williwewix was located at the mouth of the Grande Ronde River)
- the Inantoinu Band (in Joseph Canyon – known as saqánma ("long, wild canyon") or an-an-a-soc-um ("long, rough canyon") – and along Lower Joseph Creek to its mouth into the Grande Ronde River)
- the Toiknimapu Band (above Joseph Creek and along the north bank of the Grande Ronde River)
- the Isäwisnemepu (Isawisnemepu) Band (near the present Zindel, at the Grande Ronde River in Oregon)
- the Sakánma Band (several local groups along the Snake River between the mouth of the Salmon River in the south and the Grande Ronde River in the north, the name of their main village Sakán and the band name Sakánma refers to an area where the cliffs rise close to the water – this could be Joseph Canyon (Saqánma))

- Yakama Band or Yăkámă Band ("People of the Yăká River, i.e.Potlatch River (above its mouth into the Clearwater River)", not to confused with the Yakama peoples)

Territories along the Potlatch River (which was called Yăká above its mouth into the Clearwater River) in Idaho.
several village based bands are counted among them:
- the Yakto'inu (Yaktōinu) Band (their village Yaktōin was located at the mouth of the Potlatch River into the Clearwater River)
- the Yatóinu Band (lived along Pine Creek, a small right tributary of the Potlatch River)
- the Iwatoinu (Iwatōinu) Band (their village Iwatōin was located on the north bank of the Potlatch River near today's Kendrick in Latah County)
- the Tunèhepu (Tunĕhĕpu) Band (their village Tunĕhĕ was located at the mouth of Middle Potlatch Creek into the Potlatch River, near Juliaetta, Idaho (Yeqe))

Because of large amount of inter-marriage between Nez Perce bands and neighboring tribes or bands to forge alliances and peace (often living in mixed bilingual villages together), the following bands were also counted to the Nez Perce (which today are viewed as being linguistically and culturally closely related, but separate ethnic groups):

Walla Walla Band
These were the Walla Walla people which lived along the Walla Walla River and along the confluence of the Snake and Columbia River rivers, today they are enrolled in the Confederated Tribes of the Umatilla Indian Reservation.
Pelloatpallah Band or Palous Band
These were the Palus (or Palus proper) Band and Wawawai Band of the Upper Palus Band, which constituted together with the Middle Palus Band und Lower Palus Band – one of the three main groups of the Palus people, which lived along the Columbia, Snake and Palouse Rivers to the northwest of the Nez Perce. Today the majority is enrolled in the Confederated Tribes and Bands of the Yakama Nation and some are part of the Confederated Tribes of the Colville Reservation.
Weyiiletpuu (Wailetpu) Band or Yeletpo Band
These were the Cayuse people which lived to the west of the Nez Perce at the headwaters of the Walla Walla, Umatilla and Grande Ronde River and from the Blue Mountains westwards up to the Deschutes River, they oft shared village sites with the Nez Perce and Palus and were feared by neighboring tribes, as early as 1805, most Cayuse had given up their mother tongue and had switched to Weyíiletpuu, a variety of the Lower Nez Perce/Lower Nimiipuutímt dialect of the Nez Perce language. They called themselves by their Nez-Percé name as Weyiiletpuu ("Ryegrass People"); today most Cayuse are enrolled into the Confederated Tribes of the Umatilla Indian Reservation, some as Confederated Tribes of Warm Springs or Nez Perce Tribe of Idaho.

== Culture ==
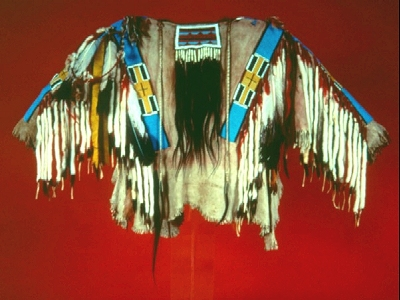
A traditional Nez Perce beaded shirt

The semi-sedentary Nez Percés were hunter-gatherers, living in a society in which most or all food is obtained by foraging (collecting wild plants and roots and pursuing wild animals). They depended on hunting, fishing, and the gathering of wild roots and berries.

Nez Perce people historically depended on various Pacific salmon and Pacific trout for their food: Chinook salmon or nacoox (Oncorhynchus tschawytscha) were eaten the most, but other species such as Pacific lamprey (Entosphenus tridentatus or Lampetra tridentata), and chiselmouth (Gila alutacea) were eaten too. Other important fishes included the sockeye salmon (Oncorhynchus nerka), silver salmon or ka'llay (Oncorhynchus kisutch), chum salmon or dog salmon or ka'llay (Oncorhynchus keta), mountain whitefish or ci'mey (Prosopium williamsoni), white sturgeon (Acipenser transmontanus), white sucker or mu'quc (Catostomus commersonii), and varieties of trout – West Coast steelhead or heyey (Oncorhynchus mykiss), brook trout or pi'ckatyo (Salvelinus fontinalis), bull trout or i'slam (Salvelinus confluentus), and cutthroat trout or wawa'lam (Oncorhynchus clarkii).

Prior to contact with Europeans, the Nez Perce's traditional hunting and fishing areas spanned from the Cascade Range in the west to the Bitterroot Mountains in the east.

Historically, in late May and early June, Nez Perce villagers crowded to communal fishing sites to trap eels, steelhead, and chinook salmon, or haul in fish with large dip nets. Fishing took place throughout the summer and fall, first on the lower streams and then on the higher tributaries, and catches also included salmon, sturgeon, whitefish, suckers, and varieties of trout. Most of the supplies for winter use came from a second run in the fall, when large numbers of Sockeye salmon, silver, and dog salmon appeared in the rivers.

Fishing is traditionally an important ceremonial and commercial activity for the Nez Perce tribe. Today Nez Perce fishers participate in tribal fisheries in the mainstream Columbia River between Bonneville and McNary dams. The Nez Perce also fish for spring and summer Chinook salmon and rainbow trout and steelhead in the Snake River and its tributaries. The Nez Perce tribe runs the Nez Perce Tribal Hatchery on the Clearwater River, as well as several satellite hatchery programs.

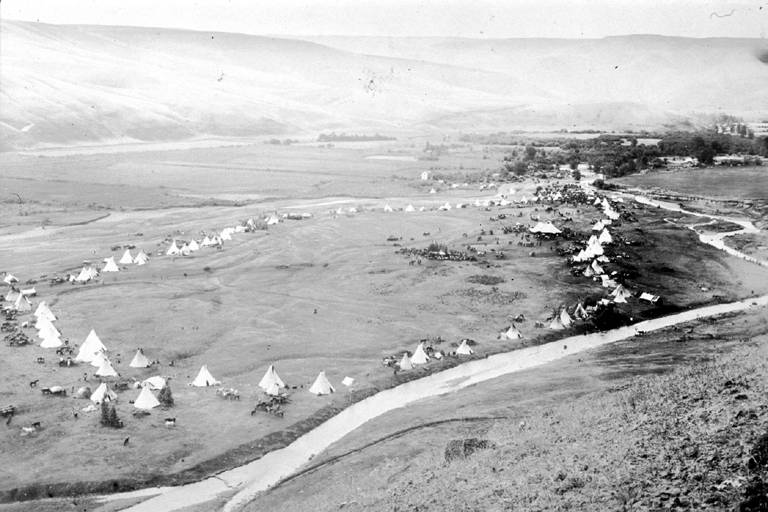
Nez Perce encampment, Lapwai, Idaho, c. 1899

The first fishing of the season was accompanied by prescribed rituals and a ceremonial feast known as kooyit. Thanksgiving was offered to the Creator and to the fish for having returned and given themselves to the people as food. In this way, it was hoped that the fish would return the next year.

Like salmon, plants contributed to traditional Nez Perce culture in both material and spiritual dimensions.

Aside from fish and game, Plant foods provided over half of the dietary calories, with winter survival depending largely on dried roots, especially Kouse, or qáamsit (when fresh) and qáaws (when peeled and dried) (Lomatium especially Lomatium cous), and camas or qém'es (Nez Perce: "sweet") (Camassia quamash), the first being roasted in pits, while the other was ground in mortars and molded into cakes for future use, both plants had been traditionally an important food and trade item. Women were primarily responsible for the gathering and preparing of these root crops. Camas bulbs were gathered in the region between the Salmon and Clearwater river drainages. Techniques for preparing and storing winter foods enabled people to survive times of colder winters with little or no fresh foods.

Favorite fruits dried for winter were serviceberries or kel (Amelanchier alnifolia or Saskatoon berry), black huckleberries or cemi'tk (Vaccinium membranaceum), red elderberries or mi'ttip (Sambucus racemosa var. melanocarpa), and chokecherries or ti'ms (Prunus virginiana var. melanocarpa). Nez Perce textiles were made primarily from dogbane or qeemu (Apocynum cannabinum or Indian hemp), tules or to'ko (Schoenoplectus acutus var. acutus), and western redcedar or tala'tat (Thuja plicata). The most important industrial woods were redcedar, ponderosa pine or la'qa (Pinus ponderosa), Douglas fir or pa'ps (Pseudotsuga menziesii), sandbar willow or tax's (Salix exigua), and hard woods such as Pacific yew or ta'mqay (Taxus brevifolia) and syringa or sise'qiy (Philadelphus lewisii or Indian arrowwood).

Many fishes and plants important to Nez Perce culture are today state symbols: the black huckleberry or cemi'tk is the official state fruit and the Indian arrowwood or sise'qiy, the Douglas fir or pa'ps is the state tree of Oregon and the ponderosa pine or la'qa of Montana, the Chinook salmon is the state fish of Oregon, the cutthroat trout or wawa'lam of Idaho, Montana and Wyoming, and the West Coast steelhead or "heyey" of Washington.

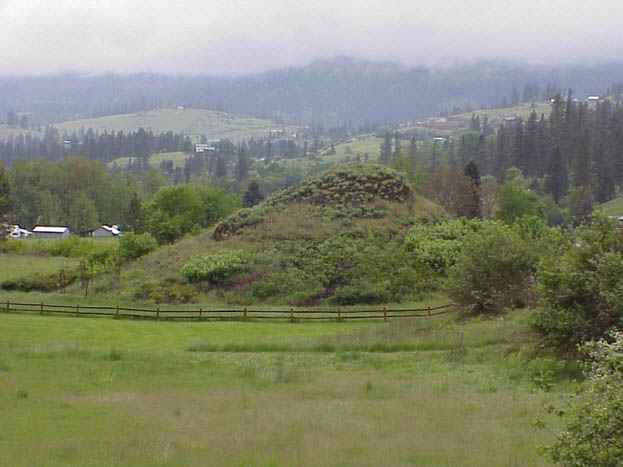
"The Heart of the Monster", described in the Nez Perce origin story

The Nez Perce believed in spirits called weyekins (Wie-a-kins) which would, they thought, offer a link to the invisible world of spiritual power". The weyekin would protect one from harm and become a personal guardian spirit. To receive a weyekin, a seeker would go to the mountains alone on a vision quest. This included fasting and meditation over several days. While on the quest, the individual may receive a vision of a spirit, which would take the form of a mammal or bird. This vision could appear physically or in a dream or trance. The weyekin was to bestow the animal's powers on its bearer—for example; a deer might give its bearer swiftness. A person's weyekin was very personal. It was rarely shared with anyone and was contemplated in private. The weyekin stayed with the person until death.

Helen Hunt Jackson, author of "A Century of Dishonor", written in 1881 refers to the Nez Perce as "the richest, noblest, and most gentle" of Indian peoples as well as the most industrious.

The museum at the Nez Perce National Historical Park, headquartered in Spalding, Idaho, and managed by the National Park Service, includes a research center, archives, and library. Historical records are available for on-site study and interpretation of Nez Perce history and culture. The park includes 38 sites associated with the Nez Perce in the states of Idaho, Montana, Oregon, and Washington, many of which are managed by local and state agencies.

== History ==
=== European contact ===
In 1805 William Clark was the first known Euro-American to meet any of the tribe, excluding the aforementioned French Canadian traders. While he, Meriwether Lewis and their men were crossing the Bitterroot Mountains, they ran low of food, and Clark took six hunters and hurried ahead to hunt. On September 20, 1805, near the western end of the Lolo Trail, he found a small camp at the edge of the camas-digging ground, which is now called Weippe Prairie. The explorers were favorably impressed by the Nez Perce whom they met. Preparing to make the remainder of their journey to the Pacific by boats on rivers, they entrusted the keeping of their horses until they returned to "2 brothers and one son of one of the Chiefs." One of these Indians was Walammottinin (meaning "Hair Bunched and tied," but more commonly known as Twisted Hair). He was the father of Chief Lawyer, who by 1877 was a prominent member of the "Treaty" faction of the tribe. The Nez Perce were generally faithful to the trust; the party recovered their horses without serious difficulty when they returned.

Recollecting the Nez Perce encounter with the Lewis and Clark party, in 1889 anthropologist Alice Fletcher wrote that "the Lewis and Clark explorers were the first white men that many of the people had ever seen and the women thought them beautiful." She wrote that the Nez Perce "were kind to the tired and hungry party. They furnished fresh horses and dried meat and fish with wild potatoes and other roots which were good to eat, and the refreshed white men went further on, westward, leaving their bony, wornout horses for the Indians to take care of and have fat and strong when Lewis and Clark should come back on their way home." On their return trip they arrived at the Nez Perce encampment the following spring, again hungry and exhausted. The tribe constructed a large tent for them and again fed them. Desiring fresh red meat, the party offered an exchange for a Nez Perce horse. Quoting from the Lewis and Clark diary, Fletcher writes, "The hospitality of the Chiefs was offended at the idea of an exchange. He observed that his people had an abundance of young horses and that if we were disposed to use that food, we might have as many as we wanted." The party stayed with the Nez Perce for a month before moving on.

=== Flight of the Nez Perce ===
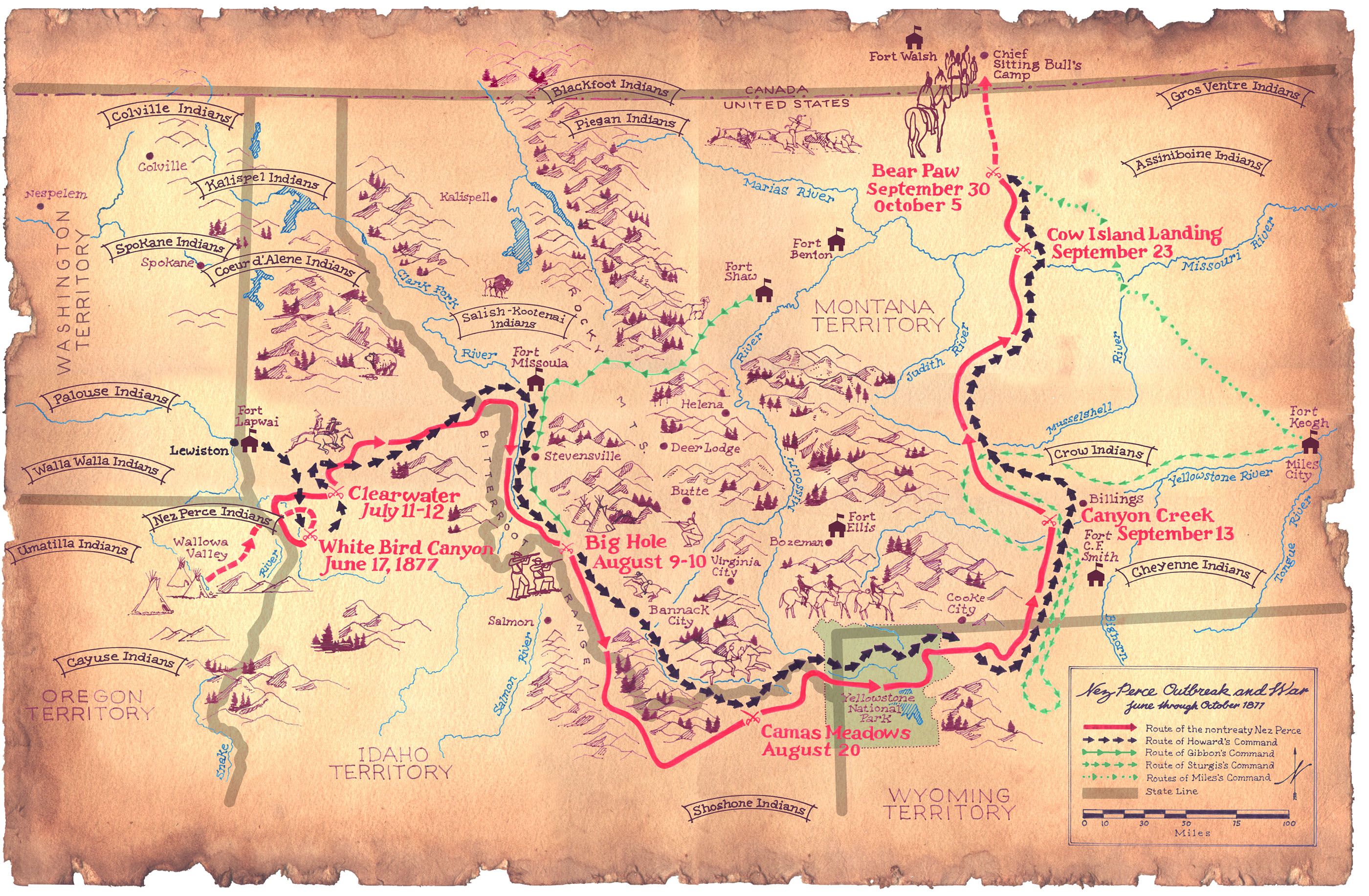
Map showing the flight of the Nez Perce and key battle sites

The Nez Perce were one of the tribal nations at the Walla Walla Council (1855) (along with the Cayuse, Umatilla, Walla Walla, and Yakama), which signed the Treaty of Walla Walla.

Under pressure from the European Americans, in the late 19th century the Nez Perce split into two groups: one side accepted the coerced relocation to a reservation and the other refused to give up their fertile land in Washington and Oregon. Those willing to go to a reservation made a treaty in 1877. The flight of the non-treaty Nez Perce began on June 15, 1877, with Chief Joseph, Looking Glass, White Bird, Ollokot, Lean Elk (Poker Joe) and Toohoolhoolzote leading 750 men, women and children in an attempt to reach a peaceful sanctuary. They intended to seek shelter with their allies the Crow but, upon the Crow's refusal to offer help, the Nez Perce tried to reach the camp in Canada of Lakota Chief Sitting Bull. He had migrated there instead of surrendering after the Indian victory at the Battle of the Little Bighorn.

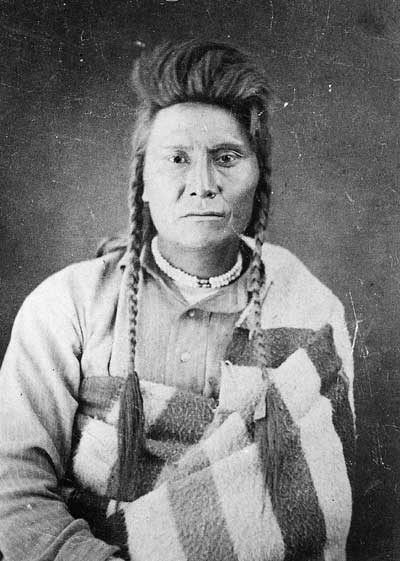
Chief Joseph, 1877

Chief Joseph, Nez Perces.

The Nez Perce were pursued by over 2,000 soldiers of the U.S. Army on an epic flight to freedom of more than 1,170 miles (1,880 km) across four states and multiple mountain ranges. The 250 Nez Perce warriors defeated or held off the pursuing troops in 18 battles, skirmishes, and engagements. More than 100 US soldiers and 100 Nez Perce (including women and children) were killed in these conflicts.

A majority of the surviving Nez Perce were finally forced to surrender on October 5, 1877, after the Battle of the Bear Paw Mountains in Montana, 40 miles (64 km) from the Canada–US border. Chief Joseph surrendered to General Oliver O. Howard of the U.S. Cavalry. During the surrender negotiations, Chief Joseph sent a message, usually described as a speech, to the US soldiers. It has become renowned as one of the greatest American speeches: "...Hear me, my chiefs, I am tired. My heart is sick and sad. From where the sun now stands, I will fight no more forever."

Chief Joseph went to Washington, D.C., in January 1879 to meet with the President and Congress, after which his account was published in the North American Review.

The route of the Nez Perce flight is preserved by the Nez Perce National Historic Trail. The annual Cypress Hills ride in June commemorates the Nez Perce people's attempt to escape to Canada.

=== Horse breeding program ===
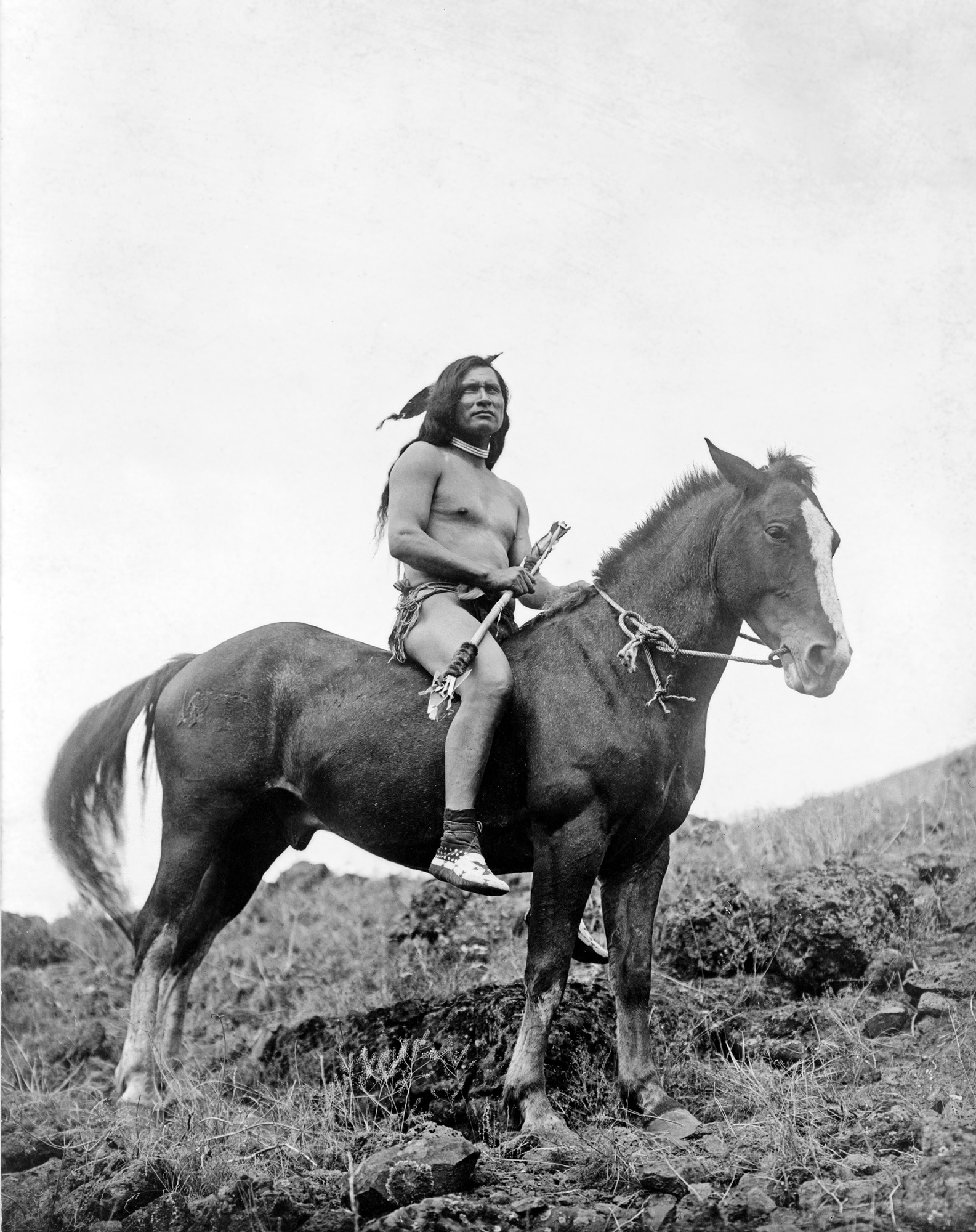
Nez Perce warrior on horse, 1910

In 1994 the Nez Perce tribe began a breeding program, based on crossbreeding the Appaloosa and a Central Asian breed called Akhal-Teke, to produce what they called the Nez Perce Horse. They wanted to restore part of their traditional horse culture, where they had conducted selective breeding of their horses, long considered a marker of wealth and status, and trained their members in a high quality of horsemanship. Social disruption due to reservation life and assimilationist pressures by Americans and the government resulted in the destruction of their horse culture in the 19th century. The 20th-century breeding program was financed by the United States Department of Health and Human Services, the Nez Perce tribe, and the nonprofit called the First Nations Development Institute. It has promoted businesses in Native American country that reflect values and traditions of the peoples. The Nez Perce Horse breed is noted for its speed.

== Current tribal lands ==
Map of the Nez Perce tribal territory and neighboring tribes in Idaho.

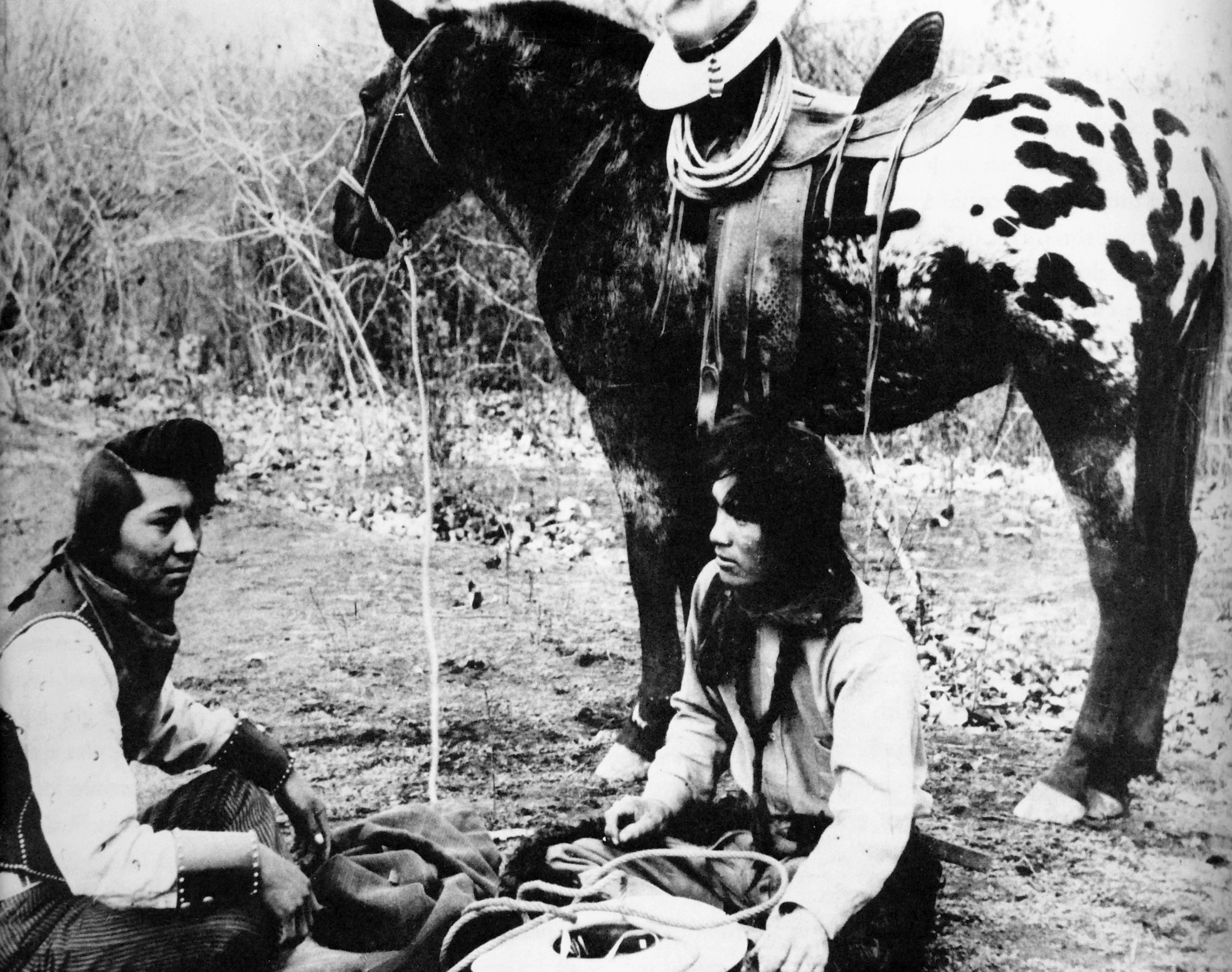
Nez Perce Indians with Appaloosa horse, around 1895

The current tribal lands consist of a reservation in North Central Idaho at 46°18′N 116°24′W, primarily in the Camas Prairie region south of the Clearwater River, in parts of four counties. In descending order of surface area, the counties are Nez Perce, Lewis, Idaho, and Clearwater. The total land area is about 1,195 square miles (3,100 km^{2}), and the reservation's population at the 2000 census was 17,959.

Due to tribal loss of lands, the population on the reservation is predominantly white, nearly 90% in 1988. The largest community is the city of Orofino, near its northeast corner. Lapwai is the seat of tribal government, and it has the highest percentage of Nez Perce people as residents, at about 81.4 percent.

Similar to the opening of Native American lands in Oklahoma by allowing acquisition of surplus by non-natives after households received plots, the U.S. government opened the Nez Percé reservation for general settlement on November 18, 1895. The proclamation had been signed less than two weeks earlier by President Grover Cleveland. Thousands rushed to grab land on the reservation, staking out their claims even on land owned by Nez Perce families.

The Nez Perce Wallowa Homeland at Wallowa in northeast Oregon is in the historic territory of the large Wallowa Band. The Homeland has owned 320 acres (130 ha) and a visitor center since 2000, to "enrich relationships among the descendants of indigenous people and the contemporary inhabitants of the Wallowa Valley ... [and to] preserve and celebrate the customs and culture of the indigenous inhabitants." A Methodist church was established in Wallowa in 1877, and in 2021 the United Methodist Church returned a small parcel of land and the church building to the Nez Perce Tribe.

== Annual cultural events ==
The Tamkaliks Celebration is a powwow named after the Nez Perce word for where you can see the mountains. It began in 1991 to welcome the Nez Perce back home to the Wallowa Valley.

=== Communities ===
- Craigmont
- Culdesac
- Ferdinand
- Kamiah
- Kooskia
- Lapwai
- Nezperce
- Orofino
- Peck
- Reubens
- Stites
- Sweetwater
- Winchester

In addition, the Colville Indian Reservation in eastern Washington contains the Joseph band of Nez Percé.

== Notable people ==
- Archie Phinney (1904–1949), scholar and administrator who studied under Franz Boas at Columbia University and produced Nez Perce Texts, a published collection of Nez Perce myths and legends from the oral tradition
- Chief Joseph (hinmatóoyalahtq'it – "Thunder traveling to higher areas") (1840–1904), also known as Young Joseph, the best-known leader of the Nez Perce, who led his people in their struggle to retain their identity, with about 60 warriors, he commanded the greatest following of the non-treaty chiefs.
- Chief Lawyer (Hallalhotsoot, Halalhot'suut) (c. 1796–1876), son of a Salish-speaking Flathead woman and Twisted Hair, the Nez Perce who welcomed and befriended the exhausted Lewis and Clark Expedition in the September 1805. His father's positive experiences with the whites greatly influenced him, leader of the treaty faction of the Nez Percé, and signed the 1855 Walla Walla Treaty and controversial 1863 treaty. He was called the Lawyer by fur trappers because of his oratory and ability to speak several languages. He defended the actions of the 1863 Treaty which cost the Nez Perce nearly 90% of their lands after gold was discovered because he knew it was futile to resist the US government and its military power. He tried to negotiate the best outcome which still allowed the majority of Nez Perce to live in their usual village locations. He died, frustrated that the U.S. government failed to follow through on the promises made in both treaties, even making a trip to Washington, D.C. to express his frustration. He is buried at the Nikesa Cemetery at the Presbyterian church in Kamiah.
- Claudia Kauffman, a politician in Washington state
- Eagle from the Light, (Tipiyelehne Ka Awpo) chief of the non-treaty Lam'tama band, that traveled east over the Bitterroot Mountains along with Looking Glass' band to hunt buffalo, was present at the Walla Walla Council in 1855 and supported the non-treaty faction at the Lapwai Council, refused to sign the Treaty of 1855 and 1866, left his territory on Salmon River (two miles south of Corvallis) in 1875 with part of his band, and did settle down in Weiser County (Montana), joined with Shoshone Chief's Eagle's Eye. The leadership of the other Lam'tama that rested on the Salmon River was taken by old chief White Bird. Eagle From the Light didn't participate in the War of 1877 because he was too far away.
- Elaine Miles, actress best known from her role in television's Northern Exposure
- Ellis (c. 1810–1848) was the first united leader of the Nez Perce. He was the grandson of the leader Hohots Ilppilp (also known as Red Grizzly Bear), who met with Lewis and Clark.
- Five Wounds (Pahkatos Owyeen), wounded in right hand at the Battle of the Clearwater and killed in the Battle of the Big Hole
- Jack and Al Hoxie, silent film actors; mother was Nez Perce
- Jackson Sundown, war veteran and rodeo champion
- Lily Gladstone, actress; her mother is white and her father is Blackfeet and Nez Perce
- Looking Glass (younger) or ’Eelelimyeteqenin’ (also: Allalimya Takanin – "Wrapped in the wind") (c. 1832–1877), leader of the non-treaty Alpowai band and war leader, who was killed during the tribe's final battle with the US Army; his following was third and did not exceed 40 men.
- Michael Wasson, poet
- Old Chief Joseph (Tuekakas), (also: tiwíiteq'is) (c. 1785–1871), was leader of the Wallowa Band and one of the first Nez Percé converts to Christianity and vigorous advocate of the tribe's early peace with whites, father of Chief Joseph (also known as Young Joseph).
- Ollokot, (’álok'at, also known as Ollikut) (1840s–1877), younger brother of Chief Joseph, war chief of the Wallowa band, was killed while fighting at the final battle on Snake Creek, near the Bear Paw Mountains on October 4, 1877.
- Peo Peo Tholekt (piyopyóot’alikt – "Bird Alighting"), a Nez Perce warrior who fought with distinction in every battle of the Nez Perce War, wounded in the Battle of Camas Creek.
- Poker Joe, warrior and subchief; chosen trail boss and guide of the Nez Percé people following the Battle of the Big Hole, killed in the Battle of Bear Paw; half French Canadian and Nez Perce descent
- Rainbow (Wahchumyus), war leader of a non-treaty band, killed in the Battle of the Big Hole
- Red Owl (Koolkool Snehee), war leader of a non-treaty band
- Timothy (Tamootsin, 1808–1891), leader of the treaty faction of the Alpowai (or Alpowa) band of the Nez Percé, was the first Christian convert among the Nez Percé, was married to Tamer, a sister of Old Chief Joseph, who was baptized on the same day as Timothy.
- Toohoolhoolzote, was leader and tooat (medicine man (or shaman) or prophet) of the non-treaty Pikunan band; fought in the Nez Perce War after first advocating peace; died at the Battle of Bear Paw
- White Bird or Piyóopiyo x̣ayx̣áyx̣ (also: Peo-peo-hix-hiix or Peo peo Hih Hih; more correctly Peopeo Kiskiok Hihih – "White Goose") (d.1892), also referred to as White Pelican was war leader and tooat (medicine man or prophet) of the non-treaty Lamátta or Lamtáama band, belonging to Lahmatta ("area with little snow"), by which White Bird Canyon was known to the Nez Perce, his following was second in size to Joseph's, and did not exceed 50 men
- Wrapped in the Wind (’elelímyeté'qenin’/ háatyata'qanin)
- Yellow Bull or Cúuɫim maqsmáqs (also: Chuslum Moxmox), war leader of a non-treaty band
- Yellow Wolf or Hiímiin maqs maqs / Himíin maqsmáqs (also: He–Mene Mox Mox or Hemene Moxmox, wished to be called Heinmot Hihhih or In-mat-hia-hia – "White Lightning", c. 1855, died August 1935) was a Nez Perce warrior of the non-treaty Wallowa band who fought in the Nez Perce War of 1877, gunshot wound, left arm near wrist; under left eye in the Battle of the Clearwater
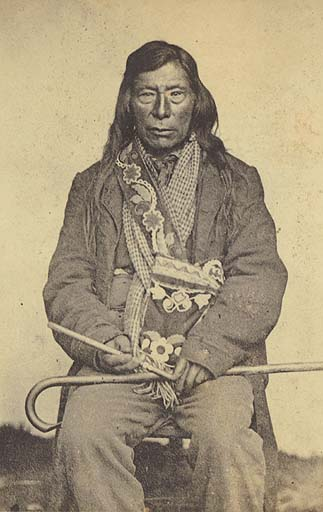
Chief Lawyer, c. 1861

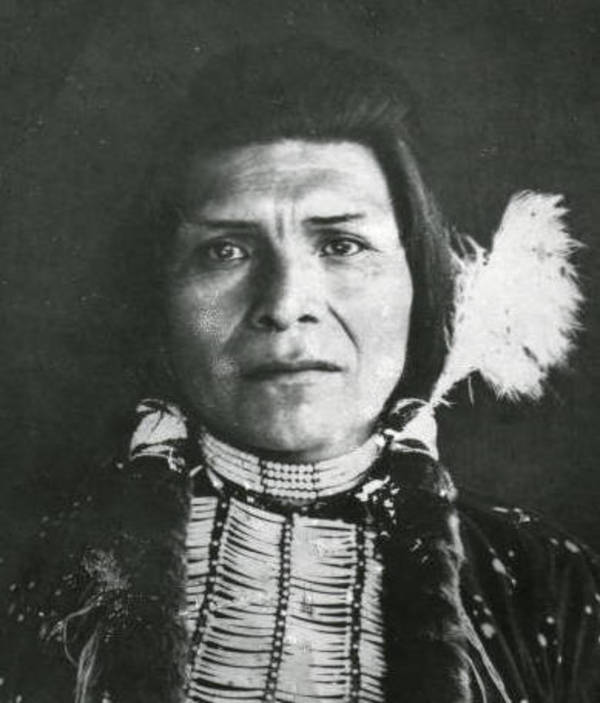
Peo Peo Tholekt (Bird Alighting), a Nez Perce warrior who helped capture the mountain howitzer at the Battle of the Big Hole

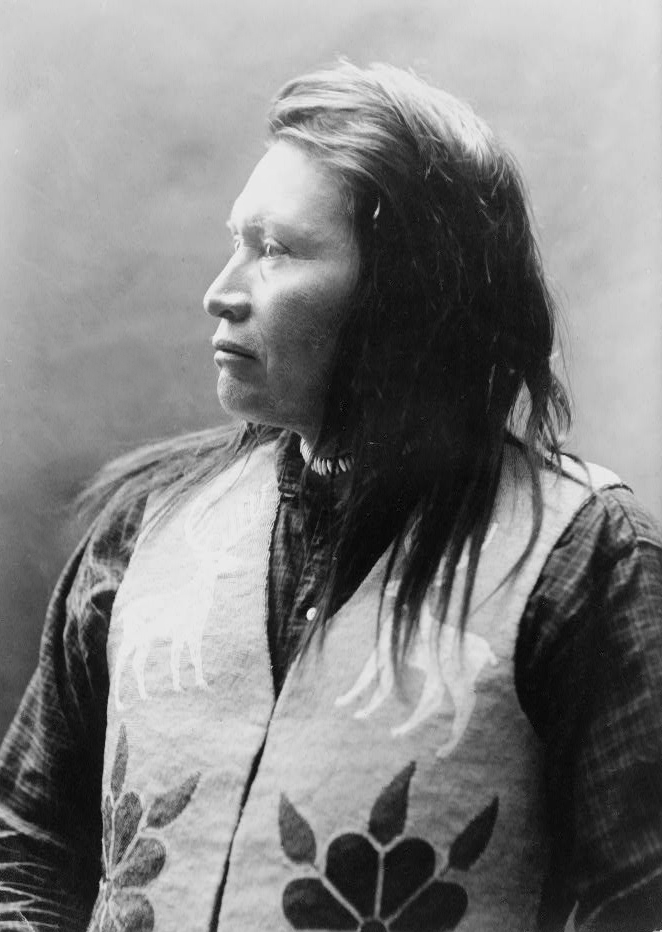
Yellow Wolf, December 30, 1909

== Eponymy ==
The Triassic gastropod Cryptaulax nezperceorum Nützel & Erwin, 2004, found on the land of the Nez Percé tribe, has been named in their honour.
