= Umatilla people =

Indigenous people of America

Umatilla
Imatalamłáma
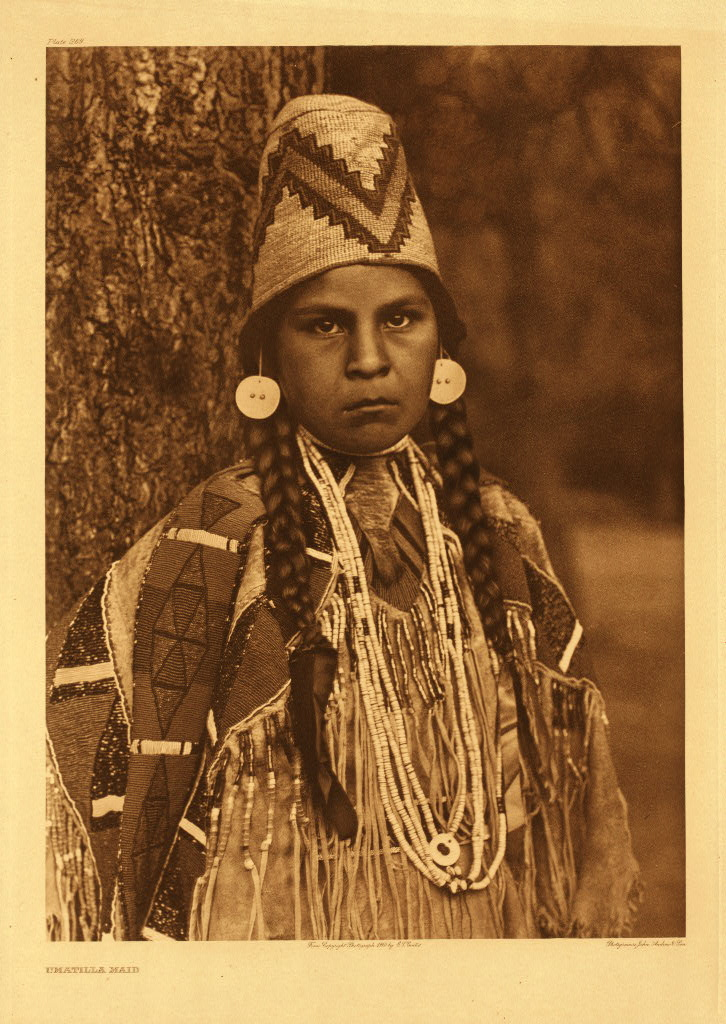
- Umatilla girl, 1911

Languages
- Umatilla

Religion
- Traditional religion, Washat, Christianity

Related ethnic groups
- Other Sahaptin peoples

The Umatilla are a Sahaptin-speaking Native American tribe who traditionally inhabited the Columbia Plateau region of the northwestern United States, along the Umatilla and Columbia rivers.

The Umatilla people are called Imatalamłáma, a Umatilla person is called Imatalamłá (with orthographic ł representing IPA /ɬ/). Some sources say that Umatilla is derived from imatilám-hlama: hlama means 'those living at' or 'people of' and there is an ongoing debate about the meaning of imatilám, but it is said to be an island in the Columbia River. B. Rigsby and N. Rude mention the village of ímatalam that was situated at the mouth of the Umatilla River and where the language was spoken. The Nez Perce refer to the Umatilla people as hiyówatalampoo (Aoki (1994:171)).

== History ==
=== Early development ===
The Umatilla nation was bordered by the Teninos (Tinaynuɫáma - "People of Tináynu") to the West and the Klickitats (X̣ʷáłx̣ʷayłáma - "Prairie People") to north, across the Columbia River. Also by their northern border were the Palouse, Wasco-Wishrams (Wasq̓ułáma - "People of Wasq̓ú"; Wɨ́šx̣amma - "People of Wɨ́šx̣aa/Wɨ́šx̣am (Spearfish)"). They had friendly Cayuse, and Walla Walla tribes to the east. Because their homeland lacked natural defenses, the Umatillas were attacked from the south by groups of Bannocks and Paiutes.

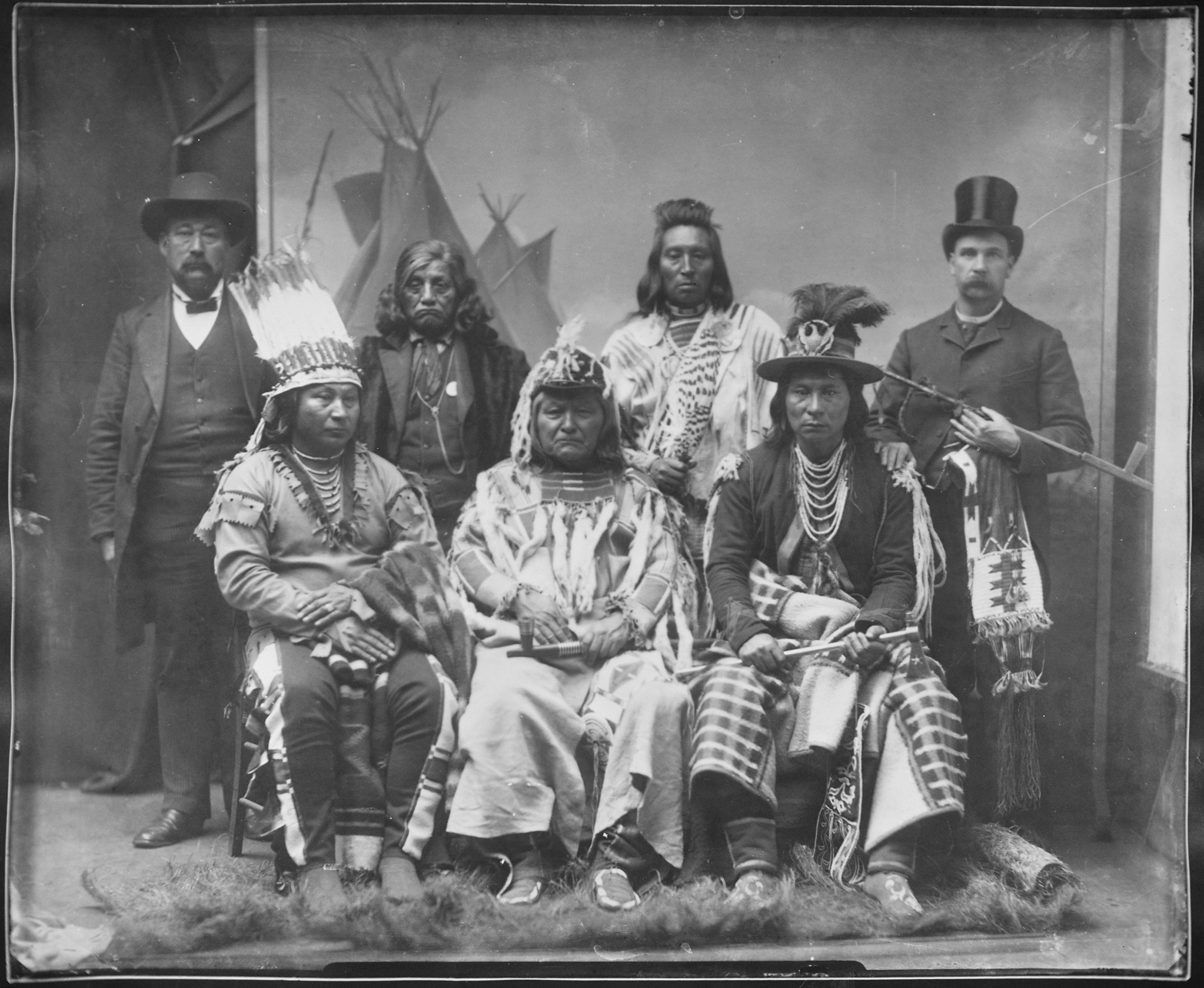
Sahaptin tribal representatives in Washington D.C. c.1890. Back row: John McBain (far left), Cayuse chief Showaway, Palouse chief Wolf Necklace, and far right, Lee Moorhouse, Umatilla Indian Agent. Front row: Umatilla chief Peo, Walla Walla chief Hamli, and Cayuse Young Chief Tauitau.

Linguistically, the Umatilla language or Imatalamłaamí Sɨ́nwit is part of the Sahaptin division of the Penutian language family — closely related to other peoples of today's Eastern Oregon, Eastern Washington, and the Idaho panhandle. These included the Nez Percé (Šíwaniš - "Stranger"), Cayuse (Wáylatpu / Wáylatpuuma - "Ryegrass People, i.e. Cayuse People"), Walla Walla (Walawalałáma - "People of Walula region along Walla Walla River"), Palouse (Paluuspamá - "People of Palus") and the Yakima (Mamačatłáma - "Yakama People"). These peoples were ravaged by smallpox and other infectious diseases contracted from European colonists during the first half of the 19th century.

In 1855 the inland Sahaptin-speaking nations were forced to surrender their historic homelands under treaty to the United States government, in exchange for territorial set-asides on reservations.

=== Reservation period ===
Today the Umatilla share land and a governmental structure with the Cayuse and the Walla Walla tribes as part of the federally recognized Confederated Tribes of the Umatilla Indian Reservation. Their reservation is located near Pendleton, Oregon and the Blue Mountains.

A number of places and geographic features have been named after the tribe, such as the Umatilla River, Umatilla County, Umatilla, Oregon, Umatilla, Florida, and Umatilla National Forest. The impoundment of the Columbia River behind the John Day Dam is called Lake Umatilla.

Map of the Umatilla Reservation with neighbouring reservations (In red)

== Notable Umatillas ==
- Donald McKay – scout and leader of the Warm Springs Indians during the Modoc War
- Shoni Schimmel – WNBA player
- Acosia Red Elk – World Champion Jingle Dress Dancer, yoga instructor

== See also ==
- Kennewick Man
