= Nez Perce language =

Sahaptian language of Northwestern USA

Nez Perce
- niimiipuutímt
- Native to: United States
- Region: Idaho
- Ethnicity: 610 Nez Perce people (2000 census)
- Native speakers: 20 (2007)
- Language family: Penutian?: Plateau Penutian; Sahaptian; Nez Perce
- Dialects: Upriver; Downriver

Language codes
- ISO 639-3: nez
- Glottolog: nezp1238
- ELP: Nez Perce

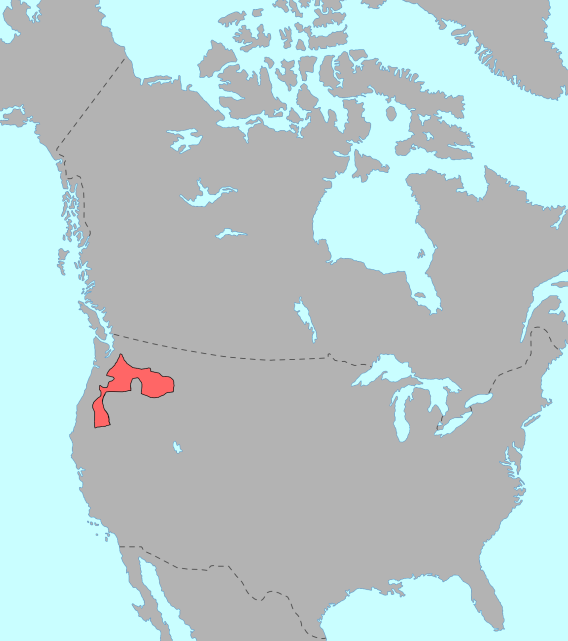
Pre-contact distribution of Plateau Penutian languages

Nez Perce, also spelled Nez Percé or called nimipuutímt (alternatively spelled nimiipuutímt, niimiipuutímt, or niimi'ipuutímt), is a Sahaptian language related to the several dialects of Sahaptin (note the spellings -ian vs. -in). Nez Perce comes from the French phrase nez percé, "pierced nose"; however, Nez Perce, who call themselves nimíipuu, meaning "the people", did not pierce their noses. This misnomer may have occurred as a result of confusion on the part of the French, as it was surrounding tribes who did so.

The Sahaptian sub-family is one of the branches of the Plateau Penutian family (which, in turn, may be related to a larger Penutian grouping). It is spoken by the Nez Perce people of the Northwestern United States.

Nez Perce is a highly endangered language. While sources differ on the exact number of fluent speakers, it is almost definitely under 100. The Nez Perce tribe is endeavoring to reintroduce the language into native usage through a language revitalization program, but (as of 2015) the future of the Nez Perce language is far from assured.

== Phonology ==
The phonology of Nez Perce includes vowel harmony (which was mentioned in Noam Chomsky & Morris Halle's The Sound Pattern of English), as well as a complex stress system described by Crook (1999).

=== Consonants ===
Consonant phonemes of Nez Perce
		Bilabial	Alveolar			Palatal	Velar		Uvular		Glottal
		Bilabial	central	sibilant	lateral	Palatal	plain	lab.	plain	lab.	Glottal
Plosive/ Affricate	plain	p	t	ts			k	(kʷ)	q	(qʷ)	ʔ
Plosive/ Affricate	ejective	pʼ	tʼ	tsʼ	tɬʼ		kʼ	(kʼʷ)	qʼ	(qʼʷ)	
Fricative				s	ɬ	( ʃ )	x		χ		h
Sonorant	plain	m	n		l	j		w			
Sonorant	glottalized	mʼ	nʼ		lʼ	jʼ		wʼ			

The sounds /kʷ kʼʷ qʷ qʼʷ/ and /ʃ/ only occur in the Downriver dialect.

=== Vowels ===
Nez Perce has an average-sized inventory of five vowels, each marked for length. Unusually for a five-vowel system, however, it lacks a mid front vowel /e/, with low front /æ/ in its place. Such an asymmetrical configuration is found in less than five percent of the languages that distinguish exactly five vowels, and among those that do display an asymmetry, the "missing" vowel is overwhelmingly more likely to be a back vowel /u/ or /o/ than front /e/. Indeed, Nez Perce's lack of a mid front vowel within a five-vowel system appears unique, and contrary to basic tendencies toward triangularity in the allocation of vowel space. A potential reason for this peculiarity is discussed in the section on vowel harmony below.

Vowel phonemes of Nez Perce
	Front	Central	Back
High	i iː		u uː
Mid			o oː
Low	æ æː ⟨e ee⟩	a aː	

Stress is marked with an acute accent ⟨á, é, í, ó, ú⟩.

==== Diphthongs ====
Nez Perce distinguishes seven diphthongs, all with phonemic length:

	Front	Central	Back
High (level)	iu̯ iːu̯		ui̯ uːi̯
Mid (rising)			oi̯ oːi̯
Low (rising)	æu̯ æːu̯ æi̯ æːi̯	au̯ aːu̯ ai̯ aːi̯	

==== Vowel harmony ====
Nez Perce displays an extensive system of vowel harmony. Vowel qualities are divided into two opposing sets, "dominant" /i a o/ and "recessive" /i æ u/. The presence of a dominant vowel causes all recessive vowels within the same phonological word to assimilate to their dominant counterpart; hence with the addition of the dominant-marked suffix /-ʔajn/:

cé·qet $\rightarrow$ cá·qatʼayn
/ˈtsæːqæt/ {} /ˈtsaːqatʼajn/
'raspberry' {} {'for a raspberry'}

With very few exceptions, therefore, phonological words may contain only vowels of the dominant or recessive set. Despite occurring in both sets, /i/ is not neutral; instead, it is either dominant or recessive depending on the morpheme in which it occurs.

This system presents a challenge to common concepts of vowel harmony, since it does not appear to be based on obvious considerations of backness, height, or tongue root position. To account for this, Katherine Nelson (2013) proposes that the two sets be considered as distinct "triangles" of vowel space, each by themselves maximally dispersed, where the dominant set is somewhat retracted (further back) in comparison to the recessive:

Recessive → dominant
	Front	Central	Back
High	i (→ i)		u → o
Low	æ → a		u → o

This dual system would simultaneously explain two apparent phonological aberrances: the absence of a mid front vowel /e/, and the fact that phonemic /i/ can be marked either as dominant or recessive. Since the three vowels of a given set are placed with regard to the other vowels of the same set, the low height of the front vowel /æ/ appears natural (that is, maximally dispersed) against its high counterparts /i u/, as in a three-vowel system such as those of Arabic and Quechua. The high front vowel /i/ meanwhile, is retracted much less in the transition from recessive to dominant - little enough that the distinction does not surface phonemically - and therefore can be placed near to the crux around which the triangle of vowel space is "tilted" by retraction.

==== Syllable structure ====
The Nez Perce syllable canon is CV(ː)(C)(C)(C)(C). That is, all syllables begin with a single consonant in the onset, followed by a vowel, which may be short or long. Coda sequences may comprise up to four consonants.

There are restrictions to the types of consonants that occur in the coda, both as single segments or in sequences. As a rule, ejective consonants never occur in the coda, and the longer the sequence, the bigger the restriction. The longest coda sequences tend to comprise morphemes. These are summarized in the following table, where ‹C'› represents any ejective consonant.

Conset	V(ː)	C1	C2	C3	C4	Example	English
any consonant	any vowel	all but /k q h Cʼ/	-			téhes /ˈtæhæs/	“ice”
any consonant	any vowel	all but /ɬ Cʼ/	all but /k q h Cʼ/	-		tax̣c /taχt͡s/	“now”
any consonant	any vowel	all but /p t k q Cʼ/	/p t ts q x j/	/t ts s x/	-	wal̓ac̓áskt /walˀaˈt͡sʼaskt/	“pony tail”
any consonant	any vowel	/p ʔ h x/	/t ts n j w s/	/p k s x q/	/t ts s/	t̓uxsks /tʼuxsks/	“I smashed with hand”

== Writing system ==
Nez Perce alphabet (Colville Confederated Tribes)
a	a·	c	c’	e	é·	h	i	í·	k	k’	l	l’	ł	ƛ	m	m’	n	n’	o
ó·	p	p’	q	q’	s	t	t’	u	ú·	w	w’	x	x̂	y	y’	ʔ			

== Grammar ==
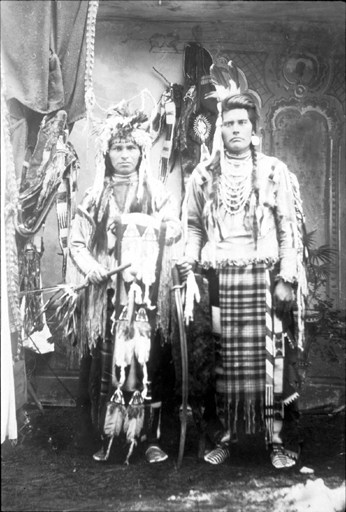
Nez Perce chiefs

As in many other indigenous languages of the Americas, a Nez Perce verb can have the meaning of an entire sentence in English. This manner of providing a great deal of information in one word is called polysynthesis. Verbal affixes provide information about the person and number of the subject and object, as well as tense and aspect (e.g. whether or not an action has been completed).

ʔew ʔilíw wee ʔinipí qaw tée ce
1/2-3.OBJ fire fly grab straight.through go.away IMPERF.PRES.SG
'I go to scoop him up in the fire'

hi tiw̓ele pááy e
3.SUBJ in.rain come PAST
'He arrived in the rain'

=== Documentation History ===
Asa Bowen Smith developed the Nez Perce grammar by adapting the missionary alphabet used in Hawaiian missions, and adding the consonants s and t. In 1840, Smith wrote the manuscript for the book Grammar of the Language of the Nez Perces Indians Formerly of Oregon, U.S.. The grammar of Nez Perce has been described in a grammar (Aoki 1973) and a dictionary (Aoki 1994) with two dissertations.

=== Case ===
Nez Perce nouns are marked for grammatical case. Nez Perce employs a three-way case-marking strategy: a transitive subject, a transitive object, and an intransitive subject are each marked differently. It is thus an example of the very rare type of tripartite languages (see morphosyntactic alignment).

Nouns in Nez Perce are marked based on how they relate to the transitivity of the verb. Subjects in a sentence with a transitive verb take the ergative suffix -nim, objects in a sentence with a transitive verb take the accusative suffix -ne, and subjects in sentences with an intransitive verb do not take a suffix.

Ergative	Accusative	Intransitive subject
suffix -nim	suffix -ne (here subject to vowel harmony, resulting in surface form -na)	
ᶍáᶍaas-nim hitwekǘxce grizzly-ERG he.is.chasing 'Grizzly is chasing me'	ʔóykalo-m titóoqan-m páaqaʔancix ᶍáᶍaas-na all-ERG people-ERG they.respect.him grizzly-ACC 'All people respect Grizzly'	ᶍáᶍaac hiwéhyem grizzly has.come 'Grizzly has come'

=== Verbal morphology ===
The Nez Perce verb encodes number (and to a lesser extent person) for one or two arguments, and also has a very rich system suffixal system encoding tense, aspect, polarity and associated motion. In addition, it has a series of hundreds of preverbs encoding instrument, posture and various unusual categories.

In particular, it has one of the richest system of periodic tense among the world's languages, including matutinal, diurnal, vesperal, nocturnal and hivernal, as illustrated in the following examples (examples from Aoki 1994: 751–752, interlinear glosses from Jacques 2023:2-3).

méytipse
méy-tip-se
MAT-eat.meal-PRS:SG
'I am having breakfast.'

halx̣patípsa
halx̣pa-típ-sa
DIU-eat.meal-PRS:SG
'I am eating lunch.'

kulewí·-tip-se
VESP-eat.meal-PRS:SG
'I am eating supper.'

te·w-c͗íq-ce
NOCT-talk-PRS:SG
'I am talking at night.'

ʔelíw-tin̉k-ce
HIB-die-PRS:SG
'I am starving in winter.'

The Nez Perce verb has three different ways of expressing simulative 'pretend': a suffix -tay, the combination of the reflexive indexation prefix with the 'by mouth' instrumental preverb, and the simulative -né·wi suffix.

hip-táy-ca
eat-SIMUL-PRS:SG
'I am pretending to eat.'

ʔin-ú·-tin’k-se
REFL:1SG-by.mouth-die-PRS:SG
'I pretend to be dead.'

ʔipn-u·-wepcux-né·wi-se
REFL:3SG-by.mouth-smart-SIMUL-PRS:SG
'He pretends to be smart.' (Aoki 1994:479–480)

=== Word order ===
The word order in Nez Perce is quite flexible and serves to introduce information on the topic and focus of a sentence.

Verb–subject–object word order

kii pée-ten’we-m-e qíiw-ne ’iceyéeye-nm
this 3→3-talk-CSL-PAST old.man-OBJ coyote-ERG
'Now the coyote talked to the old man'

Subject–verb–object word order

Kaa háatya-nm páa-’nahna-m-a ’iceyéeye-ne
and wind-ERG 3→3-carry-CSL-PAST coyote-OBJ
'And the wind carried coyote here'

Subject–object–verb word order

Kawó’ kii háama-pim ’áayato-na pée-’nehnen-e
then this husband-ERG woman-OBJ 3→3-take.away-PAST
'Now then the husband took the woman away'

== In media ==
The 2010 film Meek's Cutoff features a Cayuse man (played by Rod Rondeaux) who speaks the Downriver dialect of Nez Perce.

== Language learning materials ==
=== Dictionaries and vocabulary ===
- Aoki, Haruo. (1994). Nez Perce dictionary. University of California publications in linguistics (Vol. 112). Berkeley: University of California Press. ISBN 0-520-09763-7.
- "Nez Perce Literature and vocabulary". Indigenous Peoples' Literature.
- McBeth, Sue. "Nez Perce-English Dictionary samples".
- "Nez Perce-English Vocabulary" (PDF). Nez Perce National Historical Park. Archived from the original (PDF) on September 25, 2013.
- Morvillo, Anthony (1895). A Dictionary of the Numípu Or Nez Perce Language. St. Ignatius' Mission Print, Montana.
- "Nez Perce Language and the Nez Perce Indian Tribe (Nimipu, Nee-me-poo, Chopunnish, Sahaptin)". native-languages.org.

=== Grammar ===
- Aoki, Haruo. (1965). Nez Perce grammar. University of California, Berkeley.
- Aoki, Haruo. (1970). Nez Perce grammar. University of California publications in linguistics (Vol. 62). Berkeley: University of California Press. ISBN 0-520-09259-7. (Reprinted 1973, California Library Reprint series).
- Missionary in the Society of Jesus in the Rocky Mountains (1891). A Numipu or Nez-Perce grammar. Desmet, Idaho: Indian Boys' Press. ISBN 9780665175299.

=== Texts and courses ===
- "Nimipuutimt Calendar and Nez Perce Tribe Language Program". Archived from the original on 2013-09-23.
- Aoki, Haruo. (1979). Nez Perce texts. University of California publications in linguistics (Vol. 90). Berkeley: University of California Press. ISBN 0-520-09593-6., 2, 3
- Aoki, Haruo; & Whitman, Carmen. (1989). Titwáatit: (Nez Perce Stories). Anchorage: National Bilingual Materials Development Center, University of Alaska. ISBN 0-520-09593-6. (Material originally published in Aoki 1979).
- "Nez Perce Language Courses" (Department of Foreign Languages and Literatures and American Indian Studies Program, University of Idaho).
- Rockliff, J. A. (1915). "The Life of Jesus Christ from the Four Gospels in the Nez Perce Language".
- "Nez Perce language - Audio Bible stories and lessons". Global Recordings Network.
- "Nez Perce Language Courses" (Department of Foreign Languages and Literatures and American Indian Studies Program, University of Idaho).
- "Nez Perce Literature and vocabulary". Indigenous Peoples' Literature.
- Watters, Mari. (1990). Nez Perce tapes and texts. [5 audio cassettes & 1 booklet]. Moscow, Idaho: Mari Watters Productions, Upward Bound, College of Education, University of Idaho.
