= Klamath language =

Extinct Plateau Penutian language

Klamath
- Klamath–Modoc, Lutuamian
- ?ewksgiism hemkangs, Maqlaqsyals
- Native to: United States
- Region: Southern Oregon and northern California
- Ethnicity: 170 Klamath and Modoc (2000 census)
- Extinct: 2003, with the death of Neva Eggsman
- Revival: 2019
- Language family: Penutian?: Plateau (Penutian); Klamath
- Dialects: Klamath; Modoc

Language codes
- ISO 639-3: kla
- Glottolog: klam1254
- ELP: Klamath-Modoc

Klamath (/ˈklæməθ/), also Klamath–Modoc (/ˈklæməθ ˈmoʊdɒk/) and historically Lutuamian (Note: From the Achumawi word for the speakers of this language, Lutuami, meaning 'lake dwellers'.) (/ˌluːtuˈæmiən/), is a Plateau Penutian language spoken around Klamath Lake in what is now southern Oregon and northern California. It is the traditional language of the Klamath and Modoc peoples, each of whom spoke a dialect of the language. By 1998, only one native speaker remained, and by 2003, this last fluent Klamath speaker who was living in Chiloquin, Oregon, was 92 years old. As of 2006 there were no fluent native speakers of either the Klamath or Modoc dialects; however, as of 2019, revitalization efforts are underway with the goal of creating new speakers.

Klamath is a member of the Plateau Penutian language family, which is in turn a branch of the proposed Penutian language family. Like other proposed Penutian languages, Plateau Penutian languages are rich in ablaut, much like Indo-European and Afro-Asiatic languages. Further evidence for this classification includes some consonant correspondences between Klamath and other alleged Penutian languages. For example, the Proto-Yokuts retroflexes */ʈ ʈʼ/ correspond to Klamath /tʃ tʃʼ/, and the Proto-Yokuts dentals */t̪ t̪ʰ t̪ʼ/ correspond to the Klamath alveolars /t tʰ tʼ/.

== Phonology ==
=== Vowels ===
	Front		Back	
	short	long	short	long
Close	i ~ ɪ	iː	u ~ ɔ	
Mid	ɛ ~ æ		u ~ ɔ	oː
Open	ɛ ~ æ	æː	ə ~ ɑ	ɑː

=== Consonants ===
		Bilabial	Alveolar		Palatal (-alveolar)	Velar	Uvular	Glottal
		Bilabial	median	lateral	Palatal (-alveolar)	Velar	Uvular	Glottal
Plosive/ Affricate	tenuis	p	t		tʃ	k	q	ʔ
Plosive/ Affricate	aspirated	pʰ	tʰ		tʃʰ	kʰ	qʰ	
Plosive/ Affricate	ejective	pʼ	tʼ		tʃʼ	kʼ	qʼ	
Fricative			s					h
Sonorant	voiced	m	n	l	j	w		
Sonorant	voiceless	m̥	n̥	l̥	ȷ̊	w̥		
Sonorant	glottalic	mˀ	nˀ	lˀ	jˀ	wˀ		

Plosives in Klamath, aside from /ʔ/, come in triplets of unaspirated, aspirated, and ejective sounds. Sonorant triplets are voiced, voiceless, and glottalized sounds.

Most consonants can be geminated. The fricative /s/ is an exception, and there is evidence suggesting this is a consequence of a recent sound change. Albert Samuel Gatschet recorded geminated /sː/ in the late 19th century, but this sound was consistently recorded as degeminated /s/ by M. A. R. Barker in the 1960s. Sometime after Gatschet recorded the language and before Barker did the same, */sː/ may have degeminated into /s/.

== Orthography ==
Klamath alphabet
Spelling	a	aa	b	c	cʼ	d	e	ee	g	ɢ	h	i	ii	j	k	kʼ	l	L	lʼ	m	M	mʼ	n	N	nʼ	o	oo	p	pʼ	q	qʼ	s	s?	t	t’	w	W	w’	y	Y	yʼ	?
Phoneme	ə	ɑː	p	tʃʰ	tʃʼ	t	ɛ	æː	k	q	h	ɪ	iː	tʃ	kʰ	kʼ	l	l̥	lˀ	m	m̥	mˀ	n	n̥	nˀ	ɔ	oː	pʰ	pʼ	qʰ	qʼ	s	sˀ	tʰ	t’	w	w̥	wˀ	j	ȷ̊	jˀ	ʔ

== Syntax ==
Klamath word order is conditioned by pragmatics. There is no clearly defined verb phrase or noun phrase. Alignment is nominative–accusative, with nominal case marking also distinguishing adjectives from nouns. Many verbs obligatorily classify an absolutive case. There are directive and applicative constructions.

== See also ==
- List of extinct languages of North America

== Bibliography ==
- Barker, M. A. R. (1963a). Klamath Texts. University of California Publications in Linguistics. Vol. 30. University of California Press.
- ————— (1963b). Klamath Dictionary. University of California Publications in Linguistics. Vol. 31. University of California Press.
- ————— (1964). Klamath Grammar. University of California Publications in Linguistics. Vol. 32. University of California Press.
- Barker, Philip (1959). The Klamath language (Thesis). University of California, Berkeley.
- Bauer, Laurie (2007). The Linguistics Student's Handbook (1st ed.). Oxford University Press. ISBN 978-0-7486-2758-5. OCLC 190872469.
- Blevins, Juliette (July 1993). "Klamath Laryngeal Phonology". International Journal of American Linguistics. 59 (3): 237–279. JSTOR 1265523.
- ————— (July 2004). "Klamath Sibilant Degemination: Implications of a Recent Sound Change". International Journal of American Linguistics. 70 (3). The University of Chicago Press: 279–289. doi:10.1086/425602. JSTOR 10.1086/425602.
- Chen, David W. (April 5, 1998). "BLACKBOARD: LOST LANGUAGES; Kuskokwim Not Spoken Here". New York Times. Archived from the original on Jan 13, 2014.
- de Angulo, Jaime (1931). The Lutuami language (Klamath-Modoc). Société des Américanistes. OCLC 27210767.
- Dupris, Joseph (2019). "maqlaqsyalank hemyeega: Goals and expectations of Klamath-Modoc revitalization". Language Documentation & Conservation. 13: 155–196. hdl:10125/24851. ISSN 1934-5275.
- Golla, Victor (2011). California Indian Languages. Berkeley/Los Angeles, California: University of California Press. ISBN 978-0-520-26667-4.
- Haynes, Erin F. (2004). "Obstacles facing tribal language programs in Warm Springs, Klamath, and Grand Ronde" (PDF). Coyote Papers. 13: 87–102. hdl:10150/126636. ISSN 0894-4539. Archived from the original (PDF) on 2010-07-09.
- Lane, Valeree (November 28, 2017). "Chiloquin man helps Klamath Tribal members embrace first language". Herald and News.
- Mauldin, William S. (April 17, 1998). "Yale linguists part of effort to save dying languages". The Yale Herald. Archived from the original on Dec 3, 2008.
- Pease, Robert W. (1965). "Modoc County". University of California Publications in Geography. 17. Berkeley and Los Angeles, California: University of California Press. ISSN 0068-6441. OCLC 3714154.
- Rude, Noel (1987). "Some Sahaptian-Klamath grammatical correspondences". Kansas Working Papers in Linguistics. 12: 67–83. doi:10.17161/KWPL.1808.511. hdl:1808/511.
- ————— (1988). "Semantic and pragmatic objects in Klamath". In William Shipley (ed.). In Honor of Mary Haas: From the Haas Festival Conference on Native American Linguistics. Berlin: Mouton de Gruyter. pp. 651–73. OCLC 18715235.
- ————— (1991). "Verbs to promotional suffixes in Sahaptian and Klamath". In Elizabeth C. Traugott; Bernd Heine (eds.). Approaches to Grammaticalization. Typological Studies in Language. Vol. 19. New York and Amsterdam: John Benjamins Publishing Company. pp. 185–199. doi:10.1075/tsl.19.2.10rud.

=== Online texts ===
- Coville, Frederick Vernon (1897). Notes on the plants used by the Klamath Indians of Oregon. Includes Klamath language plant names.
- Gatschet, Albert S. (1890). The Klamath Indians of southwestern Oregon. ISBN 9780665527449.
- Gatschet, Albert S. (1880). The numeral adjective in the Klamath language of southern Oregon. ISBN 9780665329326.
- Gatschet, Albert S. (1878). Sketch of the Klamath language of Southern Oregon. ISBN 9780665328503.
