= Sahaptin language =

Sahaptian language in the United States

Sahaptin
- Ichiskiin
- Yakama: Ichishkíin; Umatilla: Čiškíin
- Native to: United States
- Region: Washington, Oregon, and Idaho
- Ethnicity: 10,000 Sahaptins (1977)
- Native speakers: 100–125 (2007)
- Language family: Penutian?: Plateau Penutian; Sahaptian; Sahaptin
- Dialects: Walla Walla (Northeast); Yakama (Northwest); Umatilla (Southern)

Language codes
- ISO 639-3: Variously: uma – Umatilla waa – Walla Walla yak – Yakama tqn – Tenino
- Glottolog: saha1240
- ELP: Sahaptin
- Map of Plateau Penutian languages, including Sahaptin

- Sahaptin is classified as Severely Endangered by the UNESCO Atlas of the World's Languages in Danger.

Sahaptin (suh-HAP-tin), also called Ichishkiin (ih-chis-KEEN; Umatilla: Čiškíin, Yakama: Ichishkíin Sɨ́nwit), is one of the two-language Sahaptian branch of the Plateau Penutian family spoken in a section of the northwestern plateau along the Columbia River and its tributaries in southern Washington, northern Oregon, and southwestern Idaho, in the United States; the other language is Nez Perce (Niimi'ipuutímt).

Sahaptin is spoken by various tribes of the Washington Reservations; Yakama, Warm Springs, Umatilla; and also spoken in many smaller communities such as Celilo, Oregon.

The Yakama Nation tribal cultural resources program has been promoting the use of their traditional name of the language, Ichishkíin Sɨ́nwit ('this language'), instead of the Salish-derived name Sahaptin.

== Name ==
Sahaptin is typically known as Ichiskiin in its various dialects. In the Yakama dialect, it is called Ichishkíin Sɨ́nwit, spelled variously Ichishkíin, Íchishkin, Íchishkink, or Chishkíin. In the Umatilla dialect, it is called Čiškíin or Ičiškíin.

The words Sahaptin, Shahaptin, and Sahaptian are derived from the Columbia-Moses name for the Nez Perce, sħáptənəxʷ. Cognates appear in other Interior Salishan languages, such as Okanagan sʕaptnx 'Nez Perce' or Spokane saʕáptni 'Nez Perce', indictating the ancient age of the ethnonym. The name Sahaptin has also been spelled "Shahaptin", "Sahapten", "Shahaptian", and "Shawpatin".

The first usage of the word "Sahaptin" dates to 1811, in the journal of fur trader David Thompson, who wrote of the "Chief of all the Shawpatin Tribes", referring to the Nez Perce. At the time, "Sahaptin" (and variants) was used to refer to the Nez Perce, while "Walla Walla" was used to refer to the Sahaptin-speaking peoples. Alexander Ross visited a large camp on the Walla Walla River later that year, identifying "the Walla-Wallas, the Shaw Haptens, and the Cajouses". In 1844, Horatio Hale wrote of the "Sahaptin or Nez-Perces" language and the "Walawala" language. At the same time, the Snake River was also sometimes called the Sahaptin River, because it led from the Columbia River to the country of the Nez Perce.

In the 1960s, the name "Sahaptin" was used by linguists, but it was rare for Sahaptin speakers to even be aware of the term. Most speakers used the terms Ichishkínk (Yakama) or Chishkín (Walla Walla and Umatilla), which mean literally "in this way/manner".

== Dialects ==
In the Handbook of North American Indians, Sahaptin was split in the following dialects and dialect clusters:

- Sahaptin
  - Northern Sahaptin
    - Northwest cluster
      - Klikatat
      - Taitnapam (Upper Cowlitz)
      - Upper Nisqually (Mishalpam)
      - Yakima
      - Pshwanwapam
    - Northeast cluster
      - Wanapum
      - Palouse
      - Lower Snake River
      - Chamnapam
      - Wauyukma
      - Naxiyampam
      - Walla Walla (Waluulapam)
  - Southern Sahaptin (Columbia River dialects)
    - Umatilla
    - Rock Creek
    - John Day
    - Celilo (Wyampam)
    - Tenino
    - Tygh Valley

== Phonology ==
The charts of consonants and vowels below are used in the Yakima Sahaptin (Ichishkiin) language:

=== Consonants ===
		Bilabial	Dental/Alveolar			(Alveolo-) Palatal	Velar		Uvular		Glottal
		Bilabial	plain	sibilant	lateral	(Alveolo-) Palatal	plain	labial	plain	labial	Glottal
Plosive/ Affricate	tenuis	p ⟨p⟩	t̪ ⟨t⟩	ts ⟨ts⟩	tɬ ⟨tɬ⟩	tʃ ⟨ch⟩	k ⟨k⟩	kʷ ⟨kw⟩	q ⟨ḵ⟩	qʷ ⟨ḵw⟩	ʔ ⟨ʼ⟩
Plosive/ Affricate	ejective	pʼ ⟨pʼ⟩	t̪ʼ ⟨tʼ⟩	tsʼ ⟨tsʼ⟩	tɬʼ ⟨tɬʼ⟩	tʃʼ ⟨chʼ⟩	kʼ ⟨kʼ⟩	kʷʼ ⟨kwʼ⟩	qʼ ⟨ḵʼ⟩	qʷʼ ⟨ḵwʼ⟩	ʔ ⟨ʼ⟩
Fricative				s ⟨s⟩	ɬ ⟨ɬ⟩	ʃ ⟨sh⟩	x ⟨x⟩	xʷ ⟨xw⟩	χ ⟨x̠⟩	χʷ ⟨x̠w⟩	h ⟨h⟩
Sonorant		m ⟨m⟩	n ⟨n⟩		l ⟨l⟩	j ⟨y⟩		w ⟨w⟩			

=== Vowels ===
	Front		Central		Back	
	short	long	short	long	short	long
Close	i	iː	ɨ		u	uː
Open			a	aː		

Vowels can also be accented (e.g. /á/).

== Orthography ==
See Yakima practical alphabet.

== Grammar ==
There are published grammars, a recent dictionary, and a corpus of published texts.

Sahaptin has a split ergative syntax, with direct-inverse voicing and several applicative constructions.

The ergative case inflects third-person nominals only when the direct object is first- or second-person (the examples below are from the Umatilla dialect):

i- q̓ínu -šana yáka paanáy 3.NOM- see -ASP bear 3SG.ACC 'the bear saw him'	i- q̓ínu -šana =aš yáka -nɨm 3.NOM- see -ASP =1SG bear -ERG 'the bear saw me'

The direct-inverse contrast can be elicited with examples such as the following. In the inverse, the transitive direct object is coreferential with the subject in the preceding clause.

Direct	Inverse
wínš i- q̓ínu -šana wapaanłá -an ku i- ʔíƛ̓iyawi -ya paanáy man 3.NOM- see -ASP grizzly -ACC and 3.NOM- kill -PST 3SG.ACC 'the man saw the grizzly and he killed it'	wínš i- q̓ínu -šana wapaanłá -an ku pá- ʔiƛ̓iyawi -ya man 3.NOM- see -ASP grizzly -ACC and INV- kill -PST 'the man saw the grizzly and it killed him'

The inverse (marked by the verbal prefix pá-) retains its transitive status, and a patient nominal is case marked accusative.

ku pá- ʔiƛ̓iyawi -ya wínš -na
and INV- kill -PST man -ACC
'and it killed the man' (= 'and the man was killed by it')

A semantic inverse is also marked by the same verbal prefix pá-.

Direct	Inverse
q̓ínu -šana =maš see -ASP =1SG/2SG 'I saw you'	pá- q̓inu -šana =nam INV- see -ASP =2SG 'you saw me'

In Speech Act Participant (SAP) and third-person transitive involvement, direction marking is as follows:

Direct	Inverse
á- q̓inu -šana =aš paanáy OBV- see -ASP =1SG 3SG.ACC 'I saw him/her/it'	i- q̓ínu -šana =aš pɨ́nɨm 3.NOM- see -ASP =1SG 3.ERG 'he/she/it saw me'

== See also ==
- Sahaptian languages
- Sahaptin people
- Cayuse
- Palus (tribe)
- Umatilla (tribe)
- Walla Walla (tribe)
- Yakama
