= Sahaptian languages =

Plateau Penutian language branch of US

Sahaptian
- Geographic distribution: Pacific Northwest
- Linguistic classification: Penutian?: Plateau Penutian; Sahaptian
- Subdivisions: Nez Perce; Sahaptin

Language codes
- Glottolog: saha1239
- Sahaptian among Plateau Penutian languages

Sahaptian (also Sahaptianic, Sahaptin, Shahaptian) is a two-language branch of the Plateau Penutian family spoken by Native American peoples in the Columbia Plateau region of Washington, Oregon, and Idaho in the northwestern United States.

The terms Sahaptian (the family) and Sahaptin (the language) have often been confused and used interchangeably in the literature.

== Family division ==
Sahaptian includes two languages:

1. Nez Perce (Niimiʼipuutímt)
2. Sahaptin

Nez Perce has two principal dialects, Upper and Lower. Sahaptin has somewhat greater internal diversity, with its main dialects being Umatilla and Yakama.

Noel Rude's (2012) classification of Sahaptian is as follows.

- Proto-Sahaptian
  - Nez Perce
  - Sahaptin
    - Columbia River dialect
    - Northern dialect
      - Northwest dialect
      - Northeast dialect

== Proto-language ==
Proto-Sahaptian
- Reconstruction of: Sahaptian languages

Work on Proto-Sahaptian reconstruction has been undertaken by Aoki (1962) and Noel Rude (2006, 2012).

Proto-Sahaptian consonants:

		Bilabial	Alveolar			Post- alveolar	Velar		Uvular		Glottal
		Bilabial	plain	lateral	central	Post- alveolar	plain	labialized	plain	labialized	Glottal
Stop/Affricate		p	t	t͡ɬ	t͡s	t͡ʃ	k	kʷ	q	qʷ	ʔ
Ejective		p’	t’	t͡ɬʼ	t͡sʼ	t͡ʃʼ	kʼ	kʷʼ	qʼ	qʷʼ	
Fricative				ɬ	s	ʃ	x	xʷ	χ	χʷ	h
Sonorant	plain	m	n	l		j		w			
Sonorant	glottalized	mˀ	nˀ	lˀ		jˀ		wˀ			

Proto-Sahaptian vowels:

	front	central	back
high	i	ɨ	u
mid			o
low	æ		ɑ

== Bibliography ==
- Aoki, Haruo. 1962. Nez Perce and Northern Sahaptin: A binary comparison. International Journal of American Linguistics 28(3). 172–182.
- Aoki, Haruo (1963). On Sahaptian-Klamath Linguistic Affiliations. International Journal of American Linguistics 29, no. 2: 107–112.
- Aoki, Haruo (1966). Nez Percé vowel harmony and proto-Sahaptian vowels. Language, 42, 759-767.
- Aoki, Haruo (1970). Nez Percé grammar. University of California publications in linguistics (Vol. 62). Berkeley: University of California Press. ISBN 0-520-09259-7.
- Mithun, Marianne (1999). The languages of Native North America. Cambridge: Cambridge University Press. ISBN 0-521-23228-7 (hbk); ISBN 0-521-29875-X.
- Rigsby, Bruce (1965). Continuity and change in Sahaptian vowel systems. International Journal of American Linguistics, 31, 306-311.
- Rigsby, Bruce; & Silverstein, Michael (1969). Nez Percé vowels and proto-Sahaptian vowel harmony. Language, 45, 45-59.
- Rude, Noel. (2012). Reconstructing Proto-Sahaptian Sounds. University of British Columbia Working Papers in Linguistics, Vol. 32, pp. 292–324. Papers for the Forty-seventh International Conference on Salish and Neighbouring Languages, Cranbrook, British Columbia, Canada, August 3–5, 2012, edited by Joel Dunham, John Lyon & Natalie Weber.
