= Plateau Penutian languages =

Subgroup within the hypothetical Penutian language family

Plateau Penutian
- Shahapwailutan, Lepitan
- Geographic distribution: Pacific Northwest
- Linguistic classification: Penutian?: Plateau Penutian
- Subdivisions: Klamath–Modoc †; Molala †; Sahaptian

Language codes
- Glottolog: None
- Pre-contact distribution of Plateau Penutian languages

Plateau Penutian (also Shahapwailutan, Lepitan, Plateau) is a family of languages spoken in northern California, reaching through central-western Oregon to northern Washington and central-northern Idaho. The family is accepted by the linguist Lyle Campbell.

== Family division ==
Plateau Penutian is hypothesized to consist of four languages:

- Plateau Penutian
  - Klamath † (a.k.a. Klamath-Modoc, Lutuami, Lutuamian)
  - Molala †
  - Sahaptian
    - Nez Percé
    - Sahaptin

== History ==
Plateau Penutian, as originally proposed, was one branch of the hypothetical Penutian phylum as proposed by Edward Sapir. The original proposal also included Cayuse (which was grouped with Molala into a Waiilatpuan branch); however, this language has little documentation and that which is documented is inadequately recorded. Thus, the status of Cayuse within Penutian (or any other genealogical relation for that matter) may very well forever remain unclassified.

The Sahaptian grouping of Sahaptin and Nez Percé has long been uncontroversial. There is evidence in support of a connection between Klamath (a.k.a. Klamath-Modoc) and Sahaptian. Howard Berman also provides evidence that would include Molala within Plateau Penutian.

Appraisals of the Penutian hypothesis in the 1990s find Plateau Penutian to be "well supported", with DeLancey & Golla cautiously stating "while all subgroupings at this stage of Penutian research must be considered provisional, several linkages show considerable promise" (Campbell likewise mentions similar caveats). Other researchers have pointed out similarities between Plateau Penutian and the Maiduan family, although this proposal is still not completely demonstrated. A connection with Uto-Aztecan has also been suggested. The Glottolog classification, favored by many linguistic typologists but considered too conservative by some, disregards Plateau Penutian entirely.

=== Computational analyses ===
A study published in 2013 using an automated computational analysis (ASJP 4) of 40 basic vocabulary items resulted in languages from Plateau Penutian showing similarities that could be interpreted as genealogical cohesion. However, when describing the method, the authors of the study also concede that similarities may be due to borrowings and areal diffusion. Moreover, the use of automated methods for establishing genealogical connections is controversial, with many historical linguistics still favouring analyses using the comparative method, which places high importance on morphological similarities, especially when found in irregularities (e.g. English good-better-best, German gut-besser-best, Icelandic góður-betri-bestur).

== Vocabulary ==
Below is a comparison of selected basic vocabulary items in Proto-Sahaptian, Klamath, and Molala †.

Abbreviations

- S = Sahaptian
- N = Nez Percé

gloss	Proto-Sahaptian	Klamath	Molala
head	S łamtɨ́x̣	nʼo	laʔwi
hair		lag̣	tałimt
eye		lolb	tuːns
ear		momʼoˑwč	taːps
nose	*núšnu	psi	piłs
tooth		dot	taʔnf
tongue		baˑwč	aʔpaːws
mouth	S ɨ́m	som	similq
hand		nʼep	teːs
foot		peč	taylaks
meat	S nɨkʷɨ́t	čʼoleˑk	neːwit
blood	N kikeʔt	ǰeg̣le	ałp
bone	*pípš	qaqʼo	pupt
person	*tenén	maqlag̣	
name	N weʔnikt	seˑss	hastu(ː)qs
dog	N cq̓ám-qal	wač̓aˑkʼ	saka(ʔ)
fish		kyem	
louse	N hasas 'nit, louse egg'	kʼoY	
tree	N tewlikt	g̣oˑ	
leaf		tʼapq	
flower		leˑw	
water	*kéweš; N kúus	ʔambo	uq-n-s
fire		lolog̣	teːc
stone		qday	tqaʔnt
earth		g̣eˑla	laŋs
road	*ʔɨškɨ́t	sdo	
eat	N ké-		p’aʔst 's/he is eating'
die	*ƛaʔyáwi/*ƛʔayáwi	g̣leg (sg.); čʼoˑqʼ (pl.)	
I		ni	ina
you		ʔi	kiː

== Sources ==
- Campbell, Lyle (1997). American Indian languages: The historical linguistics of Native America. New York: Oxford University Press. ISBN 0-19-509427-1.
- Campbell, Lyle; & Mithun, Marianne (Eds.). (1979). The languages of native America: Historical and comparative assessment. Austin: University of Texas Press.
- DeLancey, Scott; Golla, Victor (1997). "The Penutian hypothesis: Retrospect and prospect". International Journal of American Linguistics. 63: 171–202.
- Goddard, Ives (Ed.). (1996). Languages. Handbook of North American Indians (W. C. Sturtevant, General Ed.) (Vol. 17). Washington, D. C.: Smithsonian Institution. ISBN 0-16-048774-9.
- Goddard, Ives. (1999). Native languages and language families of North America (rev. and enlarged ed. with additions and corrections). [Map]. Lincoln, NE: University of Nebraska Press (Smithsonian Institution). (Updated version of the map in Goddard 1996). ISBN 0-8032-9271-6.
- Mithun, Marianne. (1999). The languages of Native North America. Cambridge: Cambridge University Press. ISBN 0-521-23228-7 (hbk); ISBN 0-521-29875-X.
- Rude, Noel. (1987). "Some Sahaptian-Klamath grammatical correspondences." Kansas Working Papers in Linguistics, 12:67-83.
- Rude, Noel (2000). "Some Uto-Aztecan-Plateau Grammatical Comparisons". In Casad, Eugene H.; Willet, Thomas L. (eds.). Uto-Aztecan: Structural, Temporal, and Geographic Perspectives: Papers in Memory of Wick R. Miller by the Friends of Uto-Aztecan. Hermosillo, Sonora, México: Editorial UniSon. pp. 309–318.
- Sapir, Edward. (1929). Central and North American languages. In The encyclopædia britannica: A new survey of universal knowledge (14 ed.) (Vol. 5, pp. 138–141). London: The Encyclopædia Britannica Company, Ltd.
