= Sutter Buttes =

Lava domes in Sacramento Valley, California

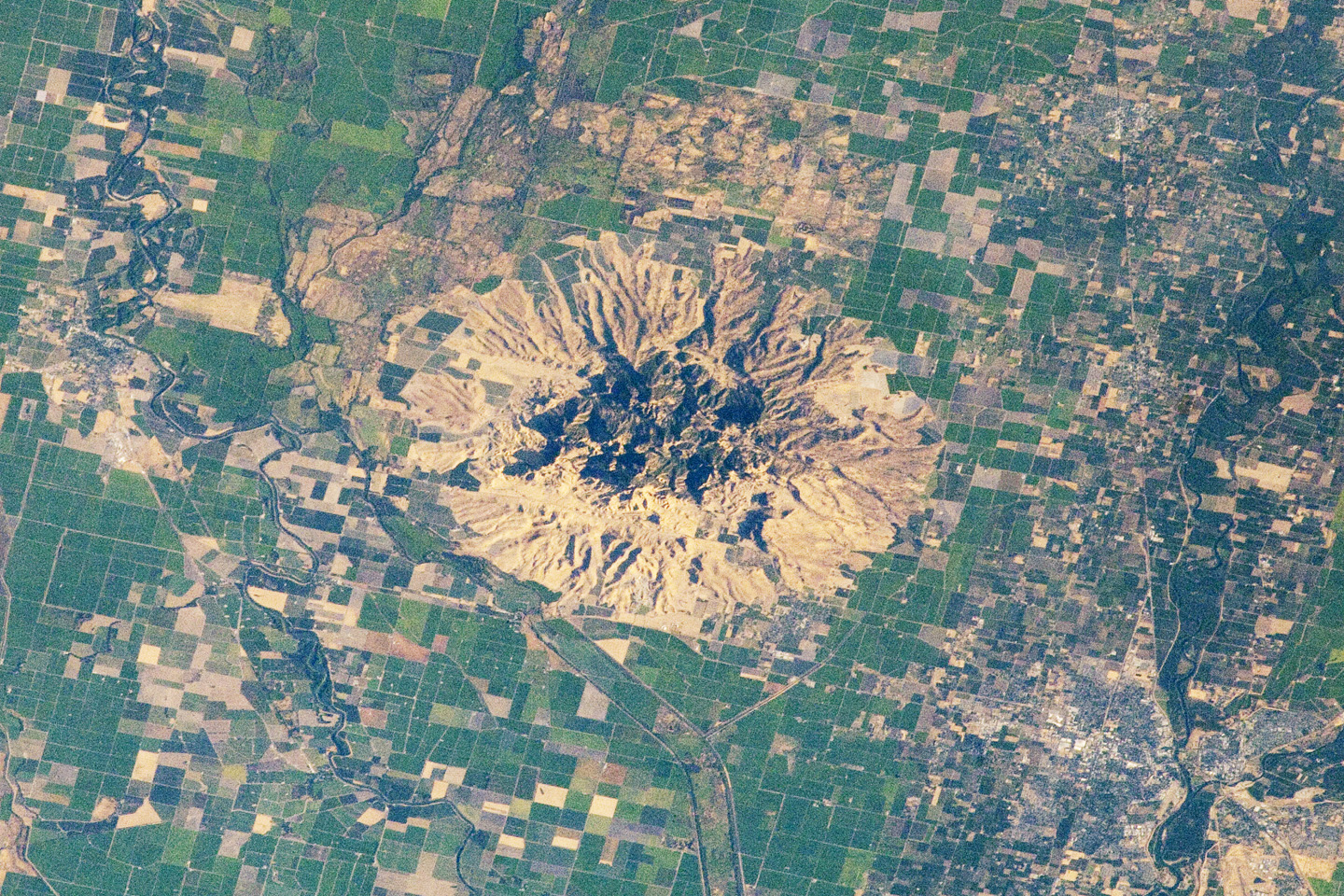
- Bird's eye view of the Sutter Buttes, rising over the town of Yuba City, California

Highest point
- Peak: South Butte
- Elevation: 2,122 ft (647 m)
- Prominence: 2,050 ft (625 m)
- Listing: California county high points 56th
- Coordinates: 39°12′21″N 121°49′13″W

Geography
- Location within California Location within the United States
- Location: Sutter County, California, U.S.
- Region: Sacramento Valley
- Topo map: USGS Sutter Buttes

Geology
- Rock type: volcanic neck

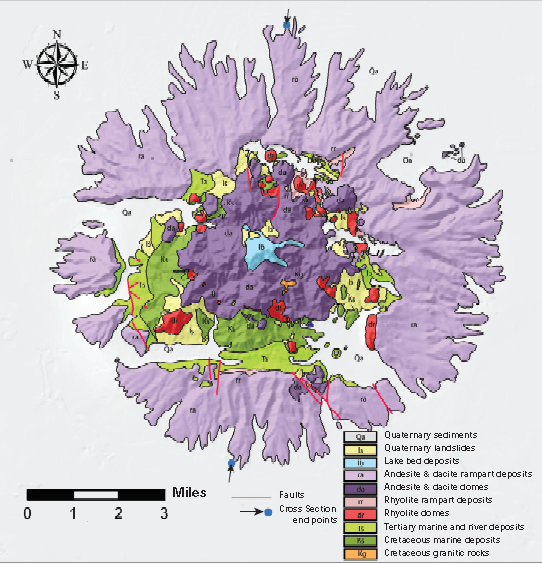
Marysville Buttes (Sutter Buttes) Gas Field geological map

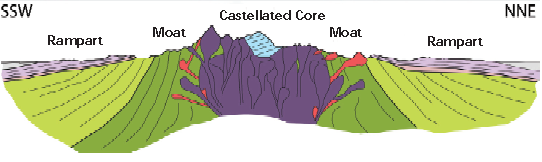
Marysville Buttes (Sutter Buttes) Gas Field Geologic Cross Section with 3x vertical exaggeration

The Sutter Buttes (Maidu: Histum Yani or Esto Yamani, Wintun: Olonai-Tol, Nisenan: Estom Yanim) are a small circular complex of eroded volcanic lava domes which rise as buttes above the flat plains of the Sacramento Valley in Sutter County, northern California. They are situated just outside Yuba City in the northern part of the state's Central Valley.

These remnants of a dormant volcano are colloquially referred to as the world's smallest mountain range. The Sutter Buttes have as their highest point the summit of South Butte, at 2,122 ft (647 m), which is also the highest point in Sutter County.

Land was designated as a state park in 2003 after the California State Park system acquired property on the North of the buttes. It has yet to be named officially and is not open to the public as the appropriate classification of park resources is still being decided by property management.

At the base of the mountain is the small town of Sutter. The town, county, and buttes are named for John Sutter, a man who received a large land grant in the area from the Mexican government.

== Geography ==
The volcanic remnants form a rough circle approximately 10 mi (16 km) from north to south and east to west.

=== Geology ===
The Sutter Buttes lie within the Central Valley of California.

They were formed about 1.6 million years ago in the early Pleistocene Epoch by volcanic activity. They are the remnants of a volcano that has been dormant for about 1.4 million years. Some geological references suggest that the volcano represents the southernmost boundary of the Cascade Volcanoes, but there are significant differences in age and form compared to the other volcanoes in that range. Others suggest that its age places it with the volcanic elements of the California Coast Ranges; its composition is closer to that range but does have significant differences.

The magma that gave rise to the Sutter Buttes first appeared as rhyolite, a molten rock rich in silicates. This silica-rich lava was viscous and thick, and emerged from the crust thick plugs of magma that pushed their way to the surface slowly, approximately 1.6 million years ago. Following this, a second set of eruptions occurred, whose magma was composed of andesite and dacite, compositions that were rich in magnesium and iron, which were much less viscous. This less viscous magma both breached the surface, as well as lifted the surrounding layers of earth, causing the volcanic domes that are representative of the Sutter Buttes today to sit prominently above the floor around them. As the softer sediments of these domes were eroded away their sediments were dispersed around the domes, leading to the sloping fan of earth around the Sutter Buttes, in formations known as ramparts.

Beneath the Sutter Buttes there exists a crisscrossing network of subterranean faults and ridgelines that have served as a network of channels, providing a relatively easy path to the surface for the magma that has formed the Sutter Buttes, as well as the rest of the Coast Range.

Exploration of natural gas leaks was first undertaken at South Butte by Dexter Cook in 1864, when he dug a 65 ft (20 m) shaft. Sutter Buttes Oil Company drilled a well in 1927 to a depth of 2,900 ft (880 m), and other wells were drilled on the western margin. Buttes Oilfields, Inc., drilled a well in 1932, but it wasn't until June 1935, though, that it drilled the first of four gas wells in the area of T. 15 N., R 1 E.

=== Soils and vegetation ===
The rugged central part of the Buttes has a stony, brown sandy loam of variable depth and good-to-somewhat-excessive drainage. The smoother perimeter has more variable soil, with clay or silt loam areas among the sandy loams. These soils support grassland or oak woodland. The Sutter Buttes contain many species of flora and fauna. Wildflowers are represented by numerous taxa; included in these many wildflowers is the yellow mariposa lily, Calochortus luteus.

== History ==
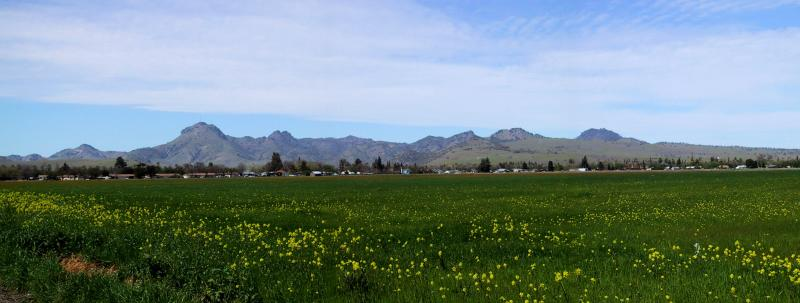
Sutter Buttes Terrain

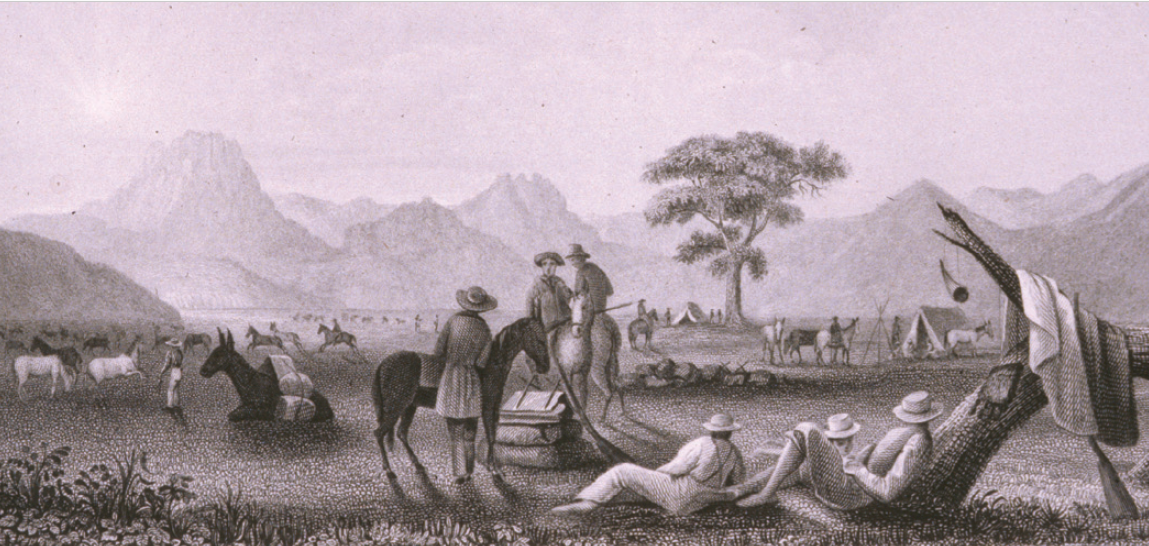
Sutter Buttes Terrain in 1841

=== Indigenous era ===
The Sutter Buttes figure prominently in the creation stories and other traditions of the indigenous Nisenan, Maidu, and Wintun peoples. The Nisenan lived on the East side of the Buttes, while the Patwin Wintun lived on the West side. The Nisenan name for the Buttes is Estom Yanim. The Maidu name for the Sutter Buttes is Histum Yani (middle mountains of the Valley) or Esto Yamani, while the Wintun name for the Sutter Buttes is Onolai-Tol. All of these names roughly mean "The Middle Mountains".

There were seasonal encampments in the Buttes, and all these tribes visited the Buttes regularly to gather acorns and other foods or to hunt game. The Buttes were also a center of regional Native American religion. According to anthropologist Alfred Kroeber, the Patwin village where the city of Colusa now stands was the "hotbed" where the Kuksu Cult was established. This religion spread through much of Northern California. Ceremonies were performed in earthen dance lodges where spirit impersonators would re-enact ancient mythological events.

In the Maidu and Nisenan religions, the Sutter Buttes is the place where dying people came to ascend to the afterlife.

=== Spanish and Mexican periods ===
The Spaniard Gabriel Moraga was the first European to see the Sutter Buttes in 1806. In 1817, the Californio Luis Antonio Argüello named it "los tres picos" (the three peaks, name that appears on the Mexican land grant made to Captain John Sutter). In 1843, John C. Frémont called them "The Three Buttes." James Dwight Dana explored the buttes on 16 Oct. 1841, while part of the United States Exploring Expedition. In June 1846, John C. Frémont, on a massacre spree since April, stopped at the Sutter Buttes. Fearing an attack from the local Indians, Frémont led a preemptive attack which killed many Indians and led the others to flee the area. It remains known as the Sutter Buttes massacre.

=== American period ===
Under the 1848 Treaty of Guadalupe Hildago at the end of the war with Mexico the United States acquired California. Under the treaty the United States agreed to respect titles conveyed by Mexico. John Sutter claimed ownership of the Sutter Buttes under his New Helvetia grant. The United States Land Commission and the courts determined that Sutter's New Helvetia Grant did not include the Buttes. No land title in the Buttes arises under a Spanish or Mexican Grant, all title to land in the Buttes derives from the federal government. During the Gold Rush, the Buttes were called the "Marysville Buttes". In 1920, the state of California failed to purchase the Marysville Buttes, which finally became the "Sutter Buttes" in 1949.

Howel Williams further investigated the geology of the buttes in 1929. Williams teamed up with Garniss Curtis in 1977 to include radiometric dating of the area.

Since 1929, the State of California considered purchasing the land for protection and a state park. In 2003, the California Department of Parks and Recreation purchased 1,784.5 acres (7.222 km^{2}) in Peace Valley, on the north side of the Sutter Buttes, for $3 million with the intent to develop it as a state park. In 2005 the Parks Commission determined that the property would be a state park, but it was not officially named.

== Titan missile silos and U-2 crash ==
Between 1960 and 1962, the US Air Force built a Titan 1 ICBM missile launch complex at the north side of the Sutter Buttes, the Pennington Missile Base. A part of the 851st Strategic Missile Squadron headquartered at nearby Beale Air Force Base, the site was designated "851-B." The companion 851-A and 851-C launch sites were located near Lincoln, California, and Chico, California. Designed by the United States Army Corps of Engineers to survive a nuclear attack, the Titan 1 complexes were the largest and most hardened of the first-generation ICBM facilities. The sites were composed of three underground missile silos interconnected to support and command bunkers by a network of tunnels. The facility was active between 1962 and 1965. In January 1965, the Titan 1 ICBM was phased out by the US Department of Defense. All missiles were removed from the site by February 1965. The facilities were then decommissioned and the land subsequently sold back into private ownership. The site has been host to many vandals and trespassers since the early 1980s to the present.

In September 2016, a US Air Force Lockheed U-2 from the 1st Reconnaissance Squadron crashed in the Sutter Buttes during a training mission, killing one of the two pilots.

== Public access ==
Before 1960, the land was private, but accessible to the public. In 1960, a fire spread on the Buttes and the ranchers decided to close its access to the public. Since the state acquired some of the Buttes, it intends to redevelop its public access but the neighboring ranchers are highly hostile to that idea.

Public access to the Sutter Buttes is limited. Almost all of the surrounding land is privately held by ranchers and farmers, but an exception is a 200-acre (0.81 km^{2}) parcel encompassing most of North Butte, donated by deed from the McClatchy Company to the Sutter Buttes Regional Land Trust. A few naturalists and local organizations, including Middle Mountain Interpretive Hikes, and the Sutter County Historical Society, lead hikes through some areas.

In 2003, the California Department of Parks and Recreation purchased 1,785 acres (722 ha) of land within the Sutter Buttes for $2.9 million. This land was planned to be developed into a state park, however, this has not been completed due to the inability to purchase land that would connect the park to a county road. Owners of the land within the Sutter Buttes continue to oppose the development of the area due to economical and emotional ties to the area. On the loop around the mountain, every access road has posted warning signs stating private property and refusing trespassers.

== Gallery ==
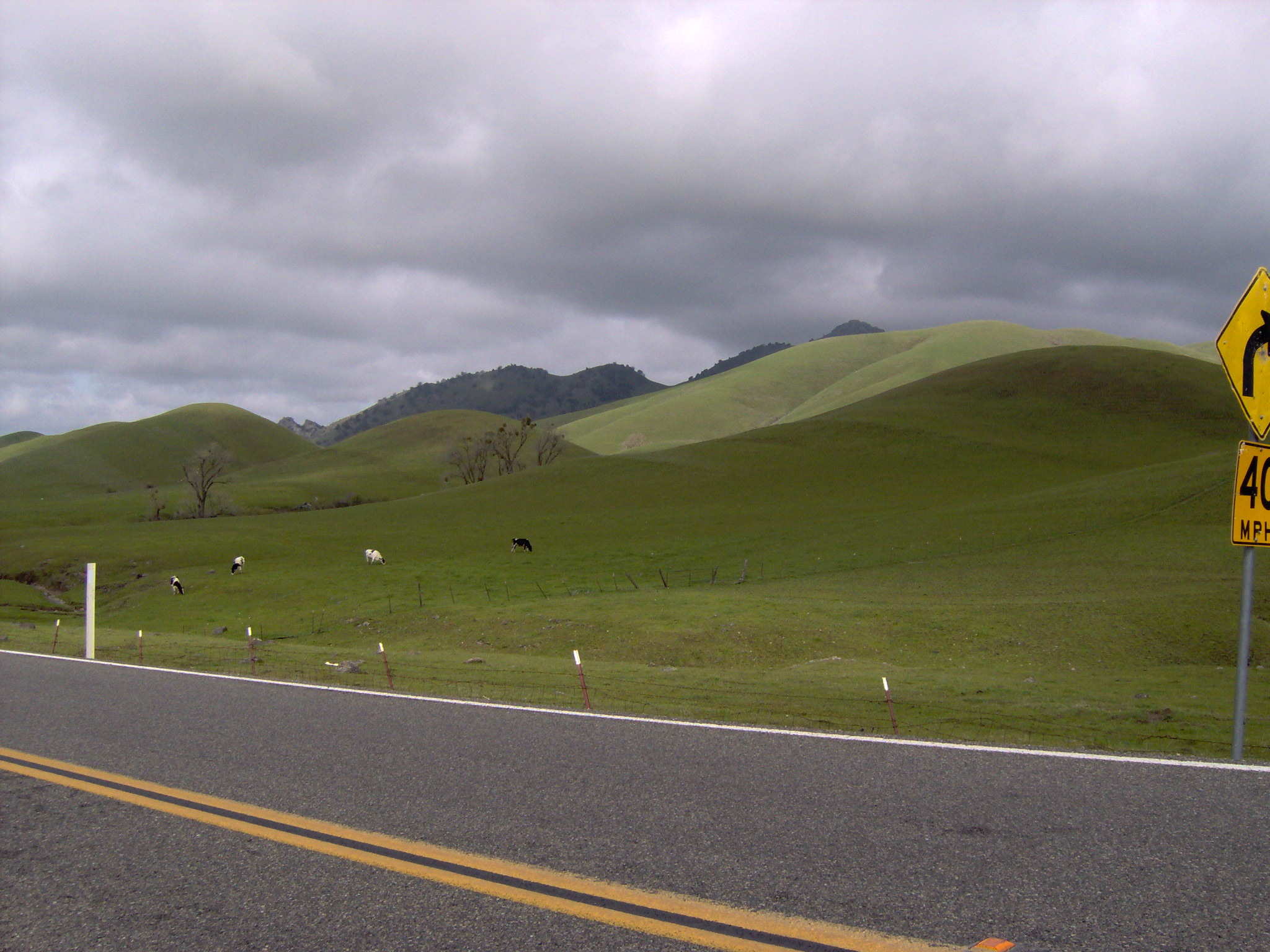
Sutter Buttes, 2006

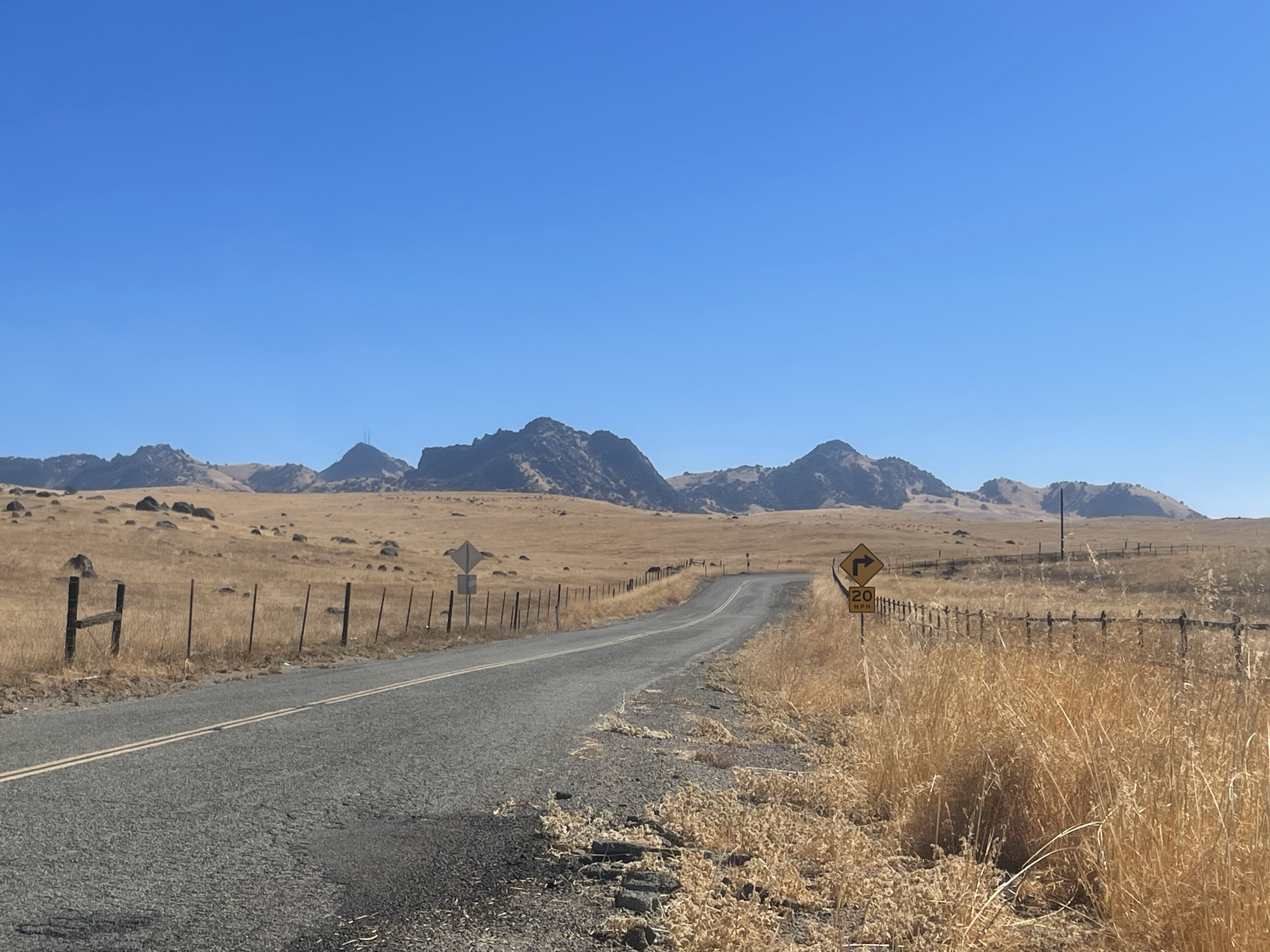
Sutter Buttes, 2024

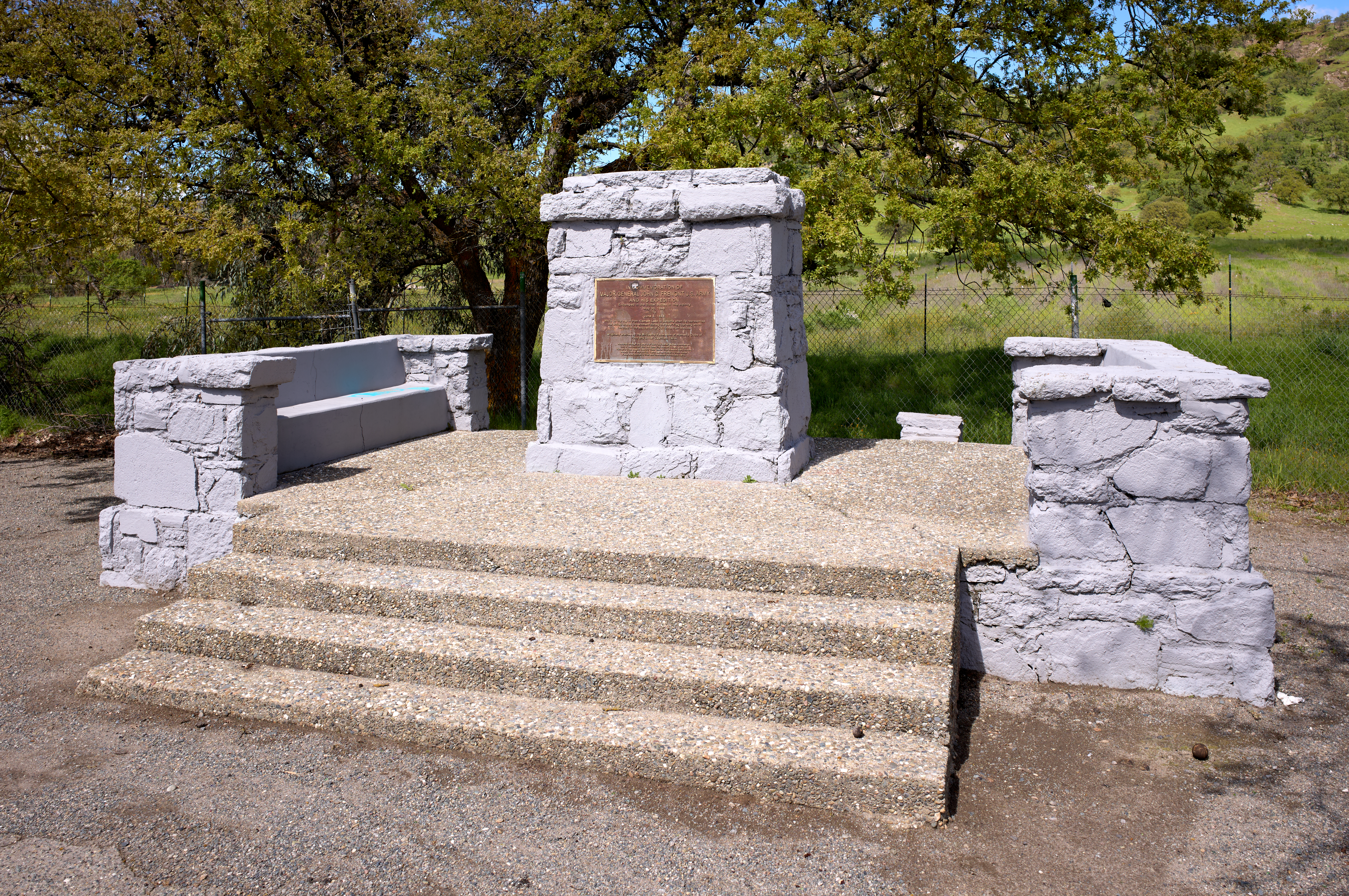
A monument at the base of the mountains indicating that John C. Fremont camped nearby

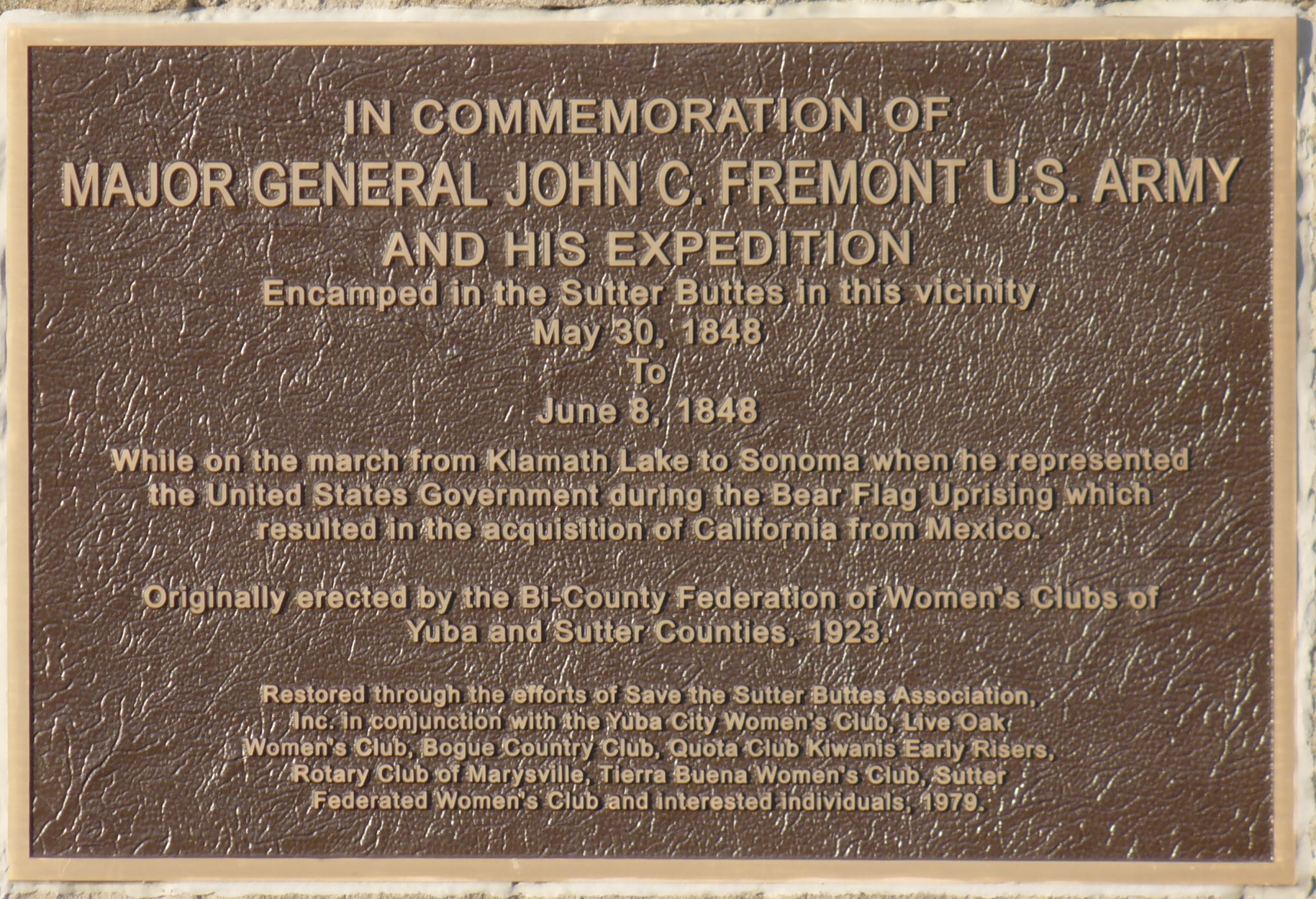
A close up of the inscription on the memorial

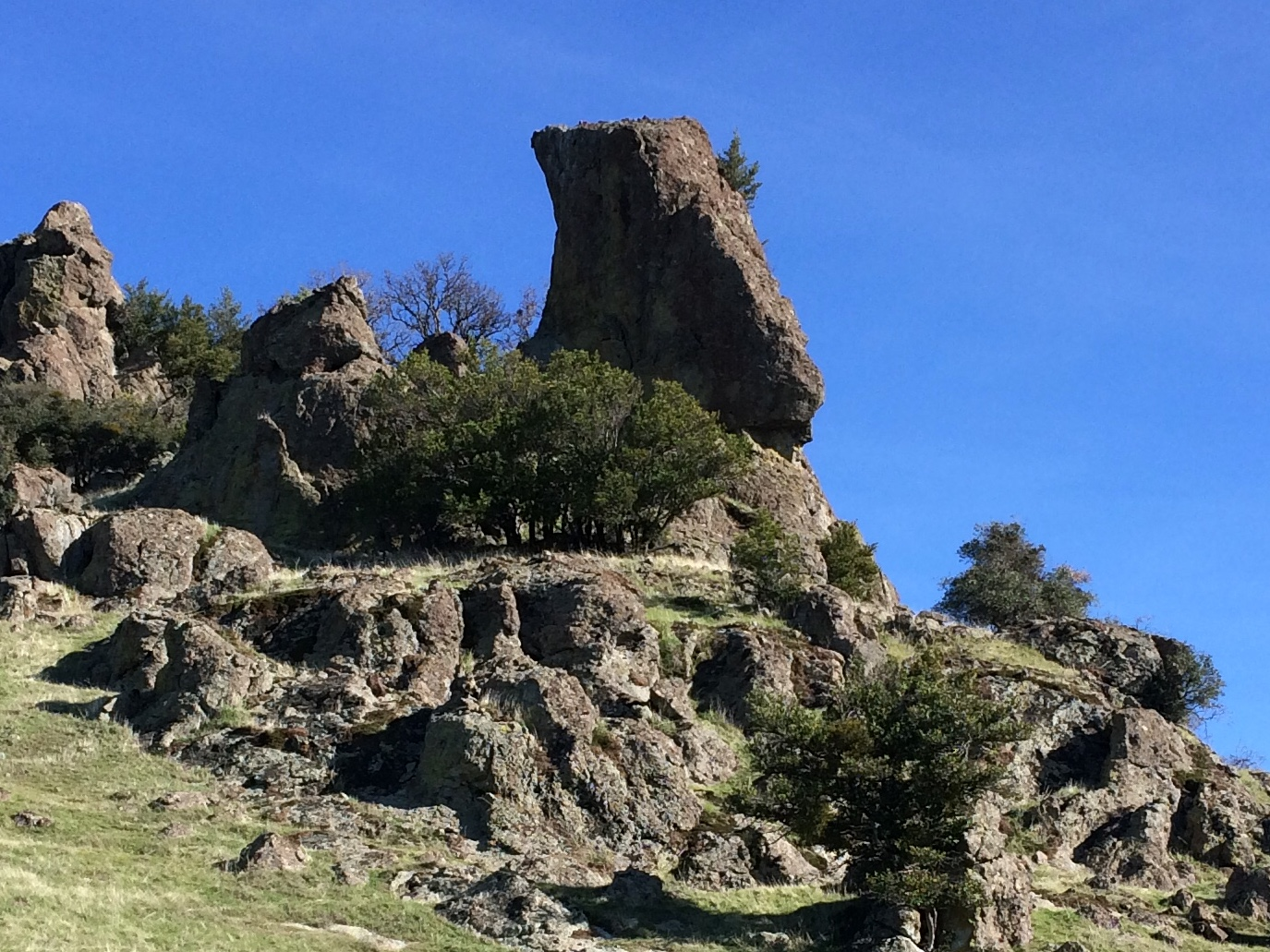
The Tiki

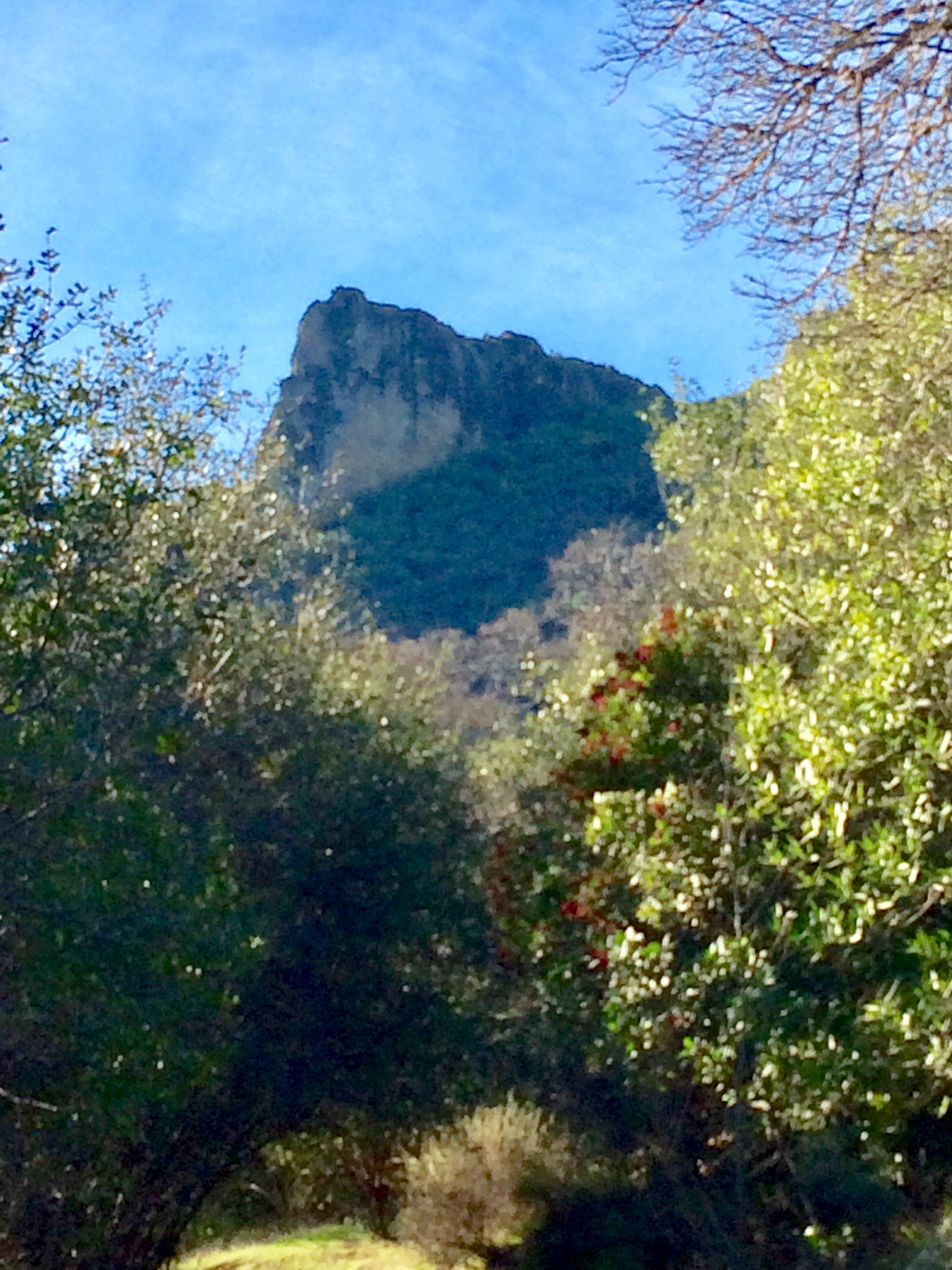
Rock of Gibraltar, Sutter Buttes, California

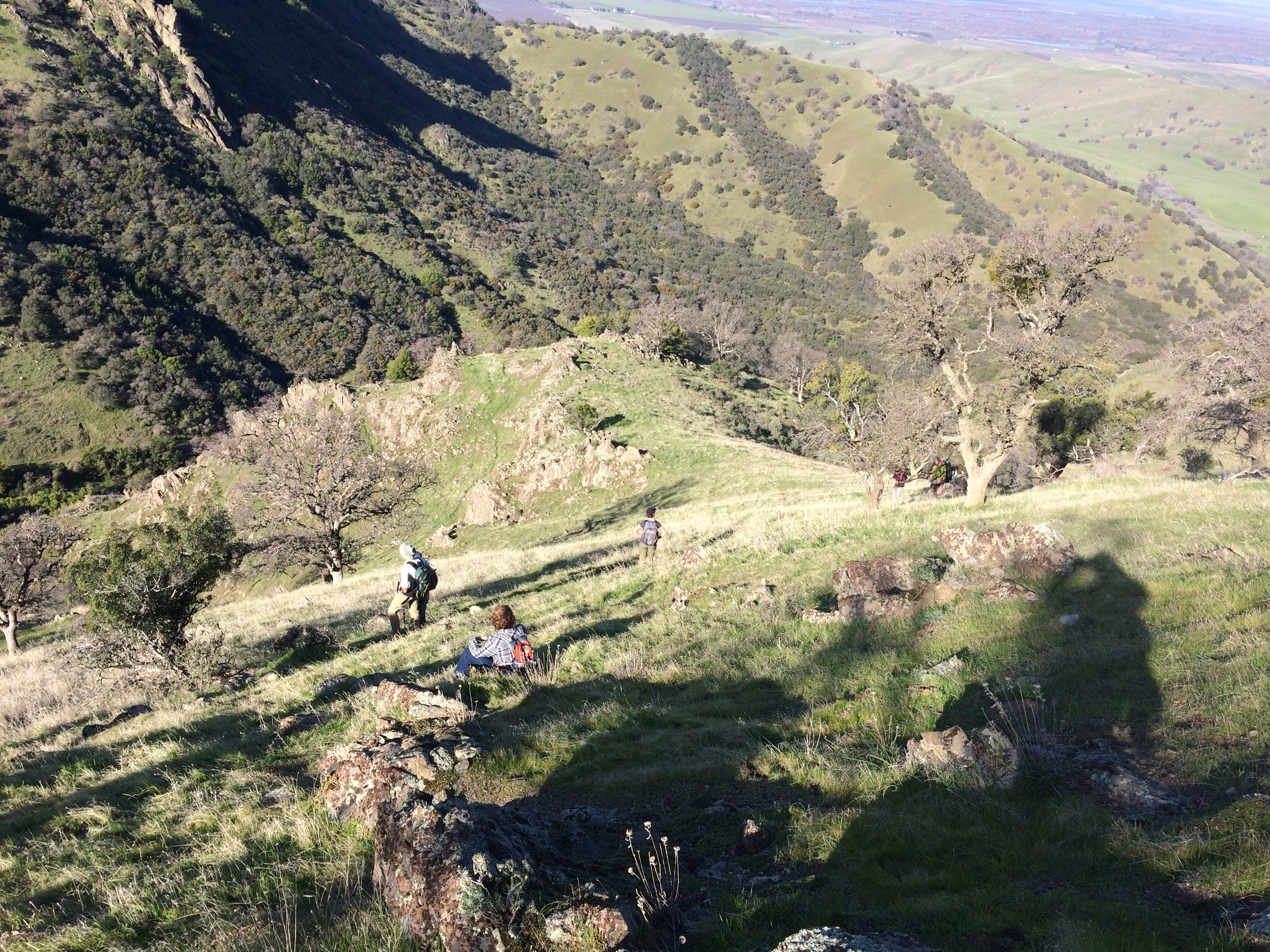
Hikers on a slope

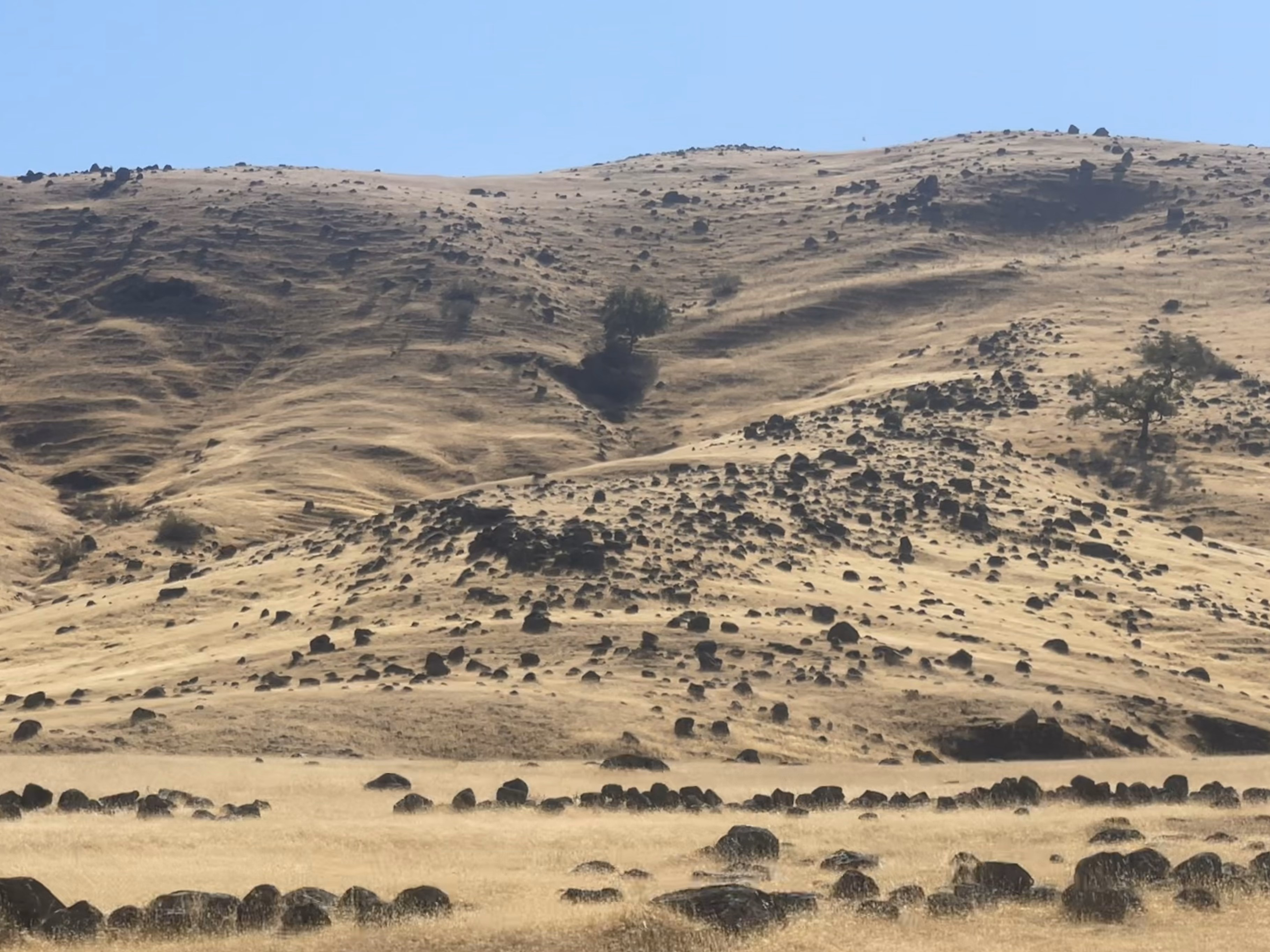
Remnants of volcanic explosion deposits

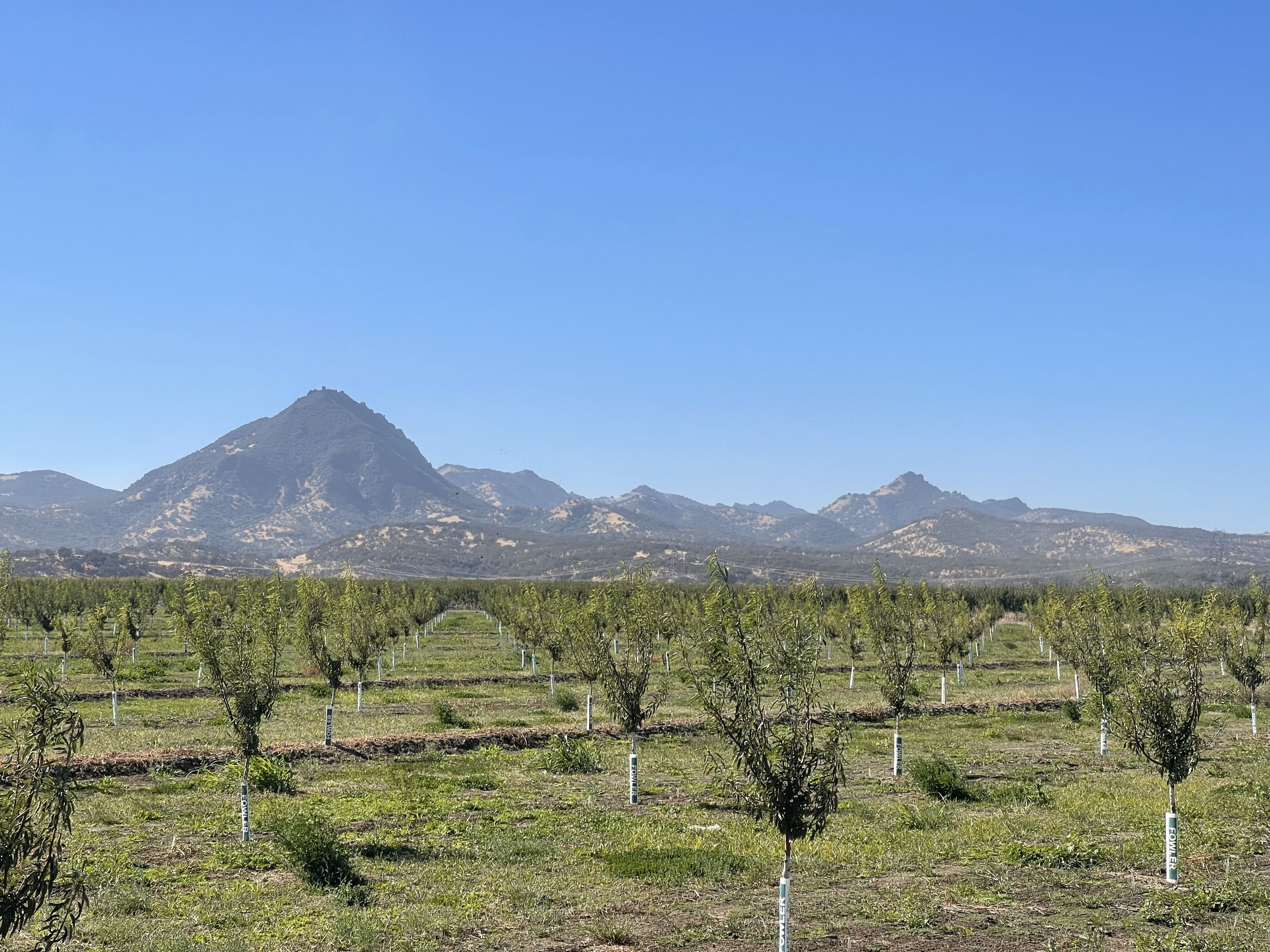
Sutter Buttes and private orchard

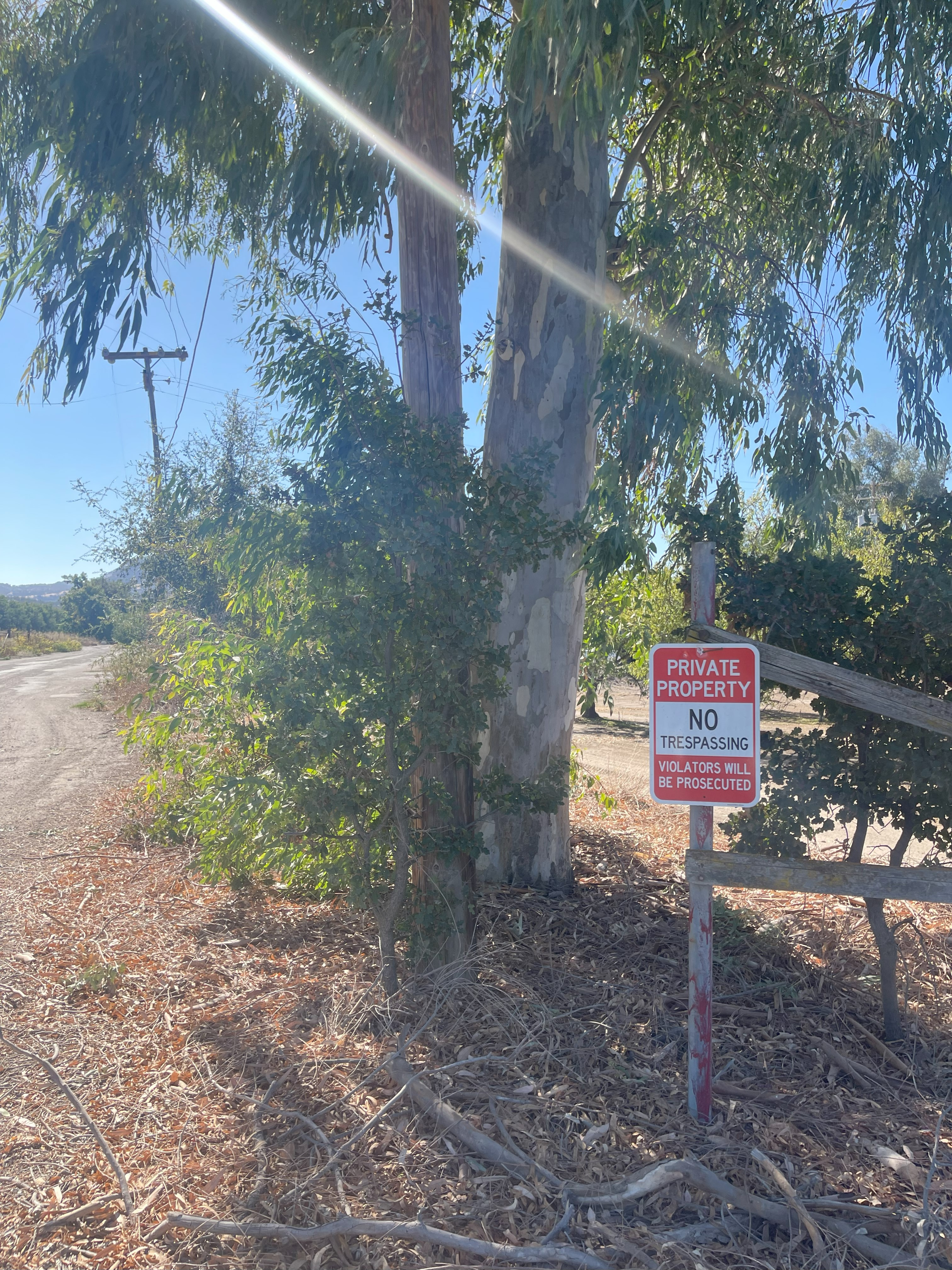
Private Property, No Trespassers sign on adjoined farm

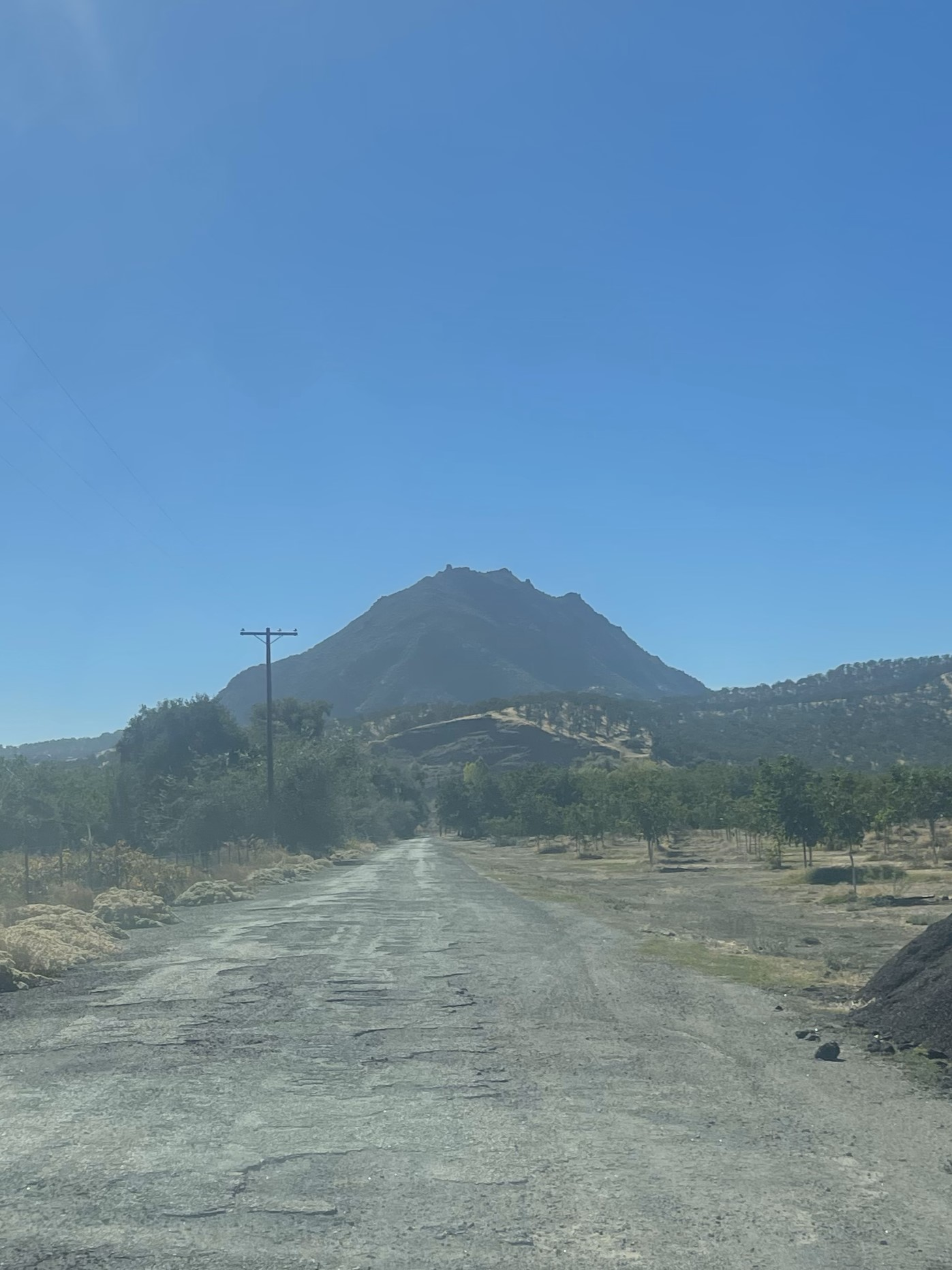
Private Access Road

== See also ==
- List of highest points in California by county
- Island range
- Sky island

== Sources ==
- Allan, Stuart (2005). California Road and Recreation Atlas. Benchmark Maps. p. 64. ISBN 0-929591-80-1.
- "Sutter Buttes Regional Land Trust".
- Hogan, C. Michael (2009). Stromberg, N. (ed.). "Yellow Mariposa Lily (Calochortus luteus)". GlobalTwitcher.com. Archived from the original on October 4, 2011.
- Wood, Charles A.; Kienle, Jürgen, eds. (1990). Volcanoes of North America. Cambridge University Press. pp. 225–226. ISBN 0-521-43811-X.
- Project Naming and Classification Document (PDF) (Report). Sutter Buttes (2nd ed.). California State Parks. March 8, 2005.
- Interim Operational Guidelines. Northern Buttes District, Valley Sector (Report). Sutter Buttes. California State Parks. March 1, 2005. "Approved by PPPC"
- Bischoff, Matt C., Historian II (February 2007). Cultural Landscape Report. Northern Service Center (Report). Sutter Buttes State Park, Sutter County, California. Sacramento, California: California Department of Parks and Recreation.
- Cultural Resources Inventory of the Sutter Buttes. Northern Buttes District (Report). Sutter Buttes State Park, Sutter County, California (revised ed.). Oroville, CA: California Department of Parks and Recreation. 2011 [2007].
