= Maidu language =

Extinct Maiduan language of northeastern California, US

Northeastern Maidu
- Májdy
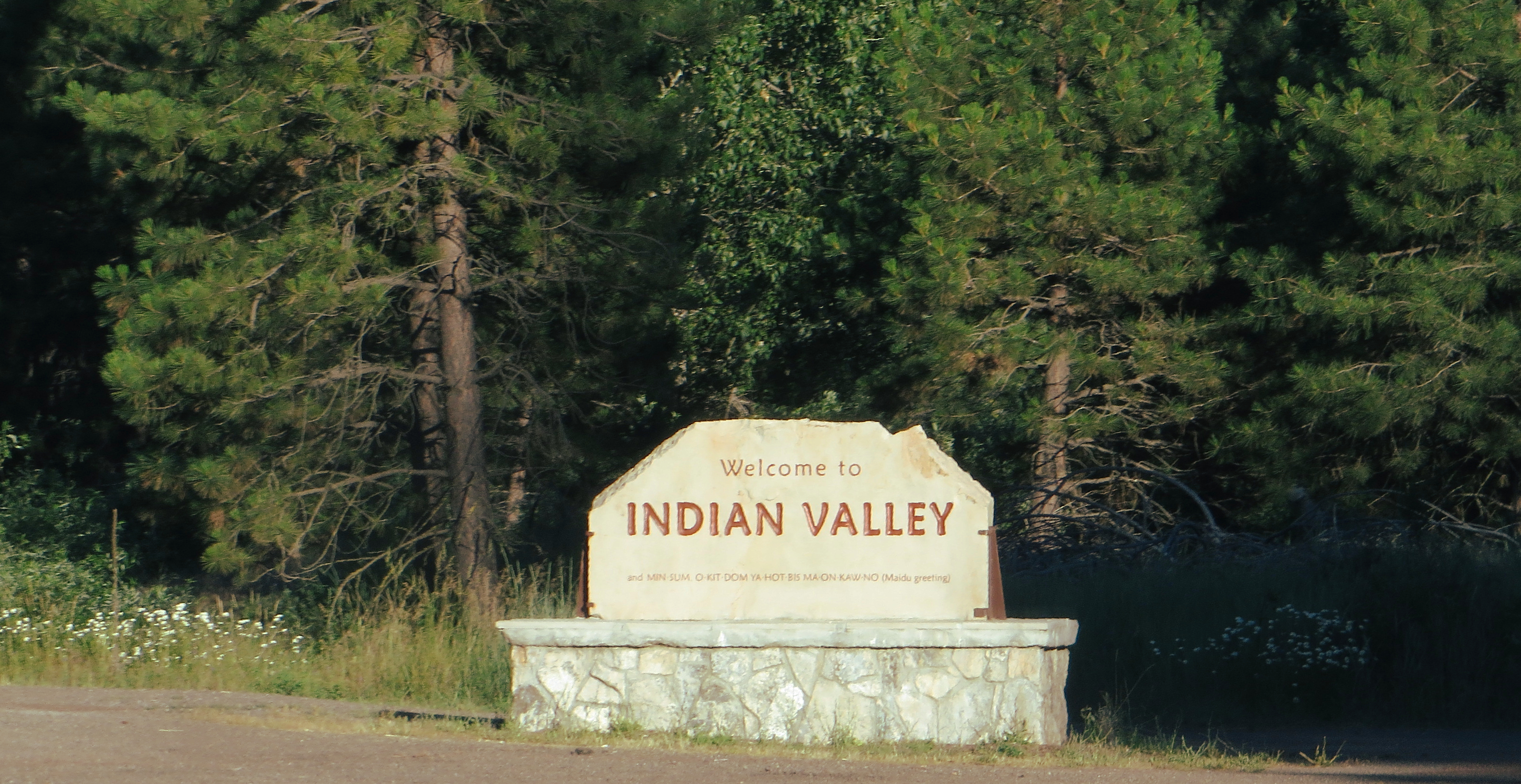
- Maidu greeting on sign in Indian Valley, California
- Native to: United States
- Region: California
- Extinct: 2007 few semispeakers (2011)
- Revival: 2004
- Language family: Penutian?: Maiduan; Northeastern Maidu

Language codes
- ISO 639-3: nmu
- Glottolog: nort2952
- ELP: Maidu
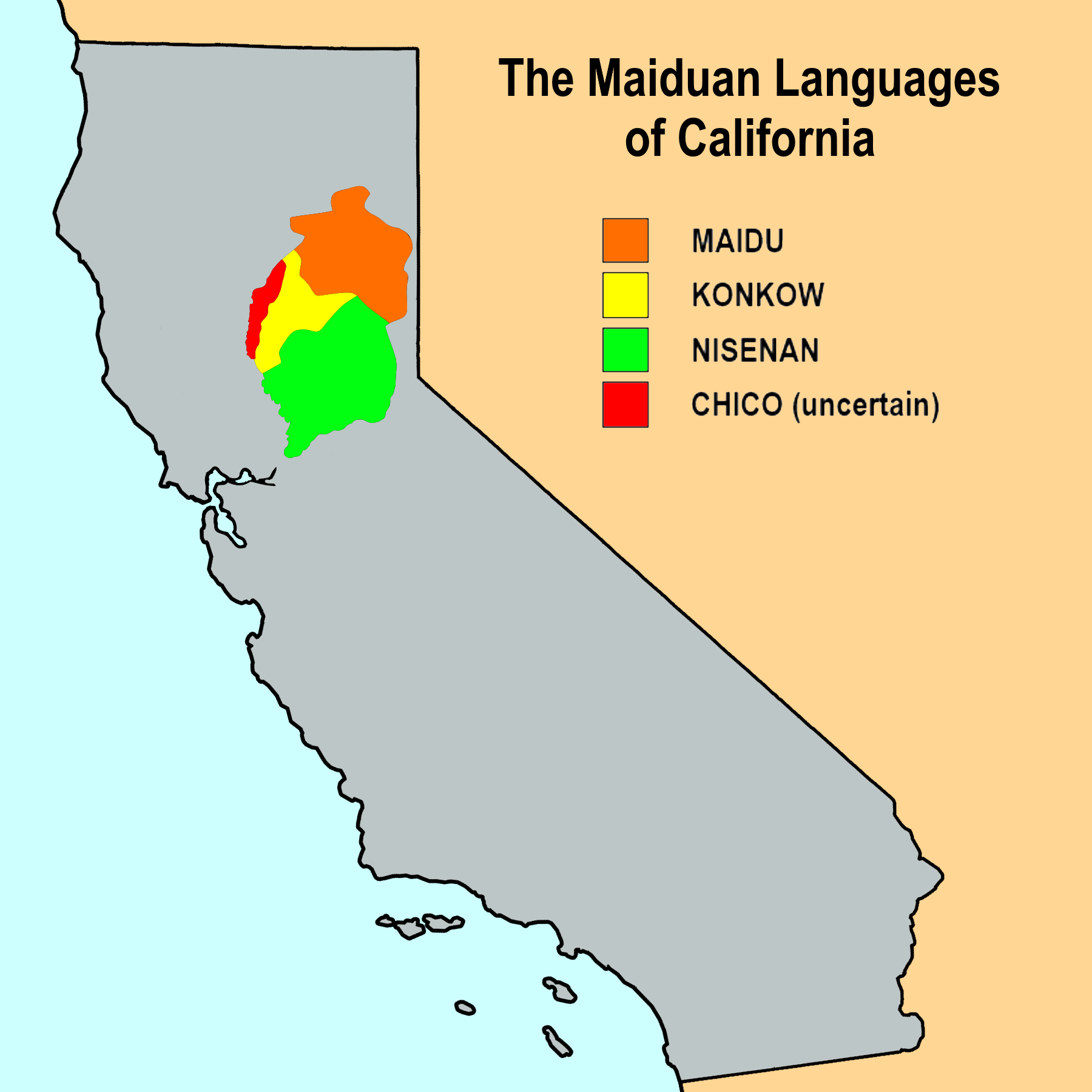
- Pre-contact distribution of Maiduan languages, including Maidu (in orange)

- Maidu is classified as Critically Endangered by the UNESCO Atlas of the World's Languages in Danger.

Maidu /ˈmaɪduː/, also Northeastern Maidu or Mountain Maidu, is an extinct Maiduan language of California, United States. It was spoken by the Maidu peoples who traditionally inhabit the mountains east and south of Lassen Peak in the American River and Feather River basins. These river regions include such valleys in the northern Sierra Nevada mountains of California as Indian Valley, American Valley, Butte Valley, and Big Meadows. Maidu may also refer to the related Konkow and Nisenan languages.

== History ==
The pre-contact Maidu peoples lived in a hunting and gathering society in parts of central California. These peoples lived in an area around what are now called Mount Lassen, Honey Lake, Sacramento, and Lake Tahoe. They spoke closely related languages, including the living Maidu, Konkow and Nisenan languages, along with the Chico language and other extinct variations.

== Revitalization efforts ==
Active language revitalization efforts have been underway since 2004. As of 2011, classes in Maidu were available in Nevada County, California. Farrell Cunningham, one of the youngest fluent Yamani Maidu speakers, taught "Mountain Maidu language classes in Greenville, Susanville, Nevada City and Auburn", and was active with the Maidu Theater in Nevada City, until his death on August 11, 2013, at age 37.

== Classification ==
The Maiduan language family is considered by some linguists to belong to the Penutian language group, along with such families as Miwok, Wintun, Yokuts, and Ohlone. However, this language family is disputed, with others claiming that it is invalid.

== Phonology ==
=== Consonants ===
Maidu has eighteen consonantal phonemes. The consonants listed below are from the transcription system used by Shipley. Shipley's orthography is listed in brackets when it differs from the IPA transcription.

		Bilabial	Alveolar	Palatal	Velar	Glottal
Nasal		m	n			
Plosive	tenuis	p	t	c	k	ʔ
Plosive	ejective	pʼ	tʼ	cʼ	kʼ	
Implosive		ɓ ⟨b⟩	ɗ ⟨d⟩			
Fricative			s			h
Approximant		w	l	j		

- /m/ is realized as [ŋ] before /k, kʼ/.
- In the 1950s and 1960s, younger speakers began to realize /c, cʼ/ as postalveolar affricates [tʃ, tʃʼ], perhaps under influence from English.

=== Vowels ===
There are six phonemic vowels in Maidu. Once again, the chart comes from the orthographic system employed by Shipley.

	Front	Central	Back
Close	i	ɨ ⟨y⟩	u
Mid	e		o
Open		a	

These six vowels are characterized by several different allophones depending on the phonetic environments in which they occur (initial/noninitial, stressed/unstressed, and open/closed syllables). The base phone of the vowels occurs in initial open syllables with stress. The lowest and most central allophones occur in unstressed closed syllables. According to Shipley, (a) and (y) have allophones that almost converge once they have centralized, (i) and (u) have allophones that barely centralize and drop slightly lower, approaching [ɪ] and [ʊ]. Meanwhile, (e) and (o) have more change than (i) and (u) but less than (a) and (y).

Vowel length is nonphonemic, and changes according to the vowel's place within the word. The vowels can exhibit vowel lengths of less than a mora, one mora, or 1.5–2 morae. The vowel is less than one mora in unstressed syllables, around one mora in closed stressed syllables, and more than one mora in open stressed syllables.

=== Syllables ===
The syllables in Maidu follow a basic CV or CVC structure. The majority of words consist of alternating consonants and vowels, while combinations such as CVCVCCV also occur. In all cases, the syllables are consonant initial, and diphthongs do not occur in the coda. The syllables in Maidu display pitch in conjunction with the stress in the word. Syllables with the primary stress in the word have a higher pitch and tend to be more tense and have longer vowels. Secondary stress occurs with a low to middle pitch and lengthening of the vowel. Weak stress has a low to middle pitch and short vowels.

== Morphology ==
Notation: In the morphology section, some notations are used to refer to changes occurring to the morphemes when they are conjugated or combined with one another. 'I' indicates a change whereby the preceding word goes through the following changes: after a vowel (V) of a vowel and glottal stop (V') the root remains the same, so /wepa/ remains /wepa/. After a k or k', the preceding vowel is duplicated, so /banak'/ becomes /banak'a/. In all other cases i is added, so /jaman/ becomes /jamani/. 'R' indicates reduplication of the previous segment, so /my/ becomes /mymy/.

=== Nouns ===
Maidu nouns are divided into two classes. The first class consists of kinship terms, but these do not include the terms for child and son. The nouns of this class are more limited in use than other nouns, as they are always subject to possession by another noun. These terms, such as /ne/ 'mother' occur in conjunction with a pronoun or a demonstrative, as in:

- nikne - my mother
- minne - your mother
- myne - (that) mother

The second class of nouns consists of free morphemes, and can be broken down into smaller subclasses based on the origin of the noun stem. The first subclass contains nouns whose root and stem are identical, such as /wepa/ "coyote". The stem /kyle/ 'woman' is notable in that is usually occurs as /kyle/, but may alternate to /kylok/ when attached with suffixes to form 'old woman' and 'women'.

The second subclass contains nouns that are formed from several different roots. This compound may be formed from two noun roots (/mom/ 'water' and /pano/ 'grizzly' become mompano 'otter'), a noun root and an auxiliary verb (/jask'ak/ 'skinny' and /no/ 'along' become jask'akno 'skinny man'), a noun root and a distributive suffix (/jaman/ 'mountain' and /R-to/ 'all around' become jamanmanto 'mountains all around'), noun roots and an unidentifiable morpheme (/k'am/ 'belly' and /pum/ 'membrane' with a meaningless morpheme /pu/ become k'ampumpu 'tripe'), and a noun root with a diminutive morpheme (and /sol/ 'song' and /I-be/ become solibe 'ditty'.).

==== Pronouns ====
The pronouns are /nik'/ first person, /min/ second person, /maj/ third person, and /my/ demonstrative. /maj/ does not occur in the singular, and so constructions using /my/ serve as the third person singular. These include in a noun construction ('that woman' for 'her'), singularly ('that one') and repeated ('that person'). Other than /maj/, there are no special plural forms of the pronouns, as they are inflected for number along with other nouns.

==== Number inflection in nouns ====
While English distinguishes between singular and plural, Maidu distinguishes singular, dual, and plural. These inflections are most often used in conjunction with the pronouns, and are much less commonly used with other nouns. Both dual /c'o/ and plural /cy/ suffixes have several allomorphs. Along with these, there is a second plural morpheme /t'yt'y/ which indicates both plurality and a diminutive sense.

=== Verbs ===
Maidu verbs consist of the verbal theme along a series of suffixes. Similar to nouns, the verb stems in Maidu result from several different sources. Some verbs, like /sol/ 'sing' are composed of a single simple root. Other verbs include a noun in the verb stem, such as /k'awba/ 'to dig a hole', which is a compound of /k'aw/ 'dirt' and /ba/ 'to dig'. Still other compound verb stems result from the conjunction of two separate verb roots, as in /t'ikc'e/ 'to believe', from /t'ik/ 'to have enough' and /c'e/ 'to see'. Like nouns, some verb stems include a component that has no meaning on its own, such as /bokweje/ 'to invoke', where /weje/ means 'to talk' and /bok/ has no known meaning. Still others are the result of a verb and an auxiliary verb, and finally a set of verbs involving motion uses /'y/ as its first compound.

==== Verb theme ====
The verb theme is a combination of the verb stem along with one or more thematic suffixes. All thematic suffixes are optional, and thus may be excluded from the verb, with the base stem acting as the theme on its own.

- Causative
- Designation of verbal object
- Motion-Location
- Negative
- Aspectual
- Evidential

===== Causative =====
The causative suffix /ti/ indicates that the actor is causing an action to occur, as in ma dondom 'as te 'ynotik'as, which means 'I walked the child, holding his hand' or 'I caused the child to walk, holding (his) hand.' This morpheme also occurs in words like /wonoti/ 'to kill', literally 'to cause to die'.

===== Verbal object =====
The designation of the verbal object takes five different forms. /'us/ is a reflexive suffix, as in wonoti'us'am 'he killed himself.' The second suffix, /jo/ indicated both plural object and repetitive actions. This occurs in c'ani majse 'ono wojomak'as 'I'm going to hit them (one after another) on the head with a stick', and humbotmenwet 'as hesbopajodom 'I kept on shoving anything into the sack.' The third suffix is used commonly and appears to have an obscure meaning. /to/ can be used with /ju/ 'rub on' to form juto 'rub in' and with /mej/ 'give' to form mejto 'buy'. It may work to create the transitive form of a verb, although this is not always the case. /toto/, a reduplication of /to/ indicates reciprocal action.

===== Motion-location =====
The motion-location auxiliaries occur as 16 different suffixes.

1. -/c'ik/ over or into with the implication of closing or covering /puc'ik/ 'to swell shut'
2. -/c'o/ up and over the edge, around from behind
3. -/daw/ down and away without and indication of a goal in the movement
4. -/dik/ up to and into a goal or objective
5. -/doj/ upward /weledoj/ 'to run up'
6. -/je/ hither
7. -/kit/ downward
8. -/k'oj/ away from here
9. -/lek/ hurriedly
10. -/mit/ onto or into with an implication of downward motion
11. -/n/ downstream, downhill (usually implies southwest)
12. -/no/ along, no implication of direction or attitude /weleno/ 'to run along'
13. -/paj/ against, usually figurative /jodotpaj/ ' tie up/, /haspaj/ 'to urinate against (as a dog would)'
14. -/pin/ hither, no implication of goal
15. -/sip/ out of /t'upsip/ 'spit out'
16. -/t'a/ on top
17. -/waj/ apart

Some of these suffixes can occur together in limited constructions: /c'opin/ 'up over the edge and hither', /c'ono/ 'over the edge of something; in a circle', /noje/ 'aimlessly', and /sippin/ 'out of and hither'.

/doj/, /kit/, /k'oj/, and /mit/ all lose their final consonant before the suffix /nu/, which indicates duration. /by/-/doj/-/nu/ becomes bydonu 'to stick up'.

===== Negative =====
The negative suffix /men/ has two variants, /men/ after a consonant and /n/ after a vowel. kyloknonom 'as wetemmen'usan 'the women didn't use to dance' and monma'amkano 'you won't'

===== Aspectual =====
The aspectual class contains six suffixes.

1. -/bos/ completion wejebosk'as 'I'm through talking'
2. -/c'yj/ unable hybonam jysipc'yjk'as 'I can't get out of the house'
3. -/doj/ inchoative nik'i lenom 'as jotitdojdom kak'an 'My garden is beginning to bloom and become green'
4. -/nu/ durative
5. -/ti/ for the sake of
6. -/bew/ a little more mym p'ybem 'as lalambewk'an 'That boy got a little taller'

===== Evidential =====
The evidential class consists of three individual morphemes.

1. -/c'oj/ quotative mym majdyk mykotom 'ac'oj'am 'It was that man's grandmother, it is said'
2. -/wew/ evidential mym p'ybec'om 'as 'ydojwewk'an 'Those two boys are apparently coming up'
3. -/ky/ seems hes hututini wejepem kakyk'an 'How crazily he seems to talk'

==== Verb inflection ====
The verb is completed by the addition of five inflectional suffixes. These suffixes mark the verb for expression of tense, aspect, mode, person, and number. There is variability in the ordering of these suffixes. There are five possible inflections for mode: indicative, subjunctive, optative, interrogative, and gerundial. Separate indicative modes occur for present-past, future, habitual past, and past punctual. The optative mode can be split into monitive, intentive, and hortatory.

===== Present-past indicative =====
The present-past indicative is marked by a null morpheme. /sol/ 'to sing' becomes solk'as 'I sang', sol'amk'as 'we two sang', sol'emk'es 'we all sang', sol'amkano 'you sang', or solk'an 'he, she, they sang'. Plurality is marked only in first person, otherwise 2nd and 3rd person have no marking to differentiate duality or plurality. This tense of the verb is used to express a recently completed action, a punctual action that is taking place, a state of being, an equation (something is something else), or a present static location.

===== Future indicative =====
Future indicative is marked by /ma/. solmak'as 'I will sing', solma'amk'as 'we two will sing', solma'emk'es 'we all will sing', solma'amkano 'you will sing', and solmak'an 'he, she, they will sing'. Future indicative indicate a future punctual action, a directive or a mild imperative.

===== Other pasts =====
The habitual past, marked with /'/ for past and /us/ for habit, indicates an action that was habitually done in the past, such as weje'usas 'I used to talk', or penem nikkotoc'om 'yhej'usan 'My two grandmothers used to go along'. The past punctual indicative, marked simple with /'/, is a rare verb tense. This form refers to a single act in the past that is disconnected from the current context.

===== Subjunctive =====
the subjunctive mode, marked with /k'e/, occurs only with /jak/ 'resemble' and /na/ 'result in', such as jakk'es 'I seem to be'.

===== Optative =====
The optative mode occurs in three different forms. All three forms are marked with the morpheme /b/. The monitive optative, marked with /y'y/, indicates a possible future event that is unpleasant or undesirable in nature, such as wonoby'ys 'I might die'.

Intentive optative occurs only in first person to indicate intention, and sometimes is also used with demonstrative or interrogative words to form questions relating to instructions. Use with the singular form is common, while dual and plural are relatively rare. 'yk'oj'is 'I'm going to go'

The hortatory optative is marked by /a/, and usually uses /t/ as an allomorph of the optative marker. This form indicates the idea 'let' as in 'yk'ojtas 'let me go'.

===== Interrogative =====
The interrogative mode is marked with /k'ade/, as in solk'ades 'am I singing?'.

===== Imperative =====
The imperative mode is marked by several different morphemes, depending on how the action is to be carried out. /pi/ is used when the action is to be carried out in the presence of the speaker, as in c'enopi 'Look!'. /pada/ is used when the action is to be completed in the absence of the speaker.

== Syntax ==
=== Noun case suffixes ===
Nouns must receive one of ten possible case markings. These cases are classified into four external distribution classes. These classes are subject, object, possessive, and locative. The cases are:

1. Subject: The nominative case is marked either by the addition of an /m/ such as /wepam/ from /wepa/ 'coyote' or the deletion of the final consonant as in /ni/ from /nik/ 'I'. Nominative is used for the performer of a verb, both A and B in a sentence where A=B, naming, and for the vocative.
2. Object: The object case also has two allomorphs. The first is the I form, as mentioned in the morphology section, so that /jaman/ becomes /jamani/ 'mountain'. Other nouns have no change, as in /nik/ 'I'. This case is used for the direct and indirect objects, and is also used by some speakers in naming.
3. Possessive: The possessive case is marked by /Ik'/ or /Ik'i/, as in /wepak'i/ 'coyote's', as /i/ as in /niki/ 'my', or as /k'i/ as in /mink'i/ 'thy'. Possessive is used to refer to both actual possessors (Coyote's flour) and figurative or characteristic possessors (the white man's flour), as well as in some cases to indicate 'for the sake of'.

These next seven cases all belong to the locative class:

1. Comitative: The comitative is marked by /Ik'an/ or /k'an/ and means 'along with'. ''wepak'an' 'along with Coyote'
2. Instrumental: The instrumental case is marked with /ni/ and is used to indicate the means by which something is done or with something as an ingredient. nik?opam jaluluni solti'usan 'my grandfather used to play on a flute' or mym mahatim kak'an wolek'i lawani japem 'that bread is made with white man's flour'.
3. Locative: The locative case is marked with /di/. This case indicates a static location in space, the space within which an action is carried out, a static location in time, or 'toward'. kuludi kak'as 'ynojbodukkym 'I seldom walk around in the dark'.
4. Allative: The allative case is marked with /nak/ or /na/. This case usually means 'toward' and rarely means 'for'. mym huskym c'ajna lykk'ojam 'the snake crawled to another place'
5. Ablative: The ablative case is marked by /nan/ and is the marker for movement away from something or the origin of an object. wolenan 'as 'uni mek'as 'I got this from the white man'
6. Indefinite locative: The indefinite locative is marked with /te/. This case is used very rarely, and usually indicates a location unknown to the speaker. homonte mink'i wat'a dakym 'where is your dishtowel?'
7. Linear distributive: The linear distributive is marked with /no/. Like the indefinite locative, this case is used very rarely. This form marks a location with the meaning of 'along' or 'alongside of' and always occurs in conjunction with a noun indicating something with a linear form. 'adom 'unim sewno momi kutidom t'uc'ikdom sewi 'odo tawalwonom 'Then, draining out all of the water along this river and damming up the river, they worked the gold.'

=== Word order ===
There are several different word classes that go into making a Maidu sentence, split into the major and the minor classes. The seven major distribution classes are Subject, Object, Possessive, Locative, Finite Verb, Dependent Verb, and Copula. The minor classes are Connectives, Hesitation forms, Emphasis marker, Temporal Absolute, Adverbial Absolute, Interjection, and Question word. All together combinations of words from these classes make sentences.

==== Subject, object, and locative phrases ====
The only way to expand upon the Subject, Object, or Locative is with a preceding Possessive. These connections can only occur with a single pair of words, one Possessive plus the Subject, Object, or Locative.

==== Verb phrases ====
Expansions of the Verb occur only with an Object. The Verb and the Object have an unrestricted arrangement. Both V-O and O-V occur naturally. The only exception to this free word order occurs when there are two object. When there are a pair of objects, usually a dependent and an independent object, the word order is restricted to O-O-V or O-V-O. The word order V-O-O never occurs.

==== Basic clause ====
The basic clause in Maidu contains one Verb phrase, between zero and two Subject phrases, between zero and four locative phrases, and possibly one Possessive phrase. Clauses with a Possessive are limited to a single Subject phrase. The phrases are relatively unrestricted in word order. The only exception is that Possessives always go clause finally.

The most common word order is Subject-Locative-Verb. The Verb is usually clause final, except in cases where the Possessive is present. The Subject and Locative may occur within an expanded verb phrase, making Verb-Subject-Object and Adverb-Locative-Verb potential sentence constructions.

-mym majdym-kak'an-nik'i heskym
that man-is-my friend
SUBJECT VERB SUBJECT
'That man is my friend.'

-jamanna -niktynik'an -lajmendi -'yk'oj'usas
{to the mountains} {along with my younger brother} {in the summer} {I used to go}
LOCATIVE LOCATIVE LOCATIVE VERB
I used to go to the mountains with my younger brother in the summer.'

-his'usan -'anim kylem -lolo
{used to weave} that woman baskets
VERB {} SUBJECT OBJECT
'That woman used to weave baskets.'

== See also ==
- Maidu
- Maiduan languages

== Bibliography ==
- Anderson, Karen Lahaie. (2014) Mountain Maidu Grammar, ISBN 978-1-4961-4140-8.
- Campbell, Lyle. (1997). American Indian languages: The historical linguistics of Native America. New York: Oxford University Press. ISBN 0-19-509427-1.
- Heizer, Robert F. (1966). Languages, territories, and names of California Indian tribes.
- Mithun, Marianne. (1999). The languages of Native North America. Cambridge: Cambridge University Press. ISBN 0-521-23228-7 (hbk); ISBN 0-521-29875-X.
- Shipley, William (1964). Maidu Grammar. Berkeley: University of California Press.
