= Mechoopda =

Mikćapdo
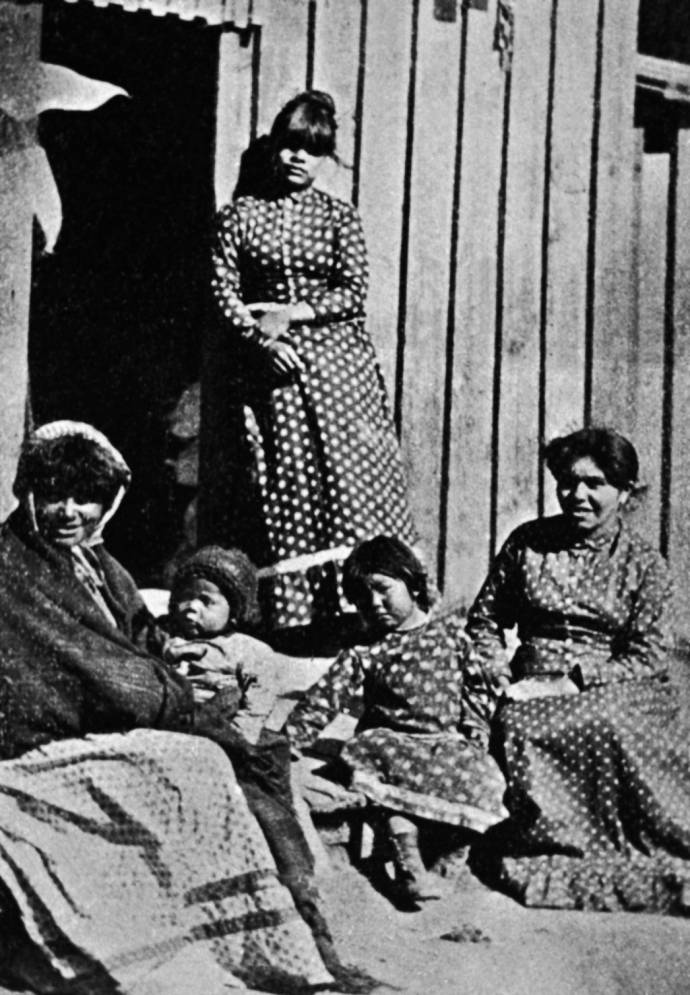
- 19th century photograph of Mechoopda women and children

Total population
- 413 enrolled members

Regions with significant populations
- California

Languages
- English, Konkow

Religion
- Christianity, traditional tribal religions

Related ethnic groups
- other Maidu people

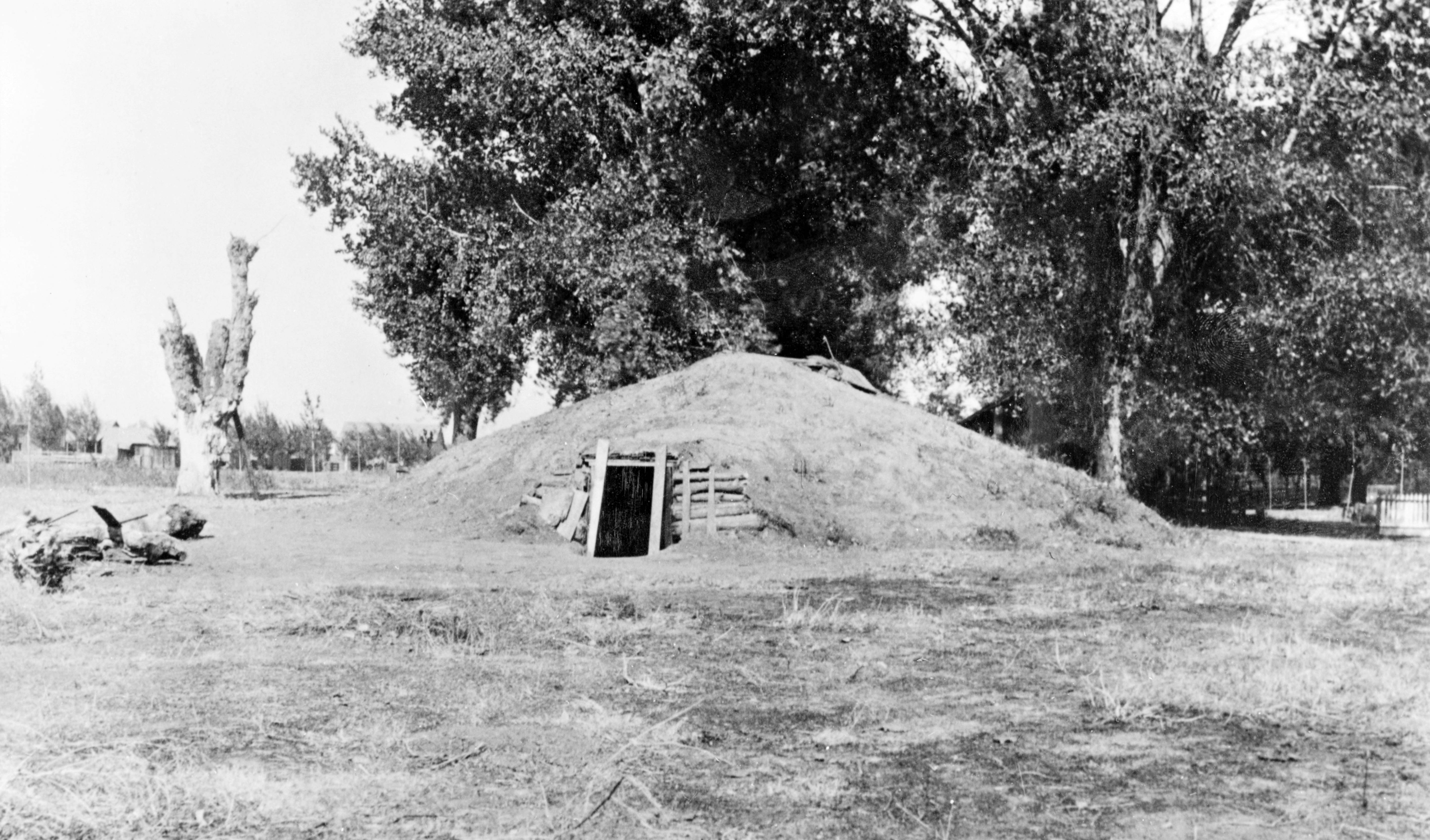
Mechoopda sweat house

The Mechoopda (Northwest Maidu: Mikćapdo) are a tribe of Maidu people, an Indigenous people of California. They are enrolled in the Mechoopda Indian Tribe of Chico Rancheria, a federally recognized tribe. Historically, the tribe has spoken Konkow, a language related to the Maidu language, and as of 2010, has created digital learning materials from old recordings of Emma Cooper, made during the 1940s as a part of the war effort.

The tribe was formerly centered in a village located about 3 1/2 miles (5.6 km) south of contemporary Chico, California. The Tribe was terminated in 1967, losing its 26-acre Chico Rancheria. Today, approximately one-half of the old Chico Rancheria is now owned by California State University, Chico (CSUC). The 11-acre university-owned portion of the former reservation is used by CSUC's agriculture, anthropology, and archaeology students.

The Mechoopda regained federal recognition in 1992.

== Government ==
The Mechoopda Indian Tribe ratified their constitution on 1 February 1998. The tribe is governed by a seven-member council. The current administration is as follows:

- Tribal Chairman: Dennis Ramirez
- Vice Chairperson: Sandra Knight:
- Treasurer: He-Lo Ramirez
- Secretary: Susie Cortez
- Member-at-Large: Lianne Bertolucci
- Member-at-Large: Jessie Kai
- Member-at-Large: Jenny Atkins

== Reservation ==
The Chico Ranchería is a federal reservation located in Butte County. The population of the tribe is 560; the population on the ranchería is approximately 70. Chico is the closest town.
