= Maiduan languages =

Small endangered language family of northeastern California

Maiduan
- Maidun, Pujunan
- Geographic distribution: California
- Ethnicity: Maidu, Konkow, Nisenan
- Linguistic classification: Penutian?: Maiduan
- Subdivisions: Maidu †; Konkow; Nisenan †; Chico † ?

Language codes
- Glottolog: maid1262
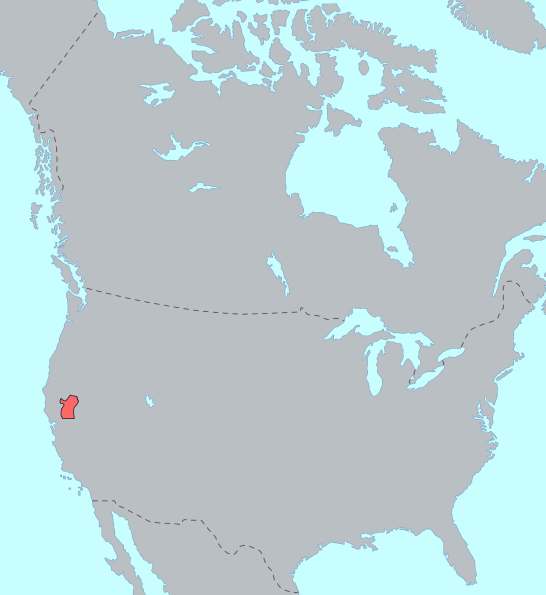
- Pre-contact distribution of Maiduan languages

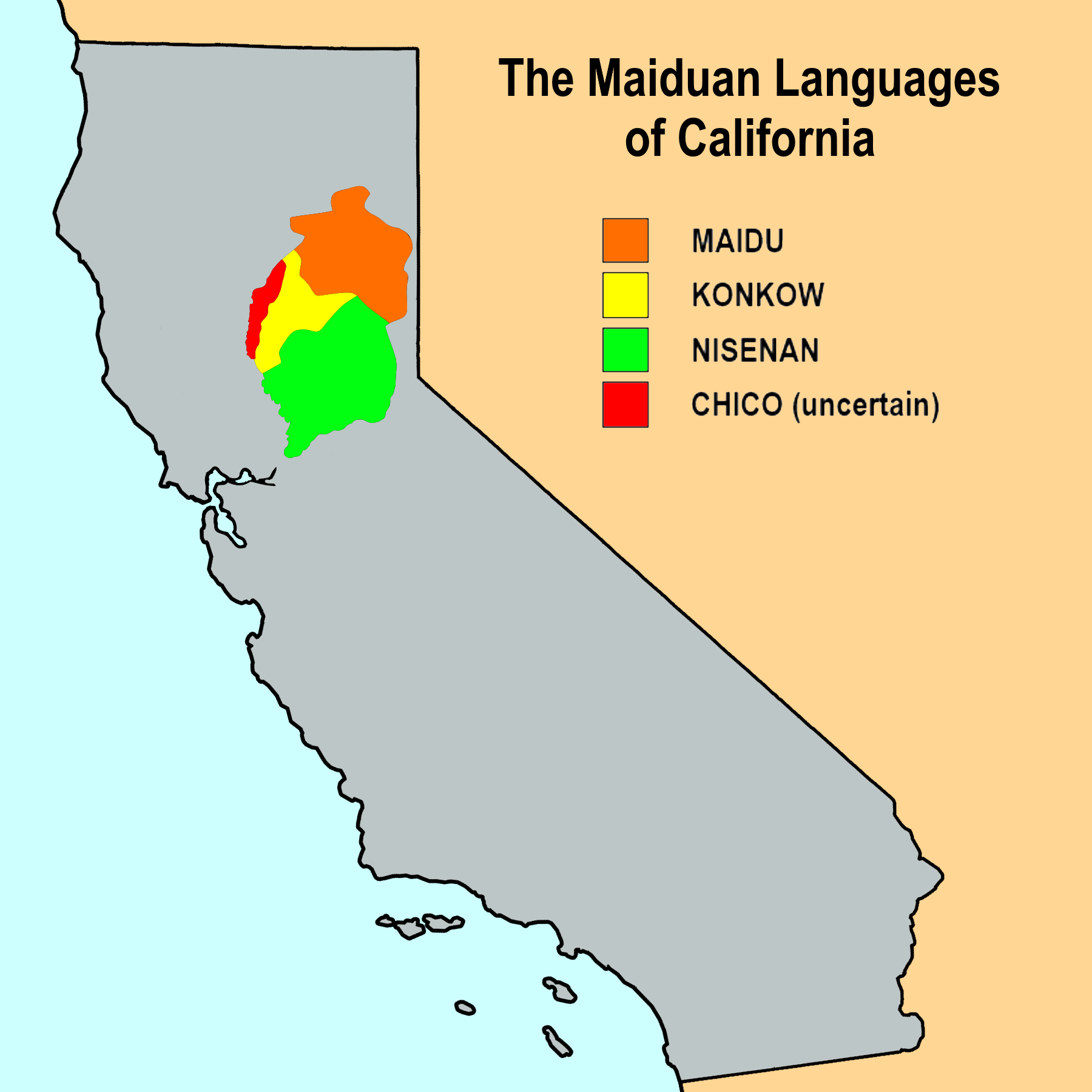
- Pre-contact distribution of Maiduan languages (California detail map)

Maiduan (also Maidun, Pujunan) is a small endangered language family of northeastern California.

== Family division ==
The Maiduan consists of four languages:

- Maiduan
  - Maidu † (also known as Maidu proper, Northeastern Maidu, Mountain Maidu)
  - Chico † (also known as Valley Maidu)
  - Konkow (also known as Northwestern Maidu)
  - Nisenan † (also known as Southern Maidu)

The languages have similar sound systems but differ significantly in terms of grammar. They are not mutually intelligible, even though many works often refer to all of the speakers of these languages as Maidu. The Chico dialects are little known due to scanty documentation, so their precise genetic relationship to the other languages probably cannot be determined (Mithun 1999), and in any case may have been not a fourth Maiduan language, but widely divergent dialects of Konkow (Ultan 1967).

Three of the languages went extinct by approximately the year 2000. Konkow was reported to have three elderly speakers in 2007.

== Genetic relations ==
Maiduan is often considered in various Penutian phylum proposals. It was one of the original members of California Penutian (the Penutian "core").

== See also ==
- Maidu

== Bibliography ==
- Callaghan, Catherine A. (1997). "Evidence for Yok-Utian", International Journal of American Linguistics, Vol. 63, No. 1 (Jan., 1997), pp. 18–64. doi:10.1086/466313 JSTOR 1265864
- Heizer, Robert F. (1966). Languages, territories, and names of California Indian tribes. University of California Press.
- Mithun, Marianne. (1999). The languages of Native North America. Cambridge: Cambridge University Press. ISBN 0-521-23228-7 (hbk); ISBN 0-521-29875-X.
- Shipley, William. (1961). "Maidu and Nisenan: A Binary Survey", International Journal of American Linguistics, Vol. 27, No. 1 (Jan., 1961), pp. 46–51. doi:10.1086/464602 JSTOR 1264141
- Ultan, Russell. (1964). "Proto-Maidun phonology," International Journal of American Linguistics, Vol. 30, No. 4 (Oct., 1964) pp. 355-370. doi:10.1086/464795 JSTOR 1263530
- Ultan, Russell. (1967). "Konkow Grammar," unpublished doctoral dissertation, University of California at Berkeley
