= Chico language =

Extinct Maiduan language of California, US

Chico
- Valley Maidu
- Native to: United States
- Region: California
- Extinct: 21st century
- Language family: Penutian?: Maiduan; Konkow?; Chico

Language codes
- ISO 639-3: vmv
- Glottolog: vall1252
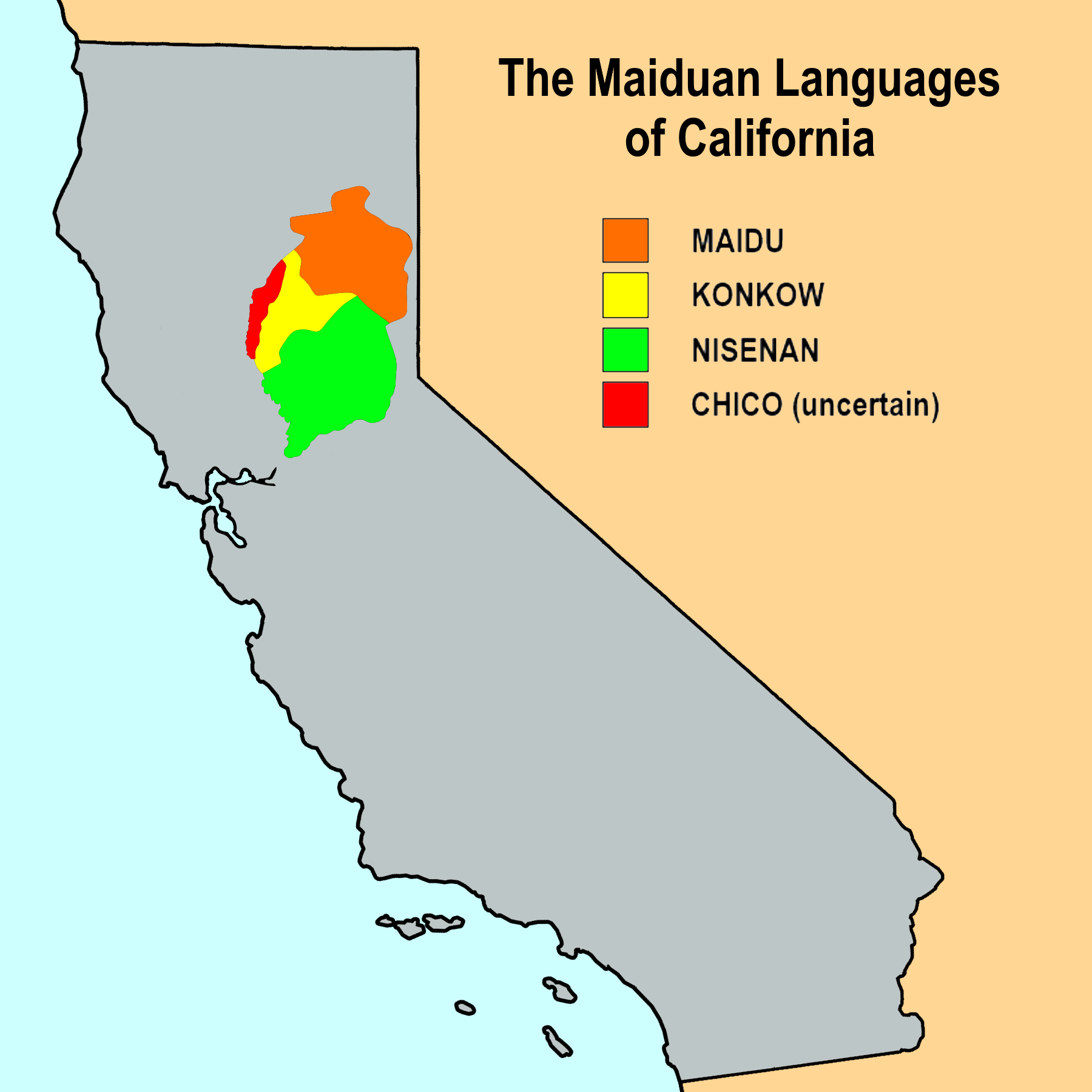
- Chico

Chico (also Valley Maidu) is an extinct Maiduan language formerly spoken by Maidu peoples who lived in Northern California, between Sacramento and the Sierra foothills. It may be a divergent dialect of Konkow or an independent language.

== See also ==
- Maidu
- Maiduan languages

== Bibliography ==
- Campbell, Lyle. (1997). American Indian languages: The historical linguistics of Native America. New York: Oxford University Press. ISBN 978-0-19-509427-5.
- Heizer, Robert F. (1966). Languages, territories, and names of California Indian tribes.
- Mithun, Marianne. (1999). The languages of Native North America. Cambridge: Cambridge University Press. ISBN 978-0-521-23228-9 (hbk); ISBN 978-0-521-29875-9.
