= Nisenan language =

Endangered Maiduan language of California

Nisenan
- Southern Maidu
- Native to: United States
- Region: California: Central California, scattered, foothills of the Sierras.
- Ethnicity: Nisenan
- Native speakers: (1-5 cited 1994)
- Language family: Penutian?: Maiduan; Nisenan
- Dialects: Valley Nisenan; Northern Hill Nisenan; Central Hill Nisenan; Southern Hill Nisenan; 9 other dialects

Language codes
- ISO 639-3: nsz
- Glottolog: nise1244
- ELP: Nisenan
- Distribution of Nisenan among the languages of California

- Nisenan is classified as Extinct by the UNESCO Atlas of the World's Languages in Danger.

Nisenan (or alternatively, Neeshenam, Nishinam, Pujuni, or Wapumni) is an extinct Maiduan language that was spoken by the Nisenan people of central California in the foothills of the Sierras, in the whole of the American, Bear and Yuba river drainages. As of 2011, there were no living native speakers of Nisenan.

There has recently been a small effort at language revival. Most notably the release of the "Nisenan Workbook" (three volumes so far) put out by Alan Wallace, which can be found at the California State Indian Museum in Sacramento and the Maidu Interpretive Center in Roseville.

As the Nisenan (like many of the Natives of central California) were not a unified nation but a collection of independent tribes which are grouped together primarily on linguistic similarity, there were many dialects to varying degrees of variation. This has led to some degree of inconsistency in the available linguistic data, primarily in regard to the phonemes.

== Phonology ==
The phonology of Nisenan is similar to both Konkow and Maidu. Taking into account the various dialects, there appears to be a fair amount of allophones across the dialects.

=== Consonants ===
		Bilabial	Alveolar	Palatal	Velar	Glottal
Nasal		m	n			
Plosive	voiceless	p	t		k	ʔ
Plosive	ejective	pʼ	tʼ		kʼ	
Plosive	implosive	ɓ ⟨b⟩	ɗ ⟨d⟩			
Affricate			ts ~ tʃ ⟨c⟩			
Fricative			s ~ ʃ			h
Approximant			l	j	w	

The single affricate consonant has been most commonly described as alveolar [ts], though some sources describe it as postalveolar [tʃ]. According to the Nisenan Workbook by Alan Wallace, [tʃ] and [ts] appear in complementary distribution. For example, the word for 'ten' is transcribed as 'maacam' (⟨c⟩ being realized as [tʃ]) in Workbook #1 and 'maatsam' in Workbook #2. Similar allophony occurs between [s] and [ʃ].

/pʼ tʼ kʼ/ have been listed as ejectives (lenis ejectives according to "Central Hill Nisenan Texts with Grammatical Sketch" by Andrew Eatough) while other sources have labeled them simply as emphatic not specifying further as to how they contrast with the plain plosives. The Nisenan Workbooks depict these in transcription, though the sound guides have yet to distinguish them from the plain plosives.

One source noted an audible click with /b/ and /d/ among some older speakers of at least one dialect of one of the Maiduan languages. The sound guides in the Nisenan Workbooks hold /b/ and /d/ as voiced plosives as in English.

Some words have a double consonant (i.e. wyttee [one], dappe [coyote], konna [girl]) but it has not been made clear as to whether this is due to gemination as the double consonants in Japanese, or just simply the same consonant being on the end of one syllable and the start of the next.

=== Vowels ===
All vowels come in long/short pairs.

	Front	Central	Back
Close	i	ɨ	u
Mid	e	ə	o
Open		a	

Long vowels are indicated by a doubling of the vowel.

/e/ is a bit lower, level with /ə/, somewhere between cardinal [e] and [ɛ].

/ɨ/ is sometimes further back, closer to cardinal [ɯ].

/u/ and /o/ are a bit lower and more centralized than the cardinal forms transcribed.

== Grammar ==
Nisenan is a moderately agglutinative language, with a degree of synthesis comparable to European languages. In common with other languages of the Maiduan family and central California in general, the grammar of Nisenan is more "noun-heavy" than may be found elsewhere in North America. It uses case markings to align arguments, rather than polypersonal verb inflection; it is not polysynthetic.

=== Nouns ===
There are eight inflected cases, all of which are suffixed to the head of the noun phrase. Nouns are divided into two classes, human and non-human; human nouns can be inflected for number and lack locative, allative, and instrumental case forms, while non-human nouns cannot be inflected for number and lack comitative case forms. The limited evidence of Nisenan means that not all case forms are attested.

Nisenan noun cases
	Suffix	tynys- "old woman"	mom- "water"	pitcaak'a- "lizard"
Nominative	-im	tynysim	momim	pitcaak'am
Accusative	-i	tynysi	momi	pitcaak'a
Genitive	-ik	tynysik		pitcaak'ak
Ablative	-naan	tynysnaan	momnaan	
Locative	-di		momdi	
Allative	-na		momna	
Comitative	-k'an	tynysk'an		
Instrumental	-ni		momim	

Number marking for human nouns is optional. The dual suffix is -wysa and the plural is -wyse. Both are placed between the noun root and the case suffix, e.g. tynys-wysa-im [tɨnɨswɨsam] "two old women".

All adjectives and determiners in the noun phrase take the nominative case, while possessors take the genitive:

Noun phrases
	Modifier	Head
Adjective	ne-im	tuke-i
Adjective	big-NOM	hole-ACC
Adjective	"[into] a big hole"	
Possessor	nisenaan-ik	jyypybyj-na
Possessor	Nisenan-GEN	maiden.dance-ALL
Possessor	"to the maidens' dance of the Nisenan"	

=== Pronouns ===
Personal, demonstrative, and interrogative / indefinite pronouns are all attested. They are inflected with some irregularities in the nominative, accusative, and genitive cases. In particular, the first and second person pronouns lack the characteristic -im nominative suffix. Ablative and comitative forms are regularly derived from the same suffixes as full nouns.

The first person dual alternates between naas and nisaam, which may denote inclusive and exclusive respectively ("you and me" vs. "me and someone else"). The non-singular second person forms are not attested in the genitive, but may be reconstructed on the basis of their first and third person counterparts.

Personal pronouns
	First			Second			Third		
	Singular "me"	Dual "us two"	Plural "us all"	Singular "you"	Dual "you two"	Plural "you all"	Singular "him, her"	Dual "those two"	Plural "them all"
Nominative	ni	naas / nisaam	nees	mi	maam	meem	myym	mysaam	myseem
Accusative	nik	nisak'a	nisee	min	mimak'a	mimee	myhe	mysaa	mysee
Genitive	nik'i	nisak'ak	niseek	mink'i	*mimak'ak	*mimeek	myk'i	mysaak	myseek

In addition, there is a third-person non-human pronoun myj, which inflects regularly in the oblique cases. As in many other languages, this third-person pronoun is similar to the demonstrative "that" (my-).

Pronouns of location include the emphatic demonstrative myjdyk "right there" and hededyk "right here", as well as hodo "that, there" and hede "this, here".

Interrogative and indefinite pronouns are also attested, albeit in only a few case-forms. Human and non-human indefinite pronouns each have two sets; the distinction between them is unclear.

Indefinite pronouns
	Human		Non-human		Determiner	Locative
	"who, someone"		"what, something"	"something"	"which one, one" (of a group)	"where, somewhere"
Nominative	menem		homaam	hiiwim		
Accusative	mene	homoky	homaa	hiiwi	homope	homo
Genitive	menek'a			hiiwnaan		
Ablative						homonaan
Locative						homodi
Allative						homona

==== Possession ====
In general, possession is marked by placing the possessor (noun or pronoun) in the genitive case before the possessed: mysaak hadyky "their things". However, a few kinship terms instead take a possessive prefix: nik-ne "my mother", min-ne "your mother", my-ne "his, her, their mother".

=== Verbs ===
Verbs in Nisenan are inflected for tense, mood, aspect, person, and number. However, the verbal paradigm is remarkably defective. The full slate of pronominal inflection is used only in the optative mood and with auxiliary verbs; realis predicates rely on auxiliaries, explicit subjects, or context.

==== Infinitives ====
The unmarked infinitive (complement to an auxiliary verb) is -i: ydawi 'to come'. It is replaced by the negative suffix -men, e.g. ydawmen 'to not come', or any tense/aspect suffix, for which see below.

==== Tense and aspect ====
Several tense/aspect suffixes are demonstrated in Eatough (1999). The most common of these in narrative texts is -mukum, a simple past: e-mukum 'saw'. An alternative past tense, perhaps with an inchoative sense and generally co-occurring with an auxiliary, is -haa: pooloj-haa mi "you got sick". Also attested are the perfective -ii, -ji (todaw-ii ni 'I have brought it'), a progressive -im (tuj-im ni 'I am sleeping'), a future tense -wis, and a stative -u.

==== Auxiliary verbs ====
There are two interrogative auxiliary verbs, be 'be' and ka 'do'. Their meanings do not align very closely with these English translations; be appears to be used more in questions relating to the present and ka in those relating to the past.

be
	First	Second	Third
Singular	bes	bemi	be
Dual	behaas	bemaam	be
Plural	behees	bemeem	be

ka
	First	Second	Third
Singular	kas	kani	ka
Dual	kahaas	kaam	ka
Plural	kahees	keem, kemeem	ka

Examples of the interrogative pronouns are mink'i be 'is it yours?' and menem ka bonda 'who fell down?'.

The affirmative auxiliary da, also glossed as 'do', is used to make positive assertions: myji dani aanik'i "I want it". It has a similar pattern of inflection except for the aberrant first-person singular dani. Its stative counterpart is my, glossed as 'be': nik'i syym my wennem syym 'my dog is a good dog'.

In addition to these, there is a root ha-, glossed as 'do' but not listed among the auxiliary verbs. This root is used extensively in narrative texts. Unlike the auxiliaries above, it does not entail explicit person marking but is rather marked for same / different subject: ha-n 'do (same subject)', ha-ce 'do (different subject)'.

==== Optative ====
The optative mood indicates that the verb's result is desired by the speaker, e.g. homaa pa-is [homaː pas] "I want to eat something", huujo-p e-men-bo [huːjop emenbo] "hide it so he doesn't see". The optative agreement suffixes are as follows. Second-person optatives can mark the absence or presence of a speaker for the assumed result, where an additional suffix -ka implies the speaker will be absent (e.g. myjaatibeneka "you should go do that"), while a distinct form -benes implies the speaker will be present.

Optative
	First	Second		Third
	First	Speaker absent	Speaker present	Third
Singular	-is	-bene(ka)	-benes	-bo
Dual	-py	-baam(ka)		-bo
Plural	-pe	-beem(ka)		-bo

==== Cautionary ====
The cautionary mood is the opposite of the optative, indicating that something might go wrong as a result of the verb: bonobys "I might get lost". The cautionary suffixes are as follows.

Cautionary
	Person
First	-bys
Second	-no
Third	-by

== Numbers ==
Note: Due to dialectal variation from tribe to tribe, some sources may have different words. These are taken from the Nisenan Workbooks.

1 = wyttee
2 = peen
3 = sap'yj
4 = cyyj
5 = maawyk
6 = tymbo
7 = top'yj
8 = peencyyj
9 = peli'o
10 = maacam
11 = maacam na wyttee (lit. 10 and 1 or 10+1; 'na' = +/and)
12 = maacam na peen (etc. for 13 and up)
20 = peenmaacam (lit. 2 10 or 2x10)
30 = sap'yjmaacam (etc. for 40 and up)
100 = maawykhaapa

== See also ==
- Nisenan
- Maidu
- Maiduan languages

== Bibliography ==
- Campbell, Lyle. (1997). American Indian languages: The historical linguistics of Native America. New York: Oxford University Press. ISBN 0-19-509427-1.
- Eatough, Andrew. (1999). Central Hill Nisenan Texts with Grammatical Sketch. Berkeley: UC Publications in Linguistics, 132.
- Heizer, Robert F. (1966). Languages, territories, and names of California Indian tribes.
- Mithun, Marianne. (1999). The languages of Native North America. Cambridge: Cambridge University Press. ISBN 0-521-23228-7 (nsz); ISBN 0-521-29875-X.
- Wallace, Alan. (2008). Nisenan Workbook #1 & #2.
