= Nisenan =

Indigenous people of California, U.S.

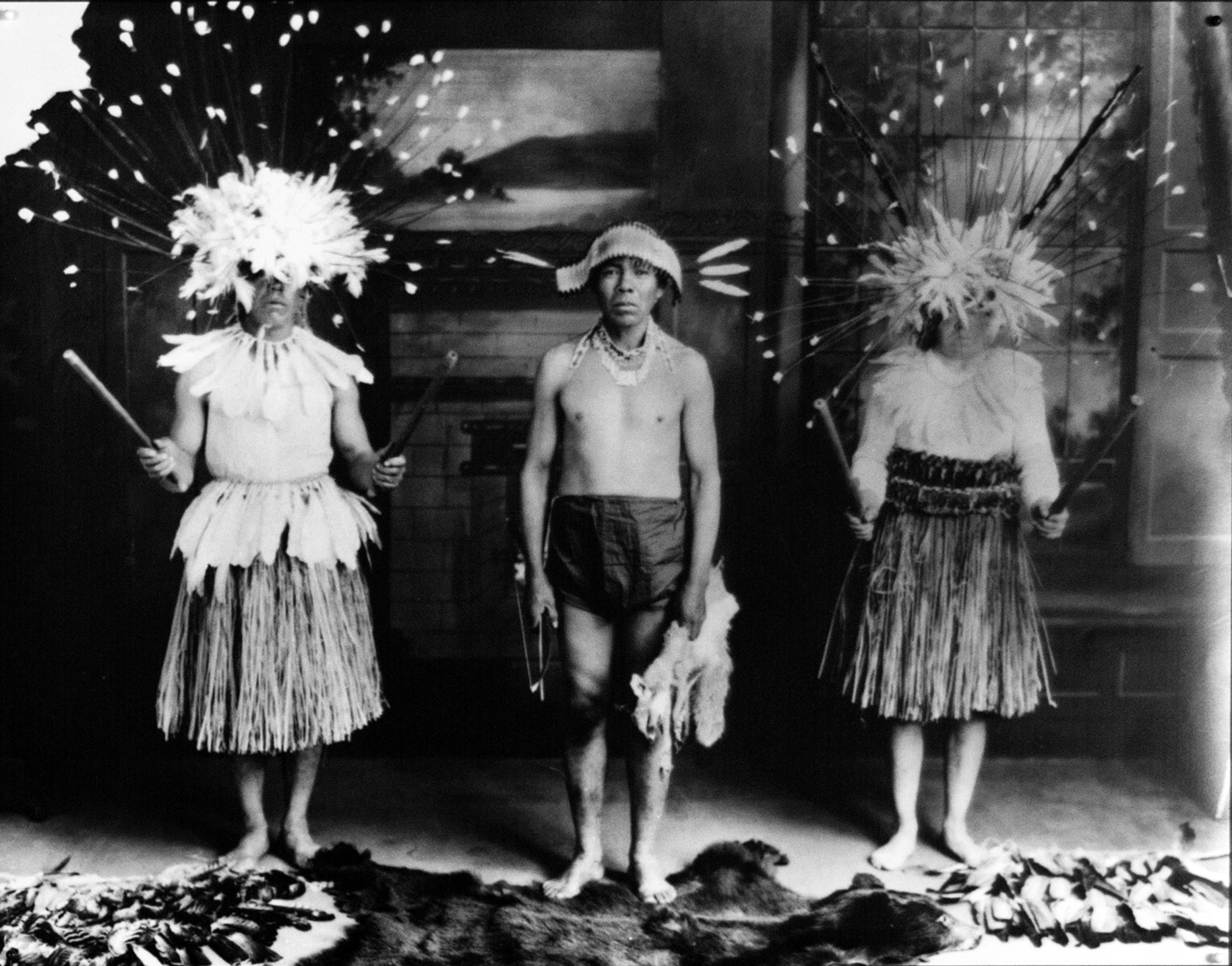
- Herbert Young (Mountain Maidu/Mechoopda Maidu), George Nye (Nisenan), and Dewey Conway (Mechoopda) in Big Head dance regalia, Chico, California

Regions with significant populations
- north-central California

Languages
- English, formerly Nisenan

Related ethnic groups
- other Maidu peoples

The Nisenan are a group of Native Americans and an Indigenous people of California from the Yuba River and American River watersheds in Northern California and the California Central Valley.

According to a 1929 archeology and ethnology press release by University of California, Berkeley, the Nisenan people are classified as part of the larger group of Native Americans known as the Maidu, though some dispute the accuracy of this relationship, including the Nisenan themselves. According to the Nisenan website, the United States' claim that they are Maidu is a misclassification and is inaccurate. As the Nisenan put it,

"Like many other Tribes throughout the United States, the Nisenan have been misidentified and mislabeled. The Nisenan have been lumped together under inaccurate labels such as "Maidu", "digger" and "southern Maidu". However, the Nisenan are a separate Tribe with their own Cultural lifeways, their own leaders and holy people, a distinct geographic territory and their own ancient and unique language."

The Nisenan have been delineated by their geographical location, and so in many texts they are further subcategorized as the Valley Nisenan, Hill Nisenan, and Mountain Nisenan. Because of these geographical barriers, the people of each region have distinct and unique customs and cultural practices. Although they have existed in these regions prior to European encounter, the people are not recognized as a tribe by the US government. The Nisenan previously had federal recognition via the Nevada City Rancheria. Some Nisenan people today are enrolled in the Shingle Springs Band of Miwok Indians, a federally recognized tribe.

== Name ==
The name Nisenan derives from the ablative plural pronoun nisena·n,.

The Nisenan have been called the Southern Maidu and Valley Maidu. While the term Maidu is still used widely, Maidu is an over-simplification of a very complex division of smaller groups or bands of Native Americans.

== Territory ==
The Nisenan live in Northern California, between the Sacramento River to the west and the Sierra Mountains to the east. The southern reach went to about Cosumnes River but north of Elk Grove and the Meadowview and Pocket regions of Sacramento, and the northern reach somewhere between the northern fork of the Yuba River and the southern fork of the Feather River.

Neighboring tribes included the Valley and North Sierra Miwok to the south, the Washoe to the east, the Konkow and Maidu to the north, and the Patwin to the west.

== History ==
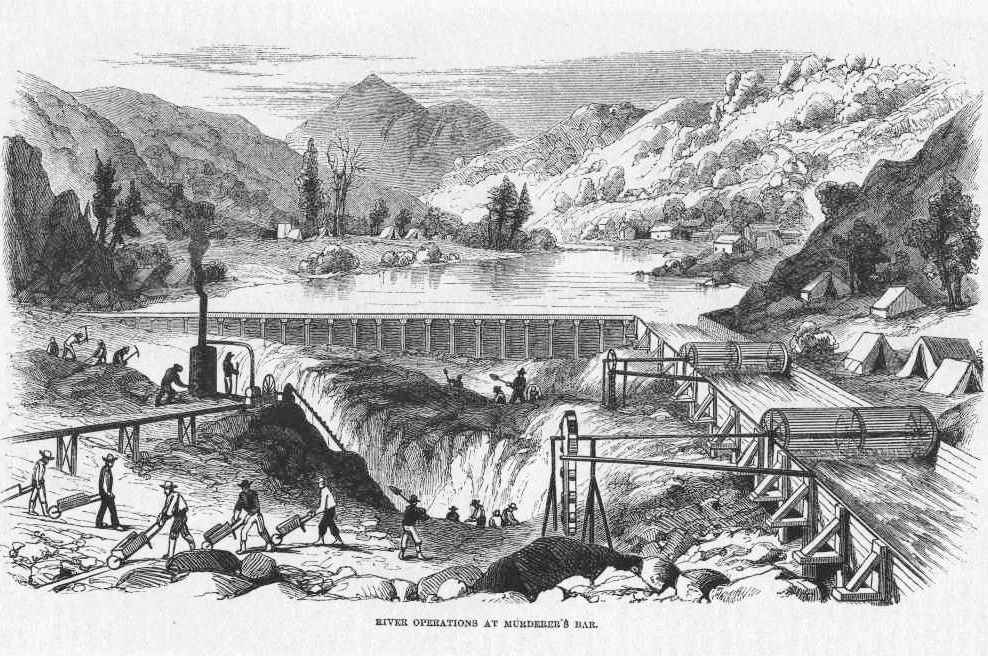

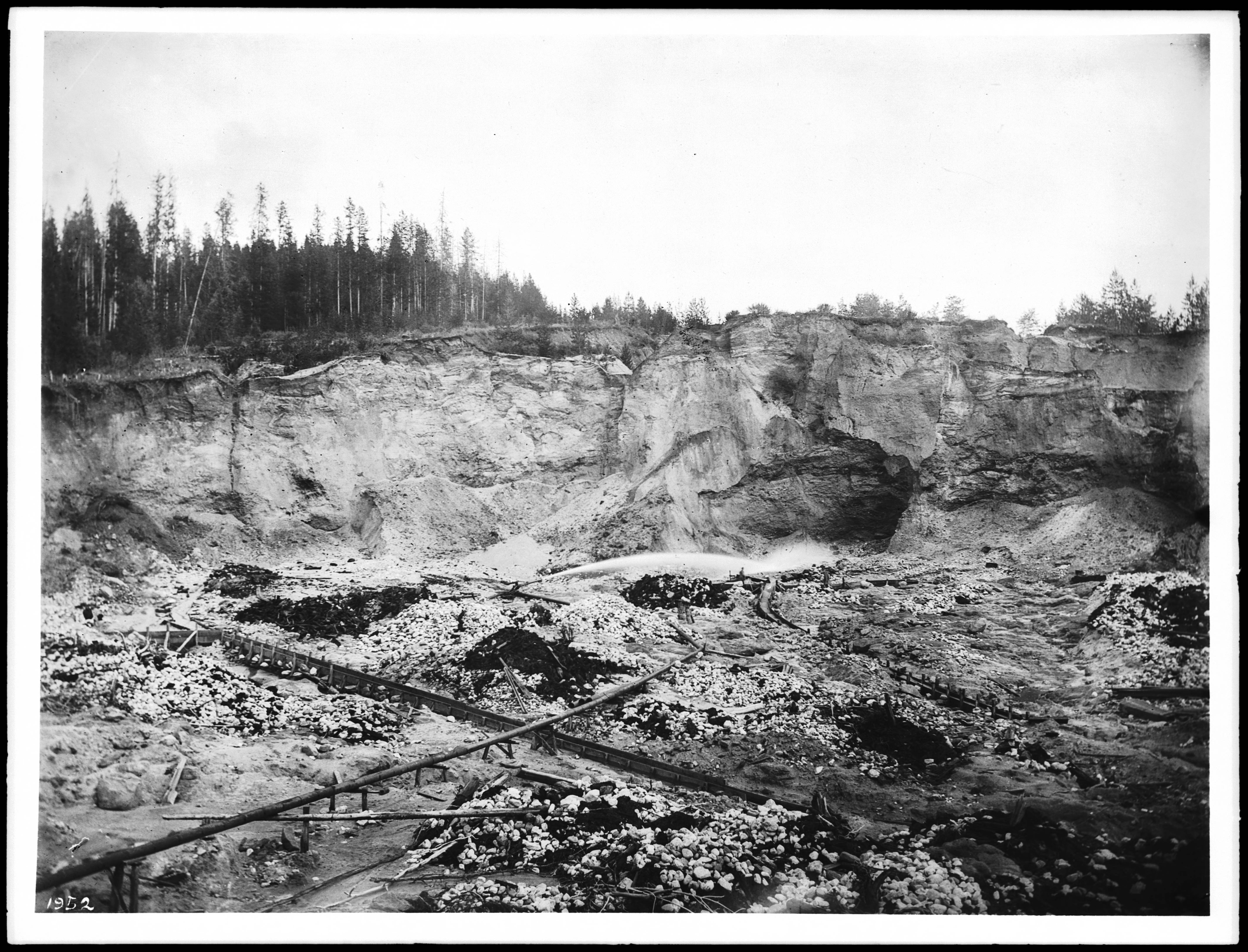
Hydraulic Mining

=== Gold Rush ===
The Nisenan were initially unaffected by European influence. In the early nineteenth century, their initial encounters with Spanish and U.S. expeditions were peaceful. In 1833, a severe malaria epidemic spread, which killed many of the Nisenan as well as other neighboring tribes.

The 1849 Gold Rush attracted hundreds of thousands of Europeans to the area, resulting in appropriation of their lands, decimation of their resources, more disease, violence, and mass murder. The influx of numerous migrants resulted in overuse of land, competition for game and water, and a strain on resources and the environment. When a drought took place, crops failed and people died of starvation.

The Nisenan population dropped precipitously from approximately 9,000 to 2,500 people by 1895. A fraction of the surviving Nisenan remained in the Sierra Nevada foothills and acquired low-wage jobs.

== Customs ==
=== Birth customs ===
Documented history about customs can be contradictory and not always reliable, as early anthropologists were often researching several regions at once, often well after disruptions and trauma to tribes had already occurred due to European contact. According to some sources, if twins were born, they and the mother were often killed.

But Richard B. Johnson, current Tribal Chairman for the Nevada City Nisenan, said, "Our elders have said that twins were not killed, but were considered fortunate if both survived during infancy. Our tribe has ancestors who are twins."

Due to a high frequency of stillborn births, the people did not make cradleboards until after the successful birth of a child. An expectant mother close to giving birth avoided cold air, salt, meat, and cold water. The umbilical cord was cut with an obsidian knife, and the end of the cord was smeared with charcoal. The mother started breastfeeding her child two days after his or her birth, and children were usually weaned at two or three years old.

After a birth, the new mother and her child remained in the birthing hut for the first 16 days, with the husband maintaining a fire day and night. The new mother slept in a seated position for the first sixteen days after birth, with a heated flat stone placed on the belly to assist with passage of the afterbirth.

A feast was essential after the sixteen days; during which the child was celebrated with relatives and a name chosen. Naming the child after an elder or ancestor was common. If there were no more names left to choose in a particular lineage, a close friend might allow the parents use of his family lineage for names.

=== Marriage customs ===
Marriage arrangements are now set by the couple themselves, but the parents chose the arrangements in older customs. Once both of their parents reached an agreement on the pairing, the couple was officially engaged. Shells and beads were gifted between the two families, and an event was arranged to celebrate their communion. Before the union was consummated, the couple was educated on their specific marital responsibilities. The man proved his ability to care for his wife by providing gifts to his in-laws.

Couples moved from the woman's home to their own place near the man's family, which is classified as patrilocal. During the process of the consummation of the marriage, the pair slept at a distance from each other for a number of nights. Each night, the man was allowed to advance closer toward the woman. The consummation was complete once they were "within touching distance."

Widows, widowers, and divorcees could remarry without an engagement period as they no longer thought to require guidance from elders. Female widows were allowed to remarry after a mourning period of six months to three years; men were allowed to remarry sooner than the women. Many women most often opted to return to their own people than to remarry. Marriage to a husband's brother was also an option. Before any decisions to remarry, permission from deceased spouse's relatives was necessary as a form of respect.

=== Death customs ===
Funeral burning rituals are one of the most prominent death ceremonies in the Nisenan community. It included cremation of the body, and also of all of the deceased person's possessions. Cremation was the most feasible practice for tribes, primarily for those of a nomadic lifestyle, due to easier transportation and to limit grave robberies. The dead were reported to mingle in the surrounding space, before going to a land of the dead, an area that did not discriminate between good or bad. The deceased were thought to have the ability to take the forms of either creatures or weather patterns, but were not welcomed by the living community. They believed there was a distinguishable boundary between the living and dead. The mention of a deceased person's name was greatly discouraged.

== Language ==
The Nisenan language encompasses 13 dialects that are as extensive as the language itself. The language is spoken in the Sierra Nevada, between the Cosumnes River and Yuba River, as well as in the Sacramento Valley between the American River and Feather River.

There were as many as 13 specific Nisenan dialects. Eight are documented.

They were previously documented as four dialects, classified as:

- Valley Nisenan
- Northern Hill Nisenan
- Central Hill Nisenan
- Southern Hill Nisenan

=== Spanish influence ===
The Spanish invaded and occupied Alta, California in the late 18th century. Franciscan missions were built in California to settle the area, spread the Roman Catholic religion, extract resources from the land, and enslave indigenous people for their labor. The Nisenan people had less interaction with Spanish settlers from the coast compared to neighboring tribes. They were relatively undisturbed by Spanish missionaries and religious missions, though Spanish and Mexican troops occasionally set foot on Nisenan land to capture enslaved indigenous people who had fled (in one particular example, many of whom were of the neighboring Miwok tribe), find livestock, or traverse the land.

== Social organization ==
The Nisenan, as with many of the tribes of central California, is not considered a strict political distinction. The people were highly decentralized, in small groups who shared a common language, with a wide spectrum on similar dialects. The Nisenan people historically lived as a number of small, self-sufficient, autonomous communities. Because each community spoke a different variation of the Nisenan language, researchers have inconsistent linguistic data on the language. Early documentation about the social organization of the tribe failed to account for the female Nisenan perspective, their voices and inclusion. Researchers concluded that the Nisenan were a patriarchal society, that they adhered to a patrilocal residence system, and followed a system of patrilineal leader succession. Because of the organization of descent, property customs also followed a patriarchal means. Women were also leaders through kinship, though not as commonplace as male leaders. Nisenan tribal families hold knowledge and memory of a shared society that was equally matriarchal|matrilineal in form and function.

== Daily life ==
=== Housing ===
The Nisenan made two distinct living structure known as Hu, and K’um. Hu was the common structure in which villagers lived. These dome-shaped homes were typically built of a combination of tule, earth and wooden poles. Their floors were strewn with foliage and a fire occupied a clear space in the center of a floor. The smoke floated out through a corresponding hole in center of the roof. Earth was also piled on the outside of the Hu for additional insulation. K’um was a partially subterranean dwelling where ceremonial practice and dances took place. These structures were more prominent in larger villages. The K’um also provided lodging for visitors. The floor of the K’um was partially dug in below ground level. The door was oriented to the east. The K’um had two to four major posts depending on its size for support.

=== Food ===
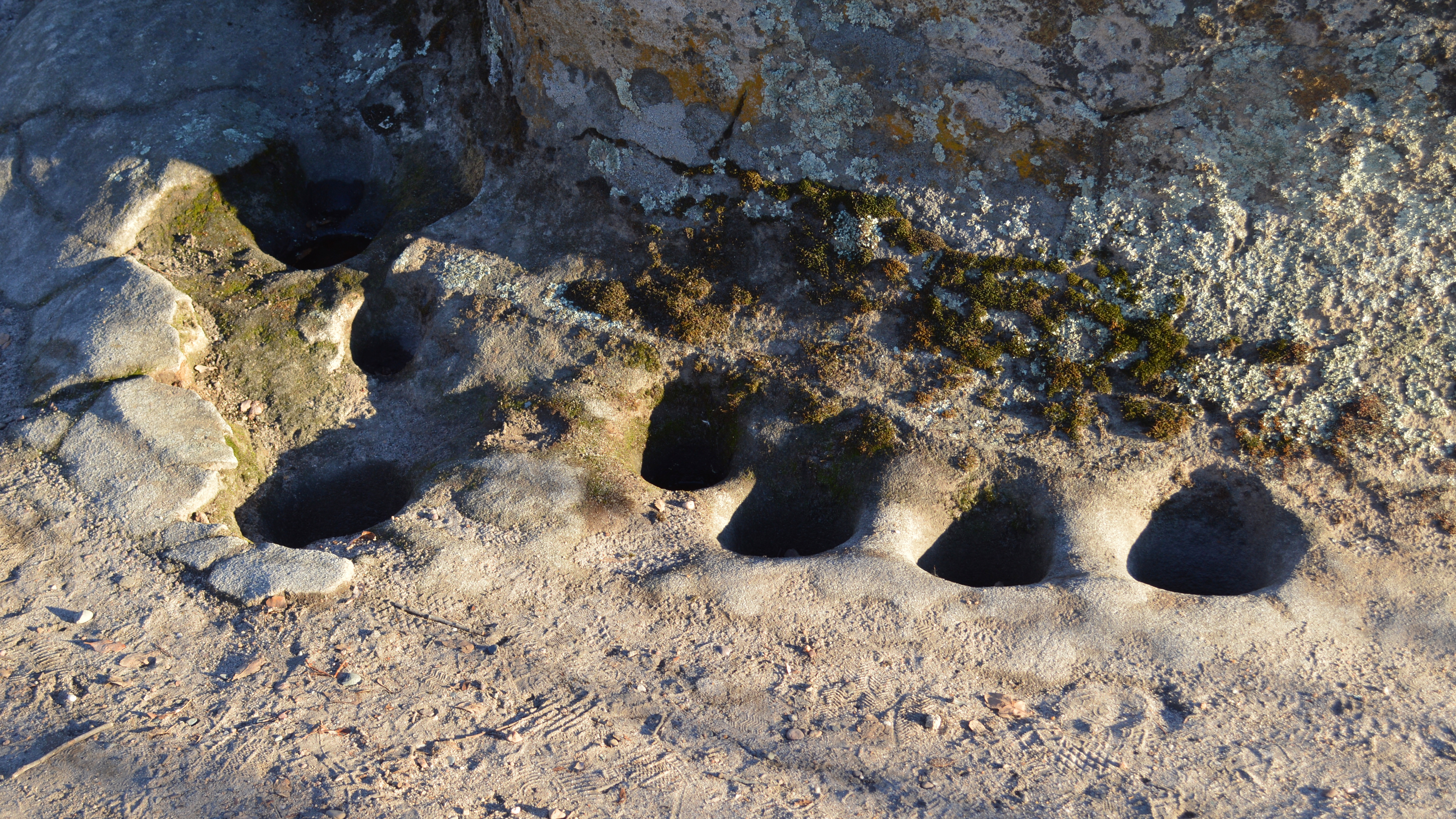
Grinding holes, Strap Ravine Nisenan Maidu Indian Site, 1970 Johnson Ranch Road, Roseville, California, 2014

An abundant source of food came from acorns. In the fall, villagers helped to forage for acorns. Long poles were used to acquire the acorns. Acorns were harvested in a granary. Acorns were then ground and made into mush, gruels, or cakes. Pine nuts, berries, and other sorts of vegetations were harvested as well. Tule root was boiled or roasted over an open fire. Men typically hunted for game. In small parties they hunted deer, elk, and rabbits. Bears were hunted during the winter months when they were hibernating. Fishing was also popular in regions close to rivers. Freshwater fish like salmon, sturgeon, and trout were amongst the most popular. Food was not only limited to vegetation and game but also insects. Grubs, earthworms, and yellow jackets were eaten. They were smoked over a fire and collected.

=== Currency and trade ===
Shell beads were used as a display of wealth and a form of currency. The beads were not shaved down by the Nisenan but were imported from coastal communities. Once worn down the shell beads were punctured, so they could be strung on strings. This currency was not always used with outside tribes. The Valley Nisenan and Hill Nisenan frequently traded with each other. The Nisenan who lived in the valley traded fish, roots, shells, beads, salt, and feathers to the Hill Nisenan. They in turn traded black acorns, pine nuts, berries, animal skins, and wood needed to make bows

== Current events ==
As of 2020, about 147 Nisenan were residing in Nevada City, California. The tribe is not recognized by the government which prevents them from receiving federal protection and financial aid. Congress enacted the Rancheria Act of 1958 in an effort to disband the Rancheria System in California. Although 27 out of 38 Rancherias as well as additional tribes have been restored throughout the past 25 years, the Nisenan were the first to be denied restoration of their Rancheria in 2015. This withheld them from federal health and housing services, education programs, and job assistance programs. Today, 87 percent of the tribe live along or below California's poverty line. Extremely high rates of under-education, under-employment, drug and alcohol addiction, domestic violence, suicide, and poor health persist within the community. The main goal of the Nisenan people is to restore their identity and re-establish representation of their tribe. Nisenan Heritage Day is held annually to showcase ceremonial dances and allow attendees insight as well as participation in traditional practices such as basket weaving. Additional efforts are put towards educating people on their language as they view it as their "connection to the land itself."

In 2024 the Nevada City Rancheria Nisenan Tribe through the 501(c)(3) non-profit California Heritage Indigenous Research Project launched its "Homeland Return" campaign to raise funds to purchase the former John Woolman School.

== See also ==
- Konkow
- Maidu
- Nisipowinan Village
