= Konkow language =

Endangered Maiduan language of California, US

Konkow
- Northwest Maidu
- Koyoom kʼawi
- Native to: United States
- Region: California
- Ethnicity: Maidu, Mechoopda
- Native speakers: few (2011)
- Language family: Penutian?: Maiduan; Konkow

Language codes
- ISO 639-3: mjd
- Glottolog: nort2951
- ELP: Konkow
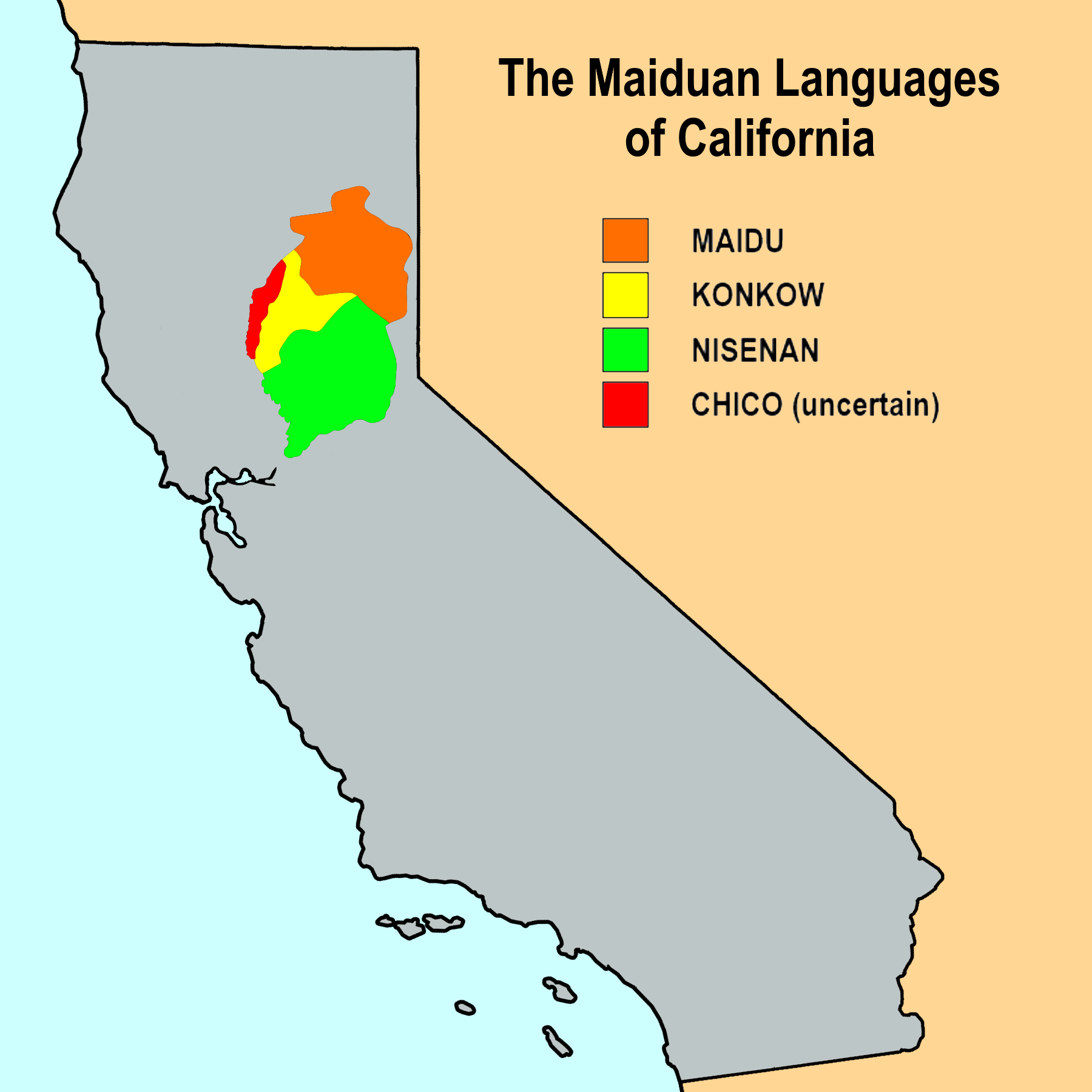
- Konkow

- Konkow is classified as Critically Endangered by the UNESCO Atlas of the World's Languages in Danger.

The Konkow language, also known as Northwest Maidu (also Concow-Maidu, or Koyoomkʼawi in the language itself) is a Maiduan language. It is spoken in California. It is virtually extinct, with three elders who learned to speak it as a first language, one of whom was deaf, surviving into the 2000s. As part of an effort to regain official recognition as a federally recognized tribe, an effort to provide language instruction amongst the descendants of the original tribe and affiliated family members has begun.

In the name Koyoom kʼawi, koyoo means "meadow", with the additional -m creating the adjective form of the word. Hence, Koyoom kʼawi would be spoken by the Koyoom kʼawim maʼa ("tribe").

== Dialects ==
One source supports the claim that Northwest Maidu had at least nine dialects, designated today according to the locality in which each was spoken. These dialects were: Otaki, Mikchopdo, Cherokee, Eskeni, Pulga, Nemsu, Feather Falls, Challenge, and Bidwell Bar. Lexica of each remain scant. In addition, there may have been many family variations within each dialect group; thus, certainly there was no one Konkow language, but Konkow means a phonologically distinct pronunciation from what is popularly defined as 'Maidu' or 'Mountain Maidu', namely in terms of stress patterns on lexicon. According to limited historical data, by the turn of the 19th century there were only four of these dialects still being spoken.

=== Alternate names ===
The name "Konkow" has been variously spelled Concow and Konkau. The language is also known as Maidu (Meidoo), Holólupai, Michopdo, Nákum, Secumne (Sekumne), Tsamak, Yuba, and the pejorative "Digger".

=== Modern Konkow ===
Since 2002, a dialect which could be called "Modern Konkow," based on what is conventionally called the Cherokee dialect of Konkow, has come into limited use by some California Native Americans with cultural and familial ties to the old Konkow tribe. This dialect is primarily based on the dialect as learned by Mary Jones, one of the last speakers of Old Konkow, who learned the dialect that was spoken in the vicinity of Cherokee, California. It is being promulgated with a DVD-based course of study called "Twenty-two Lessons in the Koyoongkʼawi Language".

As of 2010, MP3 learning materials of the Mechoopda dialect were also available, based on old recordings of Emma Cooper, made during the 1940s as a part of the war effort. Also based on the Emma Cooper recordings, a "Konkow Toddler" app was released for iPhone, iPad, and other iOS devices in July 2012.

Materials for study of the Northwest Maidu language, including the 22-lesson course mentioned above, have been made available on the website of the Konkow Maidu Cultural Preservation Association.

== Phonology ==
=== Consonants ===
		Labial	Alveolar	Palatal	Velar	Glottal
Plosive	plain	p	t		k	ʔ
Plosive	ejective	pʼ	tʼ		kʼ	ʔ
Plosive	implosive	ɓ	ɗ			ʔ
Affricate			t͡sʼ			
Fricative			s			h
Nasal		m	n			
Lateral			l			
Approximant		w		j		

The affricate /t͡sʼ/ may also be realized as [t͡ʃ]~[t͡ʃʼ] allophonically.

=== Vowels ===
	Front	Central	Back
Close	i	ɨ	u
Mid	e	ə	o
Open		a	

Vowel length is also present.
