= Native American languages of Nevada =

Nevada, a state in the western region of the United States of America, hosts a large number of Native Americans who have traditionally lived in the Great Basin, a large geographic feature of Nevada. There are four Native American languages that are spoken by recognized tribes of Nevada, three of which fall under the Uto-Aztecan languages classification (Ute, Paiute, and Shoshone), (Note: According to the Columbia Electronic Encyclopedia, Comanche is also spoken in Nevada.) while the other is an isolate. A minority language is also spoken in Nevada.

== Distribution ==
There are four Native American languages currently spoken in Nevada. Population estimates are based on figures from Ethnologue and U.S. Census data, as given in sub-pages below. The four languages are shown in the table below:

Language	Classification	Number of Speakers	Total Ethnic Population	Tribe(s) Included	Location(s) in Nevada	Significant External Populations
Washo	Language Isolate	20	1,100	Washoe Tribe of Nevada and California	Reno-Sparks Indian Colony, Carson Colony, Dresslerville Colony, Stewart Community, Washoe Ranch, Woodfords Community, Reno-Sparks Indian Colony	California
Northern Paiute	Uto-Aztecan: Numic: Western Numic	700	5,000	Northern Paiute	Lovelock Indian Colony, Fallon Reservation and Colony, Pyramid Lake Indian Reservation, Reno-Sparks Indian Colony, Duck Valley Indian Reservation, Summit Lake Indian Reservation, Walker River Indian Reservation, Winnemucca Indian Colony, Yerington Colony and Campbell Ranch, Fort McDermitt Indian Reservation	Idaho
Shoshone	Uto-Aztecan: Numic: Central Numic	2,000	12,300	Western Shoshone, Goshute, Shoshone (unspecified for Ely I.R.)	Duckwater Reservation, Ely Shoshone Indian Reservation, Fallon Reservation and Colony, Reno-Sparks Indian Colony, Duck Valley Indian Reservation, Battle Mountain Indian Reservation, Elko Indian Colony, South Fork and Odgers Ranch Indian Colony, Wells Indian Colony, Winnemucca Indian Colony, Yomba Indian Reservation, Goshute Indian Reservation, Fort McDermitt Indian Reservation	Idaho, Wyoming, Utah
Colorado River Numic	Uto-Aztecan: Numic: Southern Numic	2,000	5,000	Southern Paiute, Ute	Las Vegas Indian Colony, Moapa River Indian Reservation	Utah, Colorado, Arizona, California

== Minority languages ==
- Mojave language is spoken on the Fort Mojave Indian Reservation, which is split between Arizona, California, and Nevada, in order of decreasing land area present in each respective state. Mojave is a Yuman language.

== See also ==
- Native Americans in the United States
- Indigenous peoples of the Great Basin
- Indigenous languages of the Americas
- Uto-Aztecan languages
- Washo language
