= Field Matron's Cottage =

Historic house in Nevada, United States

- U.S. National Register of Historic Places
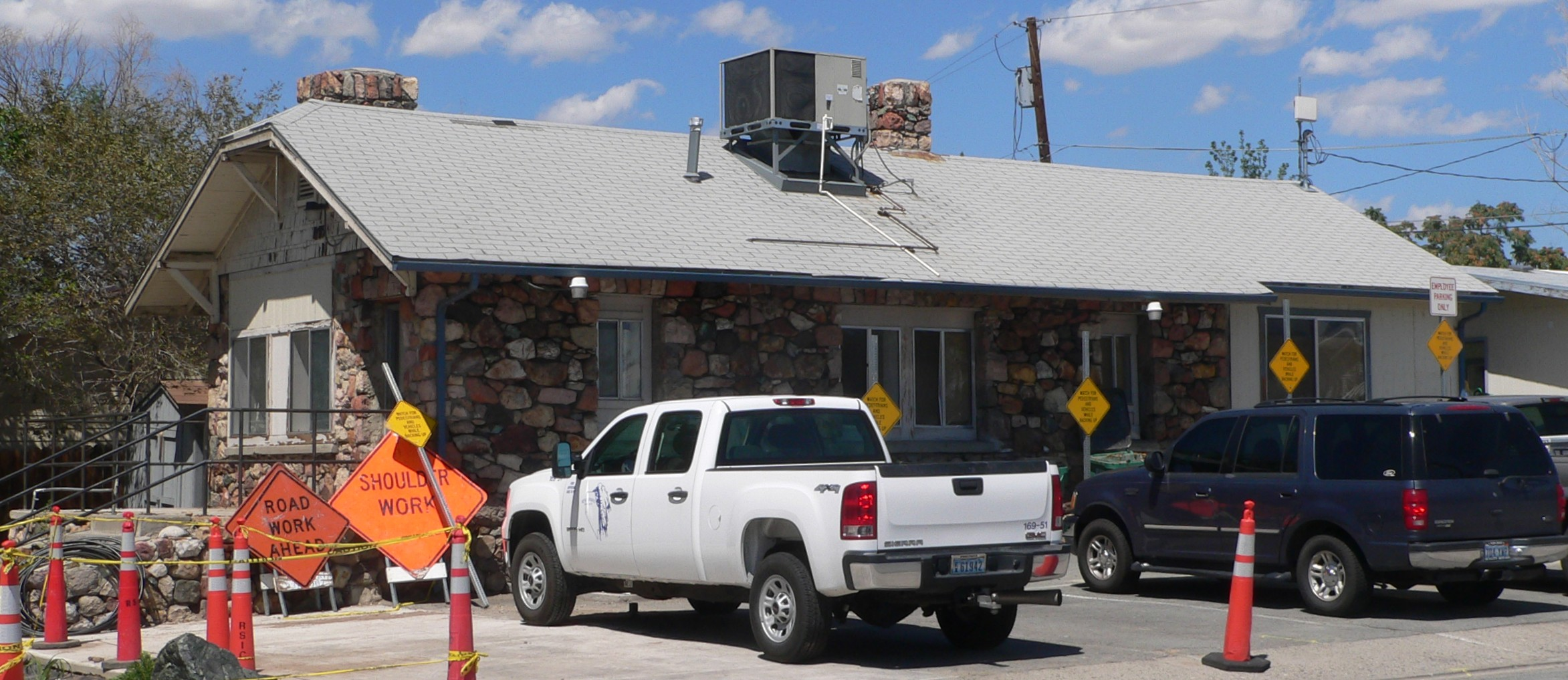
- Cottage, seen from the southeast

- Location within Nevada Location within the United States
- Location: 1995 E. Second St., Reno, Nevada
- Coordinates: 39°31′40″N 119°47′11.25″W
- Built: 1926
- Architectural style: Stewart vernacular
- NRHP reference No.: 03000416
- Added to NRHP: May 16, 2003

The Field Matron's Cottage, also known as the Stone Building, was built circa 1925 on the Reno-Sparks Indian Colony in Sparks, Nevada. The cottage was built to support a Bureau of Indian Affairs program to instruct the 20 acres (8.1 ha) colony's Paiute and Washoe girls in sanitation and housekeeping skills. A "field matron" was provided by the Bureau from 1919 to as late as 1938. At first the matron lived in Reno, at some distance from the colony, but in 1926 funding was made available to build a dwelling on colony lands, allowing a closer relationship between the matron and the colony's inhabitants. The cottage included a library and an infirmary, and served as a community meeting place.

The cottage is built in the locally-unique Stewart Vernacular style, following the prototype established at the Stewart Indian School in Carson City. Many of the buildings at the Stewart Indian School were built using multi-colored native stone with black mortar. The style was locally influential, but the Matron's Cottage is the only example in the Reno area. The building's detailing and massing are similar to the Craftsman style, with a bungalow-like arrangement. The one story building has a full basement and a jerkin-head gable roof.

The Field Matron's Cottage was placed on the National Register of Historic Places in 2003.
