= Tribe (Native American) =

Formal Native American tribe recognized by the American federal government

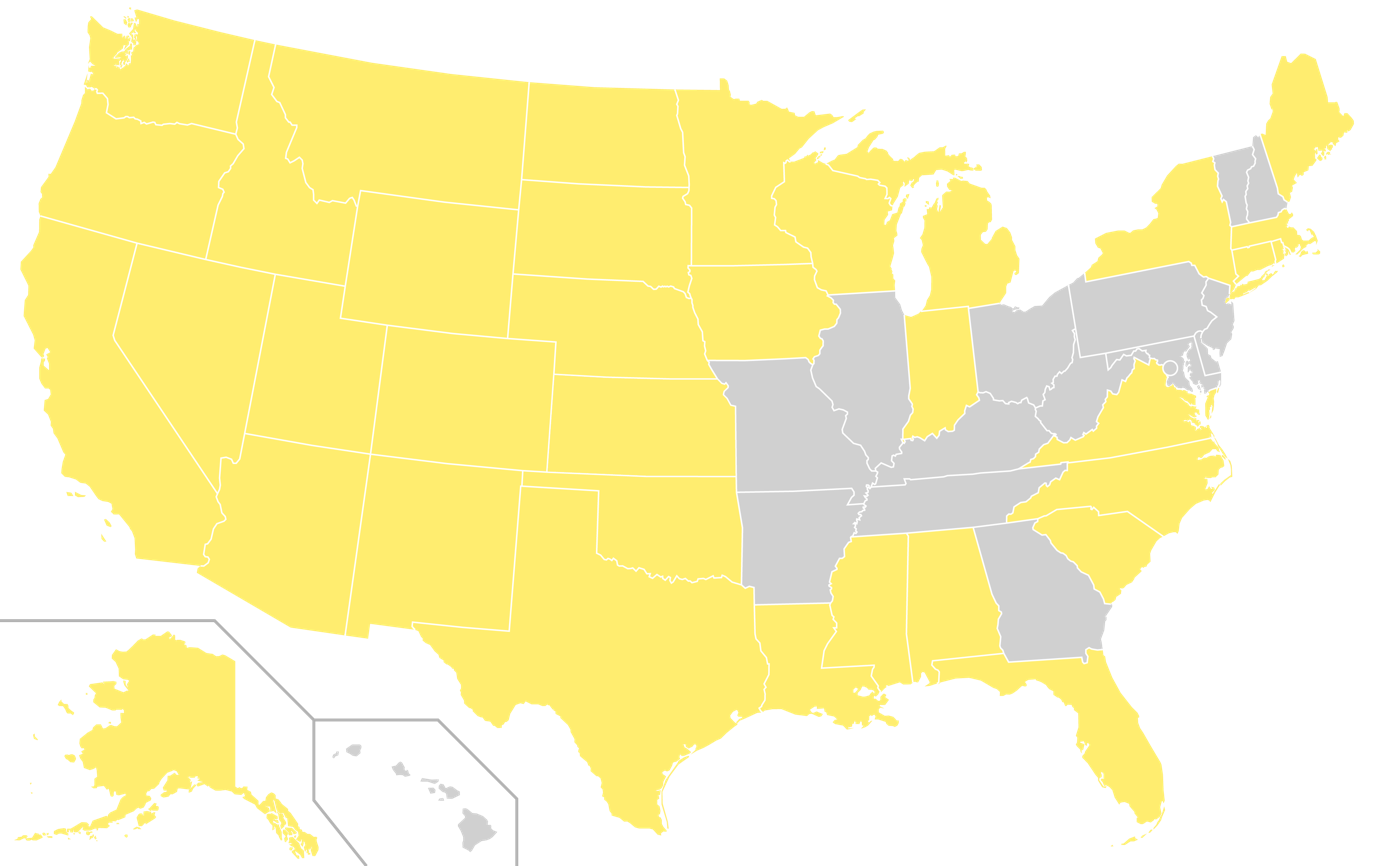
Map of current states with U.S. federally recognized tribes marked in yellow and states with no federally recognized tribes marked in gray

In the United States, an American Indian tribe, Native American tribe, Alaska Native village, Indigenous tribe, or Tribal nation may be any current or historical tribe, band, or nation of Native Americans in the United States. Modern forms of these entities are often associated with land or territory of an Indian reservation. "Federally recognized Indian tribe" is a legal term in United States law with a specific meaning.

A Native American tribe recognized by the United States government possesses tribal sovereignty, a "domestic dependent, sovereign nation" status with the U.S. federal government that is similar to that of a state in some situations, and that of a nation in others, holding a government-to-government relationship with the federal government of the United States.

== Legal definition in the United States ==
The term "tribe" is defined in the United States for some federal government purposes to include only tribes that are federally recognized by the Bureau of Indian Affairs (BIA), and those Alaska Native tribes established pursuant to the Alaska Native Claims Settlement Act [43 U.S.C. 1601 et seq.]. Such tribes, including Alaska Native village or regional corporations recognized as such, are known as "federally recognized tribes" and are eligible for special programs and services provided by the United States. The BIA, part of the US Department of the Interior, issues Certificate of Degree of Indian Blood, which tribes use as a basis for tribal enrollment in most cases. Federally recognized tribes are "unique governmental entities and are not extensions of State or local governments."

== Other uses ==
In addition to their status as legal entities, tribes have political, social, and historical rights and responsibilities. The term also refers to communities of Native Americans who historically inhabit a particular landbase and share a language and culture.

== See also ==
- Band government
- Classification of Indigenous peoples of the Americas
- Indian reservation
  - Indian colony
- Indigenous law
- List of Alaska Native tribal entities
- List of federally recognized tribes in the United States
- List of federally recognized tribes by state
- List of organizations that self-identify as Native American tribes
- Native American name controversy
- Native Hawaiians
- State-recognized tribes in the United States
- Tribal council (United States)
