= Washo language =

North American language isolate

Washo
- Washoe
- wá·šiw ʔítlu
- Native to: United States
- Region: California–Nevada border
- Ethnicity: Washoe people
- Native speakers: 20 (2011)
- Revival: 1994
- Language family: Language isolate or Hokan ?

Language codes
- ISO 639-2: was
- ISO 639-3: was
- Glottolog: wash1253
- ELP: Washo
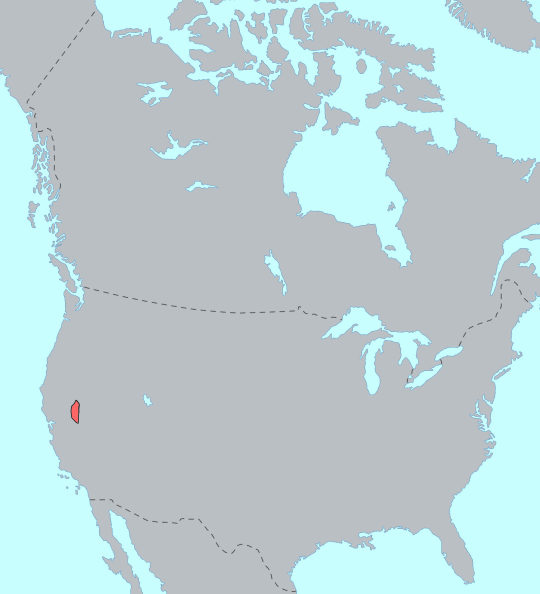
- Pre-contact distribution of the Washo language

- Person: wá·šiw
- People: waší·šiw
- Language: wá·šiw ʔítlu
- Country: waší·šiw Ɂítdeh

Washo or Washoe (/ˈwɒ.ʃoʊ/; endonym wá·šiw ʔítlu) is an endangered Native American language isolate spoken by the Washo on the California–Nevada border in the drainages of the Truckee and Carson Rivers, especially around Lake Tahoe. While there were only 20 elderly native speakers of Washo as of 2011, since 1994 there had been a small immersion school that has produced a number of moderately fluent younger speakers. The immersion school has since closed its doors and the language program operates through the Cultural Resource Department for the Washoe Tribe. The language remains very endangered; however, there has been a renaissance in the language revitalization movement as many of the students who attended the original immersion school have become teachers.

Ethnographic Washo speakers belonged to the Great Basin culture area and they were the only non-Numic group of that area. The language has borrowed from the neighboring Uto-Aztecan, Maiduan and Miwokan languages and is connected to both the Great Basin and Northern California sprachbunds.

== History ==
In 2012, Lakeview Commons Park in South Lake Tahoe was renamed in the Washo language. "The Washoe Tribe has presented the name Tahnu Leweh (pronounced approx. [tanu lewe]) which, in native language, means "all the people's place." It is a name the Tribe would like to gift to El Dorado County and South Lake Tahoe as a symbol of peace, prosperity and goodness."

== Classification ==
Washo is usually considered a language isolate. That is, it shares no demonstrated link with any other language, including its three direct neighboring languages, Northern Paiute (a Numic language of Uto-Aztecan), Maidu (Maiduan), and Sierra Miwok (Utian). It is sometimes classified as a Hokan language, but this language family is not universally accepted among specialists, nor is Washo's connection to it.

The language was first described in A Grammar of the Washo Language by William H. Jacobsen, Jr., in a University of California, Berkeley, PhD dissertation and this remains the sole complete description of the language. There is no significant dialect variation. (Jacobsen's lifelong work with Washo is described at the University of Nevada Oral History Program.)

== Dialects ==
Washo shows very little geographic variation. Jacobsen (1986:108) wrote, "When there are two variants of a feature, generally one is found in a more northerly area and the other in a more southerly one, but the lines separating the two areas for the different features do not always coincide."

== Phonology ==
=== Vowels ===
	Front		Central		Back	
	short	long	short	long	short	long
Close	i	iː	ɨ	ɨː	u	uː
Mid	e	eː			o	oː
Open			a	aː		

There are six distinct vowel qualities found in the Washo language, each of which occurs long and short. The sound quality of a vowel is dependent upon their length and the consonant they precede, as well as the stress put on the vowel.

Washo vowels
Orthography	IPA	Example
á or a á· or a·	/a/ /aː/	lak’aʔ 'one' dá·bal 'sagebrush'
é or e é· or e·	/e/ /eː/	demémew 'his rib' mé·hu 'boy'
í or i í· or i·	/i/ /iː/	dipúlul 'my car' sí·su 'bird'
ó or o ó· or o·	/o/ /oː/	nanhólwa 'golden currant' ćidó·dokhu 'robin'
ú or u ú· or u·	/u/ /uː/	gukú· 'owl' šú·gil 'sunflower'
ɨ ɨ·	/ɨ/ /ɨː/	ćɨkɨ (spider)

Vowels marked with the acute accent ( ´ ) are pronounced with stress, such as in the Washo ćigábut (summer).

In Washo, vowels can have either long or short length qualities; the longer quality is noted by appending a middle dot ⟨·⟩ to the vowel (a colon ⟨:⟩ was used in Jacobsen’s orthography, and a double vowel letter in Melba Rakow’s orthography), as in the above example míši milí·giyi. Vowels with such a mark are usually pronounced for twice the normal length. This can be seen in the difference between the words móko (shoes) mó·ko (knee). However, vowels pronounced this way may not always be followed by a middle dot.

Jacobsen described in detail various vowel alternations that distinguished the Washo speech communities.

=== Consonants ===
		Bilabial	Alveolar		Palatal	Velar	Glottal
		Bilabial	plain	sibilant	Palatal	Velar	Glottal
Plosive/ Affricate	tenuis	p	t			k	ʔ
Plosive/ Affricate	ejective	pʼ	tʼ	t͡sʼ		kʼ	
Plosive/ Affricate	voiced	b	d	dz		g	
Fricative				s	ʃ		h
Nasal	voiceless	m̥				ŋ̊	
Nasal	voiced	m	n			ŋ	
Approximant	voiceless		l̥		j̊	w̥	
Approximant	voiced		l		j	w	

In the area around Woodfords, California, the local Washo dialect substituted [θ] for /s/, thus, sí·su 'bird' was pronounced thithu.

Sequences not represented by a single letter in Washo almost always tend to occur in borrowed English words, such as the nd in k’indí (candy).

Washo consonants
Orthography	IPA	Example
p	/p/	paćil "pus"; lapɨš "my body"; dawmaʔgá·p "wet place"
t	/t/	taniw "Miwok"; data·gil "his knife"; t’á·t’at "magpie"
k	/k/	kaŋa 'cave'; maku 'decayed tooth'; bá·ćuk 'ammunition'
ʔ	/ʔ/	daʔaw "lake"; dá·daʔ
p’	/p’/	p’á·wa "in the valley"; dá·p’á·pɨš "his lungs"
t’	/t’/	t’á·gim "pinenut"; t’á·t’at "magpie"
ć	/t͡s’/	ćámduʔ "chokecherry"; dićáćaʔ "my chin"
k’	/k’/	k’á·ŋi "it's roaring'; k’á·k’aʔ "heron"
b	/b/	bá·ćuk "ammunition"; dá·bal "sagebrush"
d	/d/	da·bal "sagebrush"; dá·daʔ "bed"
z	/d͡z/	gá·zagaza "a type of bird"
g	/ɡ/	gá·zagaza "a type of bird"; t’á·gim "pinenut"
s	/s/	súkuʔ "dog"; ya·saʔ "again"; ʔayɨs "antelope"
š	/ʃ/	šáwaʔ "white fir"; dišášaʔ "my mother"s sister'; wá·laš "bread"
h	/h/	hélmeʔ "three"; ʔa·huyi "they are standing"
m	/m/	má·mayʔ "conical burden basket, used for pine nuts"; bá·muš "muskrat"; t’á·gim "pinenut"
n	/n/	nanholwa "golden currant"; á·ni "ant"
ŋ	/ŋ/	ŋáwŋaŋ "child"
l	/l/	lak’aʔ "one"; wá·laš "bread"; paćil "pus"
w	/w/	wá·laš "bread"; p’a·wa "in the valley"; daʔaw "lake"
y	/j/	ya·saʔ "again"; dayáʔ "leaf"
M	/m̥/	Mášdɨmmi "he's hiding'
Ŋ	/ŋ̊/	dewŊétiʔ "hillside sloping down"
L	/l̥/	madukwáwLu "sunflower"
W	/w̥/	Wáʔi "he's the one who"s doing it"
Y	/j̊/	t’á·Yaŋi "he's hunting"

== Morphology ==
Washo has a complex tense system.

Washo uses partial or total reduplication of verbs or nouns to indicate repetitive aspect or plural number. Washo uses both prefixation and suffixation on nouns and verbs.

=== Verbs ===
Verbal inflection is rich with a large number of tenses. Tense is usually carried by a suffix that attaches to the verb. The tense suffix may signal recent past, intermediate past, the long-ago-but-remembered past, the distant past, the intermediate future, or the distant future. For example, the suffix -leg indicates that the verb describes an event that took place in the recent past, usually earlier the previous day as seen in the Washo sentence, dabóʔo lew búʔlegi ('the white man fed us').

Vowel Suffixes
Suffix	Meaning	Used	Example
-ayʔ	intermediate past	earlier than the current day, but not the distant past	di hulúyay ('I fell over')
-gul	long ago, remembered past	within the lifetime of the speaker	gedí yeyemi ʔúšgulaygi ('They used to call him that')
-lul	distant past	before the lifetime of the speaker	ga móŋil halúliya ('They planted it here long ago')
-a	recent past	action just finished	lép’amaʔ ('I got there')
-i	present	actions currently in progress	míši milí·giyi ('I see you')
-aša	near future	soon	dimú sek hayášaʔi ('I will choke him')
-tiʔ	intermediate future	within the day	ʔilćáćimiʔ etiʔi ('It's getting green.' It will be green)
-gab	distant future	the following day or later	milí·gi gabigi ('I will see you.' 'See you later')

=== Nouns ===
Possession in Washo is shown by prefixes added to the object. There are two sets of prefixes added: the first set if the object begins with a vowel and the second set if the object begins with a consonant.

Noun Prefixes
Vowel-initial Prefix	Usage	Example
l-	first-person possessive	láŋal ('my/our house')
m-	second-person possessive	máŋal ('your house')
t’-	third-person possessive	t’áŋal ('his/her/its/their house')
d-	unidentified possessive	dáŋal ('somebody's house')
Consonant-initial Prefix	Usage	Example
di-	first-person possessive	diháŋa ('my/our mouth')
ʔum-	second-person possessive	ʔumháŋa ('your mouth')
da-	third-person possessive (when first vowel of the object is a or o)	daháŋa ('his/her/its/their mouth') dak’ómol ('his/her/its/their ball')
de-	third person possessive (when first vowel of the object is e, i, ɨ, or u')	deMélɨw ('his/her/its/their belt') dedí·geš ('his/her/its/their net') debɨk’ɨ ('his/her/its/their grandmother's sister') degúšuʔ ('his/her/its/their pet')
	unidentified possessive	háŋa ('somebody's mouth')

== See also ==
- Washoe tribe
- Native American languages

== Sources ==
- Bright, William O. (2007). "North American Indian Languages". Encyclopædia Britannica. pp. 762–767.
- Campbell, Lyle (1997). American Indian languages: The historical linguistics of Native America. New York: Oxford University Press. ISBN 0-19-509427-1.
- d'Azevedo, Warren L. (1986). "Washoe". In d'Azevedo, Warren L. (ed.). Handbook of North American Indians. Vol. 11: Great Basin. Washington, DC: Smithsonian Institution. pp. 466–498. ISBN 0-16-004578-9.
- Goddard, Ives, ed. (1996). Handbook of North American Indians. Vol. 17: Languages. Washington, DC: Smithsonian Institution. ISBN 0-16-048774-9.
- Greenberg, Joseph H. (1987). Language in the Americas. Stanford: Stanford University Press.
- Jacobsen, William Jr. (1964). A Grammar of the Washo Language. Berkeley: University of California Press.
- Jacobsen, William H. (1986). "Washoe Language". In d'Azevedo, Warren L. (ed.). Handbook of North American Indians. Vol. 11: Great Basin. Washington, DC: Smithsonian Institution. pp. 107–112. ISBN 0-16-004578-9.
- Jacobsen, William H. (1996). Beginning Washo (PDF). Occasional Papers. Vol. 5. Nevada State Museum. Archived from the original (PDF) on July 27, 2021.
- Kaufman, Terrence (1988). "A Research Program for Reconstructing Proto-Hokan: First Gropings". In DeLancey, Scott (ed.). Papers from the 1988 Hokan–Penutian Languages Workshop. Publications of the Center for Amerindian Linguistics and Ethnography. Vol. 1. Eugene, Oregon: Department of Linguistics, University of Oregon. pp. 50–168.
- Mithun, Marianne (1999). The languages of Native North America. Cambridge: Cambridge University Press. ISBN 0-521-23228-7.
- "The Washo Project". The University of Chicago. 2008.
- Yu, Alan C. L. (2006). "Quantity, stress and reduplication in Washo". Phonology. 22 (3): 437. doi:10.1017/S0952675705000679.
