= Indian colony =

Urban Aboriginal American settlements in the United States

An Indian colony is a Native American settlement associated with an urban area. Although some of them became official Indian reservations, they differ from most reservations in that they are placed where Native Americans could find employment in mainstream American economy. Many were originally formed without federal encouragement or sanction.

== Locations and establishment ==
Indian colonies are especially common in Nevada. As the Great Basin ecosystem is very fragile, native lifeways became untenable soon after white settlement due to livestock over-grazing, water diversions and the felling of Pinyon pine groves. At that time there were few official reservations in the area, and those that did exist were poorly run, even by contemporary standards. Many Native Americans chose instead to seek jobs in white ranches, farms and cities. The areas in which they settled became known as Indian Camps or Colonies. In some cases they owned the land they settled on, in other cases they settled on public land. Starting in the early twentieth century, the federal government began establishing Indian trust territories for the colonies on public land.

Following the Indian Reorganization Act of 1934, many of the Indian colonies gained federal recognition as tribes. Many of the tribes formed this way are unusual in that they include members from different nations. For example, the Reno-Sparks Indian Colony has members with Washoe, Paiute and Shoshone heritage.

== Examples ==
The following is an incomplete list of Indian Colonies in the United States:

| Indian Colony | Group |
|---|---|
| Battle Mountain, Nevada | Te-Moak Tribe of Western Shoshone Indians of Nevada, Battle Mountain Band |
| Bishop, California | Bishop Colony |
| Burns, Oregon | Burns Paiute Indian Colony |
| Bridgeport, California | Bridgeport Paiute Indian Colony of California |
| Carson City, Nevada | Washoe Tribe of Nevada and California, Carson Community Council |
| Dresslerville, Nevada | Washoe Tribe of Nevada and California, Dresslerville Council |
| Elem, California | Elem Indian Colony |
| Elko, Nevada | Te-Moak Tribe of Western Shoshone Indians of Nevada, Elko Band |
| Ely, Nevada | Ely Shoshone Tribe of Nevada |
| Fallon, Nevada | Paiute-Shoshone Tribe of the Fallon Reservation and Colony |
| Las Vegas, Nevada | Las Vegas Tribe of Paiute Indians of the Las Vegas Indian Colony |
| Lovelock, Nevada | Lovelock Paiute Tribe of the Lovelock Indian Colony |
| Reno, Nevada | Reno-Sparks Indian Colony |
| Carson City, Nevada | Washoe Tribe of Nevada and California, Stewart Community Council |
| Wells, Nevada | Te-Moak Tribe of Western Shoshone Indians of Nevada, Wells Band |
| Winnemucca, Nevada | Winnemucca Indian Colony of Nevada |
| Woodfords, California | Washoe Tribe of Nevada and California, Woodfords Community Council |
| Yerington, Nevada | Yerington Paiute Tribe of the Yerington Colony and Campbell Ranch |

== See also ==
- Indian reservation
- Urban Indian reserve, Canada
- Ranchería
- Rancherie, Canada
- Oklahoma Tribal Statistical Area
- Tampa Indian Reservation
- Urban Indian
