= Lee Creek (Nevada) =

Stream in Nevada, U.S.

Coordinates: 40°34′06″N 115°36′27″W

Lee Creek is a stream in the U.S. state of Nevada. The stream is a tributary of the South Fork Humboldt River. The confluence is adjacent to the community of Lee.

Lee Creek was named after Robert E. Lee (1807–1870), an American Civil War general.
