= Lee, Nevada =

- Populated place
- Location within the state of Nevada
- Coordinates: 40°34′06″N 115°36′27″W
- Country: United States
- State: Nevada
- County: Elko
- Elevation: 5,735 ft (1,748 m)
- Time zone: UTC-8 (Pacific (PST))
  - Summer (DST): UTC-7 (PDT)
- GNIS feature ID: 863273

Lee is an unincorporated community in Elko County, Nevada, United States. The community is located on the reservation land belonging to, and constituting the sole organized community of, the South Fork Band of the Te-Moak Tribe of Western Shoshone Indians of Nevada. Lee is located at the western foothills of the Ruby Mountains range, within the Elko Micropolitan Statistical Area.

== History ==
A post office was established at Lee in 1882. The community takes its name from Lee Creek, which flows near the site.
