= Pueblo linguistic area =

The Pueblo linguistic area (or Pueblo Sprachbund, Pueblo convergence area) is a Sprachbund (group of languages with similarities due to language contact) consisting of the languages spoken in and near North American Pueblo locations. There are also many shared cultural practices in this area. For example, these cultures share many ceremonial vocabulary terms meant for prayer or song.

== Language membership ==
The languages of the linguistic area are the following:

- Zuni language
- Tanoan family
- Keresan language
- Hopi language
- Navajo language

The languages belong to five different families: Zuni, Tanoan, Keresan, Uto-Aztecan (Hopi), and Athabaskan (Navajo, from the Apachean subfamily). Zuni is a language isolate. Navajo is only a marginal member of the Sprachbund and does not share all its linguistic features. This is because the ancestors of the Navajo originate from the Athabaskan region (located in modern-day Canada and Alaska), and as a result they were relatively late in arriving to the Southwest compared to their Puebloan neighbors. Languages in the Tanoan and Apachean families, and additionally Hopi, can be compared to relatives not affected by this particular region's areal features as a reference for changes due to contact.

Tanoan consists of Taos, Picurís, Tewa, and Jemez. Keresan consists of Eastern Keres and Western Keres.

== Shared linguistic traits and areal features ==
The following are the shared linguistic traits of the Pueblo Sprachbund:

- tones, absent only in Zuni
- SOV word order (though inherited from proto-languages in the case of Navajo (Proto-Athabaskan) and Hopi (Proto(-Northern)-Uto-Aztecan))
- ejective consonants
- aspirated consonants
- /i, e, a, o, u/ vowel systems
- final devoicing of vowels & sonorants
- dual number
- ceremonial vocabulary
- labialized velar stops /kʷ, kʷʼ/

Most languages have ejectives. Zuni may have developed ejectives due to contact with Tanoan and Keresan which both have complete series of ejectives: Zuni has /tsʼ, tʃʼ, kʼ, kʷʼ/ but lacks the ejectives /pʼ, tʼ/ found in the other languages. Taos and Picurís (both Tanoan) have /pʼ, tʼ, tʃʼ, kʼ, kʷʼ/; Tewa (Tanoan) has /pʼ, tʼ, tsʼ, kʼ, kʷʼ/; Jemez (Tanoan) has /pʼ, tʼ, kʼ/; Keresan has /pʼ, tʼ, tsʼ, tʂʼ, tʃʼ, kʼ, sʼ, ʂʼ, ʃʼ/ (as well as glottalized sonorants /mʼ, nʼ, rʼ, wʼ, jʼ/). Hopi lacks ejectives completely. Navajo has /tʼ, tsʼ, tɬʼ, tʃʼ, kʼ, kʷʼ/.

Navajo may have acquired the stop /kʷ/ from Puebloan contact. Sherzer suggests that contact led to Acoma Keres sharing glottalized sonorants and glides with Navajo.

Zuni may have obtained its partial glottalized set and aspirants via contact with Tanoan and Keresan, which both have fully integrated series of glottals.

Other shared traits include Santa Clara acquiring retroflex sounds from Keresan and the Navajo acquiring /hʷ/ from Tanoan contact. Keresan may be the common source of glottalized nasals and semivowels in Navajo, and the development of /r/ in dialects of Tewa and Tiwa and possibly Hopi.

Linguist Paul Kroskrity argues for diffused Apachean traits in Tewa, such as the passive marked by prefixes that are structured differently from those of other Tanoan languages. In these languages the verb is made intransitive by allowing an agent argument in the verb structure. This also includes patient subjects and cases where the subject must be animate, including raising animate objects to the place of inanimate subjects. Further, Navajo and Tewa are the only languages in this group to have a "recognizable anaphor as a relativizer" when forming relative clauses. Kroskrity also finds similarity in the Tewa possessive suffix -bí, which parallels the third person possessive prefix bi- found in Apachean languages. This can be seen in the following example provided by Kroskrity:

Diffused bi Morpheme
Arizona Tewa	Navajo
sen-bí kʰaw man-POSS song '(a) man's song'	bisóódi bi-tsi pig POSS-flesh 'the pig's flesh'

This paralleling morpheme is also used in these languages' postpositional constructions. The reason for this diffusion has been attributed to trade networks and Apachean settlements near Pueblos in winter months.

== Vowels ==
Sherzer suggests that the 2-2-1 vowel system found in Tanoan languages (i u - e o - a) may be a result of contact with Zuni and Keresan language families. Sherzer states, "A 2-2-1 vowel system is a Pueblo-centered regional areal trait. Its development in some Tanoan languages may be due to contact with Zuni and Keresan."

== See also ==
- Linguistic areas of the Americas
- Puebloans

== Bibliography ==
- Campbell, Lyle (1997). American Indian languages: The historical linguistics of Native America. New York: Oxford University Press.
- Hale, Kenneth L. (1967). Toward a reconstruction of Kiowa–Tanoan phonology. International Journal of American Linguistics, 33 (2), 112-120.
- Hoijer, Harry (1945). Navaho phonology. University of New Mexico publications in anthropology, (No. 1).
- Kroskrity, Paul V. (1985). Areal-historical influences on Tewa possession, IJAL 51, 486-489.
- Kroskrity, Paul V. (1982). Language contact and linguistic diffusion: the Arizona Tewa speech community, in Bilingualism and language contact: Spanish, English, and Native American languages, 51-72.
- Kroskrity, Paul V. (1993). Language, history, and identity; ethnolinguistic studies of the Arizona Tewa. Tucson: University of Arizona Press.
- Mithun, Marianne (1999). The languages of Native North America. Cambridge: Cambridge University Press.
- Newman, Stanley (1965). Zuni grammar. University of New Mexico publications in anthropology (No. 14). Albuquerque: University of New Mexico.
- Newman, Stanley (1967). Zuni grammar: Alternative solutions versus weaknesses. International Journal of American Linguistics, 33, 187-192.
- Sherzer, Joel (1976). An Areal-Typological Study of American Indian Languages North of Mexico. Amsterdam: North-Holland Publishing Company.
- Trager, Felicia (1971). The phonology of Picuris. International Journal of American Linguistics, 37, 29-33.
- Trager, George L. (1942). The historical phonology of the Tiwa languages. Studies in Linguistics, 1 (5), 1-10.
- Trager, George L. (1946). An outline of Taos grammar. In C. Osgood (Ed.), Linguistic structures in North America (pp. 184–221). New York: Wenner-Green Foundation for Anthropological Research.
