= Sprachbund =

Languages similar by contact, not origin

A sprachbund (/ˈsprɑːkbʊnd/ SPRAHK-buund, from German: Sprachbund [ˈʃpʁaːxbʊnt], lit. 'language union'; pl. sprachbünde or sprachbunds), also known as a linguistic area, area of linguistic convergence, or diffusion area, is a group of languages that share areal features resulting from geographical proximity and language contact. The languages may be genetically unrelated, or only distantly related, but the sprachbund characteristics might give a false appearance of relatedness.

A grouping of languages that share features can only be defined as a sprachbund if the features are shared for some reason other than the genetic history of the languages. Without knowledge of the history of a regional group of similar languages, it may be difficult to determine whether sharing indicates a language family or a sprachbund.

== History ==
In a 1904 paper, Jan Baudouin de Courtenay emphasised the need to distinguish between language similarities arising from a genetic relationship (rodstvo) and those arising from convergence due to language contact (srodstvo).

Nikolai Trubetzkoy introduced the Russian term языковой союз (yazykovoy soyuz 'language union') in a 1923 article. In a paper presented to the first International Congress of Linguists in 1928, he used a German calque of this term, Sprachbund, defining it as a group of languages with similarities in syntax, morphological structure, cultural vocabulary and sound systems, but without systematic sound correspondences, shared basic morphology or shared basic vocabulary.

Later workers, starting with Trubetzkoy's colleague Roman Jakobson, have relaxed the requirement of similarities in all four of the areas stipulated by Trubetzkoy.

A rigorous set of principles for what evidence is valid for establishing a linguistic area has been presented by Campbell, Kaufman, and Smith-Stark.

== Examples ==
=== The Balkans ===
The idea of areal convergence is commonly attributed to Jernej Kopitar's description in 1830 of Albanian, Bulgarian and Romanian as giving the impression of "nur eine Sprachform ... mit dreierlei Sprachmaterie" (lit. 'only one language form with three kinds of language material'), which has been rendered by Victor Friedman as "one grammar with the [sic] three lexicons".

The Balkan sprachbund comprises Albanian, Romanian, the South Slavic languages of the southern Balkans (Bulgarian, Macedonian and to a lesser degree Serbo-Croatian), Greek, Balkan Turkish, and Romani.

All but one of these are Indo-European languages but from very divergent branches, and Turkish is a Turkic language. Yet they have exhibited several signs of grammatical convergence, such as avoidance of the infinitive, future tense formation, and others.

The same features are not found in other languages that are otherwise closely related, such as the other Romance languages in relation to Romanian, and the other Slavic languages such as Polish in relation to Bulgaro-Macedonian.

=== Mainland Southeast Asia ===
Languages of the Mainland Southeast Asia linguistic area have such great surface similarity that early linguists tended to group them all into a single family, although the modern consensus places them into numerous unrelated families. The area stretches from Thailand to China and is home to speakers of languages of the Sino-Tibetan, Hmong–Mien (or Miao–Yao), Tai–Kadai, Austronesian (represented by Chamic) and Mon–Khmer families.

Neighbouring languages across these families, though presumed unrelated, often have similar features, which are believed to have spread by diffusion. A well-known example is the similar tone systems in Sinitic languages (Sino-Tibetan), Hmong–Mien, Tai languages (Kadai) and Vietnamese (Austroasiatic). Most of these languages passed through an earlier stage with three tones on most syllables (but no tonal distinctions on checked syllables ending in a stop consonant), which was followed by a tone split where the distinction between voiced and voiceless consonants disappeared but in compensation the number of tones doubled. These parallels led to confusion over the classification of these languages, until André-Georges Haudricourt showed in 1954 that tone was not an invariant feature, by demonstrating that Vietnamese tones corresponded to certain final consonants in other languages of the Mon–Khmer family, and proposed that tone in the other languages had a similar origin.

Similarly, the unrelated Khmer (Mon–Khmer), Cham (Austronesian) and Lao (Kadai) languages have almost identical vowel systems. Many languages in the region are of the isolating (or analytic) type, with mostly monosyllabic morphemes and little use of inflection or affixes, though a number of Mon–Khmer languages have derivational morphology. Shared syntactic features include classifiers, object–verb order and topic–comment structure, though in each case there are exceptions in branches of one or more families.

=== Indian subcontinent ===
In a classic 1956 paper titled "India as a Linguistic Area", Murray Emeneau laid the groundwork for the general acceptance of the concept of a sprachbund. In the paper, Emeneau observed that the subcontinent's Dravidian and Indo-Aryan languages shared a number of features that were not inherited from a common source, but were areal features, the result of diffusion during sustained contact. These include retroflex consonants, echo words, subject–object–verb word order, discourse markers, and the quotative.

Emeneau specified the tools to establish that language and culture had fused for centuries on Indian soil to produce an integrated mosaic of structural convergence of four distinct language families: Indo-Aryan, Dravidian, Munda and Sino-Tibetan. This concept provided scholarly substance for explaining the underlying Indian-ness of apparently divergent cultural and linguistic patterns. With his further contributions, this area has now become a major field of research in language contact and convergence.

=== Northeast Asia ===
Some linguists, such as Matthias Castrén, G. J. Ramstedt, Nicholas Poppe and Pentti Aalto, supported the idea that the Mongolic, Turkic, and Tungusic families of Asia (and some small parts of Europe) have a common ancestry, in a controversial group they call Altaic. Koreanic, Japonic and Ainu languages, which are also hypothetically related according to some scholars like William George Aston, Shōsaburō Kanazawa, Samuel Martin and Sergei Starostin, are sometimes included as part of the purported Altaic family. This latter hypothesis was supported by people including Roy Andrew Miller, John C. Street and Karl Heinrich Menges. Gerard Clauson, Gerhard Doerfer, Juha Janhunen, Stefan Georg and others dispute or reject this. The latter hypothesis was renamed by Martine Robbeets as Transeurasian languages. A common alternative explanation for similarities among the "Altaic" languages, such as vowel harmony and agglutination, is that they are due to areal diffusion.

The Qinghai–Gansu sprachbund, in the northeastern part of the Tibetan Plateau spanning the Chinese provinces of Qinghai and Gansu, is an area of interaction between varieties of northwest Mandarin Chinese, Amdo Tibetan and Mongolic and Turkic languages.

=== Europe ===
Standard Average European (SAE) is a concept introduced in 1939 by Benjamin Whorf to group the modern Indo-European languages of Europe which shared common features. Whorf argued that these languages were characterized by a number of similarities including syntax and grammar, vocabulary and its use as well as the relationship between contrasting words and their origins, idioms and word order which all made them stand out from many other language groups around the world which do not share these similarities, in essence creating a continental sprachbund. His point was to argue that the disproportionate degree of knowledge of SAE languages biased linguists towards considering grammatical forms to be highly natural or even universal, when in fact they were only peculiar to the SAE language group.

Whorf likely considered Romance and West Germanic to form the core of the SAE, i.e. the literary languages of Europe which have seen substantial cultural influence from Latin during the medieval period. The North Germanic and Balto-Slavic languages tend to be more peripheral members.

Alexander Gode, who was instrumental in the development of Interlingua, characterized it as "Standard Average European". The Romance, Germanic, and Slavic control languages of Interlingua are reflective of the language groups most often included in the SAE Sprachbund.

The Standard Average European Sprachbund is most likely the result of ongoing language contact in the time of the Migration Period and later, continuing during the Middle Ages and the Renaissance. Inheritance of the SAE features from Proto-Indo-European can be ruled out because Proto-Indo-European, as currently reconstructed, lacked most of the SAE features.

=== Others ===
- Sumerian and Akkadian in the 3rd millennium BC
- Persian and Arabic in West Asia
- Ethiopian language area, which includes the Ethio-Semitic, Omotic and most Cushitic languages
- Bantu Shimaore and Malayo-Polynesian Bushi on the Comorian island of Mayotte
- in the Sepik River basin of New Guinea
- in the Baltics (northeast Europe)
- in the Caucasus, though this is disputed
- the Iranic Gilaki and Mazandarani languages with South Caucasian languages
- several linguistic areas of the Americas, including:
  - Mesoamerican linguistic area
  - Pueblo linguistic area
  - Northwest Coast linguistic area
- Austronesian and Papuan languages spoken in eastern Indonesia and East Timor
- East Anatolia—proposed, though currently uncertain
- Modern Himalayas region

== Proposed examples ==
Language families that have been proposed to actually be sprachbunds

- Pama–Nyungan languages of Australia
- Afro-Asiatic languages, proposed by G. W. Tsereteli to be a sprachbund rather than a language family. However, the linguistic consensus is that Afro-Asiatic is a valid language family.

== See also ==
- Isogloss
- Koiné language
- Geolinguistics
