= Washoe people =

Indigenous people of the Great Basin, U.S.

Washoe
wá·šiw
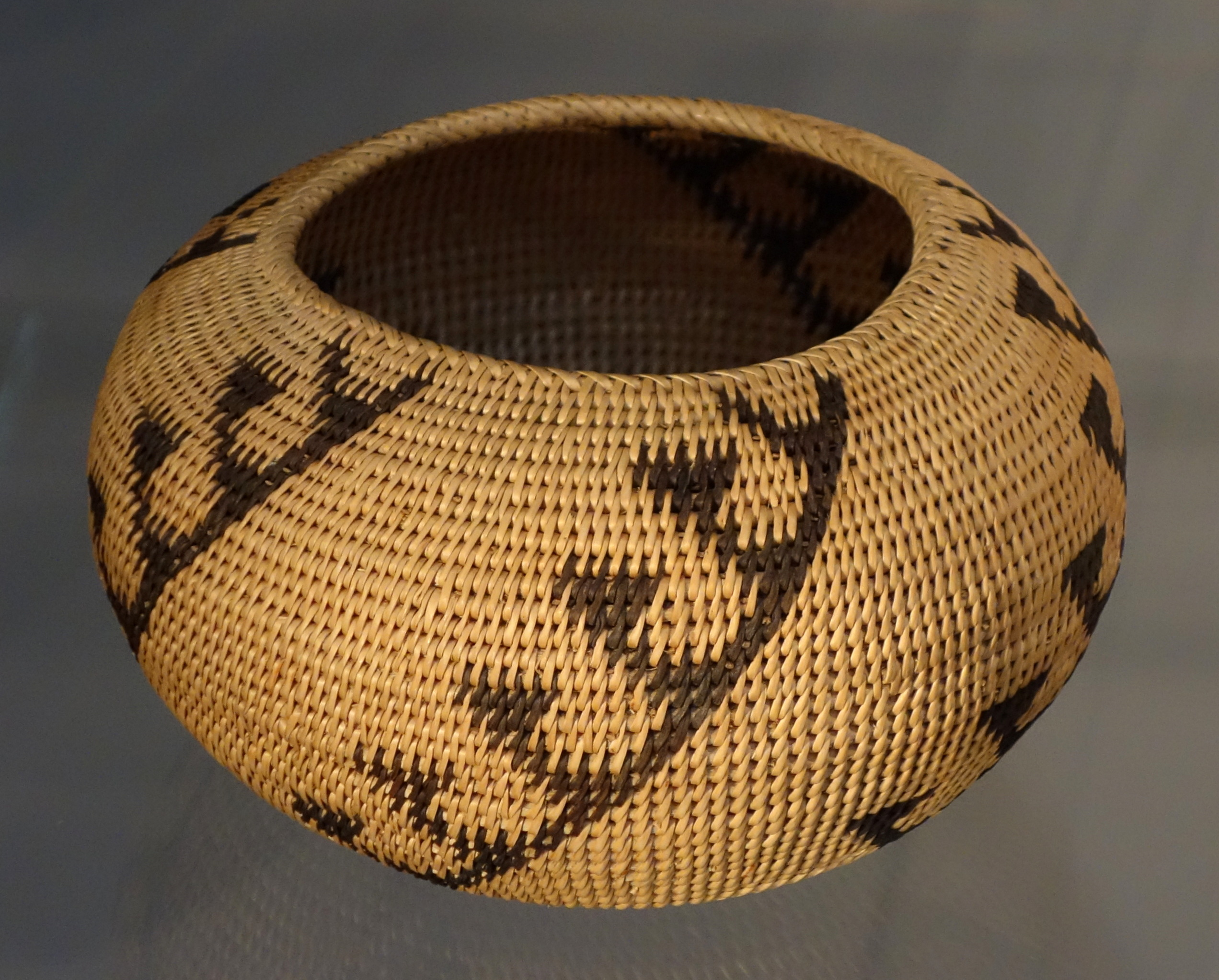
- Coiled Washoe basket, ca. 1890–1910, willow, bracken fern, California at the Chazen Museum of Art

Total population
- 1,500 (2007)

Regions with significant populations
- United States (California and Nevada)

Languages
- English, Washo

- Person: wá·šiw
- People: waší·šiw
- Language: wá·šiw ʔítlu
- Country: waší·šiw Ɂítdeh

The Washoe or waší·šiw are a Great Basin tribe of Native Americans, living near Lake Tahoe at the border between California and Nevada. Many Washoe people today are enrolled in the Washoe Tribe of Nevada & California, though some are enrolled in the Reno-Sparks Indian Colony and the Susanville Indian Rancheria. The Washoe language is a linguistic isolate.

== Name ==
The name "Washoe" or "Washo" is derived from the autonym Waashiw (wa·šiw or wá·šiw) in the Washo language or from wašišiw (waší·šiw), the plural form of wašiw. It means "people from here". Washoe was also written in older literature as Wa She Shu.

== Territory ==
Washoe people have lived in the Great Basin and the eastern Sierra Nevada mountains for at least the last 6,000 years, some say up to 9,000 years or more. Prior to contact with Europeans, the territory of the Washoe people centered around Lake Tahoe (/ˈtɑːhoʊ/; Washo: dáʔaw / daʔaw / Da ow – "the lake"; or dewʔá·gaʔa – "edge of the lake") and was roughly bounded by the southern shore of Honey Lake in the north, the West Walker River, Topaz Lake, and Sonora Pass in the south, the Sierra Nevada crest in the west, and the Pine Nut Mountains and Virginia Range in the east. Beside Lake Tahoe the Washoe utilized the upper ranges of the Carson (dá·bal k'iláʔam), Truckee (dabayóduweʔ), and West Walker rivers to the east as well the Sierra Valley (a site of extensive freshwater marshes filled with cattails, bulrushes and alkaline flats that drain into the Middle Fork Feather River) to the north. The Washoe would generally spend the summer in the Sierra Nevada, especially at Lake Tahoe; the fall in the ranges to the east; and the winter and spring in the valleys between them. Washoe Lake (ćóʔyaʔ dáʔaw) was named after them.

The Washoe/Washo were loosely organized into three (in some sources four) regional groups speaking slightly different dialects, which in turn were divided in groups (cooperating extending families for the seasonal hunt and living together in winter camps) and in nuclear families. The regional group was determined by where people had a winter camp:

- Welmelti ("Northerners" or "Northern Washoe People")
- Pauwalu / Powalu ("Easterners" or "Central Washoe People")
- Hungalelti ("Southerners" or "Southern Washoe People") and,
- Tanalelti ("Westerners" or "Western Washoe People")

Since the western part of the Washo territory was in the mountains and subject to heavy snows, few people wintered there so very few were organized into the western group.

== History ==
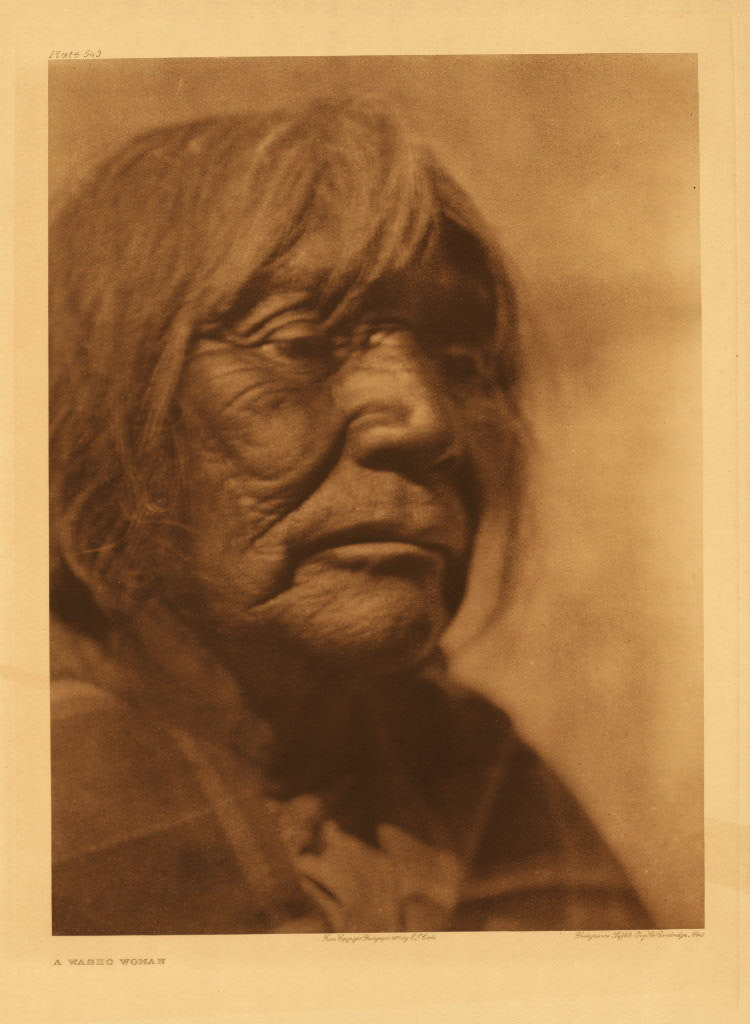
Washoe woman

Washoe people are the only Great Basin tribe whose language is not Numic, so they are believed to have inhabited the region prior to neighboring tribes. The Kings Beach Complex that emerged about 500 CE around Lake Tahoe and the northern Sierra Nevada are regarded as early Washoe culture. The Martis complex may have overlapped with the Kings Beach culture, and Martis pit houses gave way to conical bark slab houses of historic Washoe culture.

Washoe people may have made contact with Spanish explorers in the early 19th century, but the Washoe did not sustain contact with people of European culture until the 1848 California Gold Rush. Washoe resistance to incursions on their lands proved futile. The last armed conflict with the Washoes and non-Indians was the Potato War of 1857, when hungry Washoes were killed or wounded for taking three acres of potatoes from European-American William Morehead's potato field at his farm near Honey Lake, some two miles northwest of Milford, California.

"No serious difficulty occurred until 1857, when the Indians, moved largely by a lack of food, became so troublesome by their thieving habits that difficulties arose between them and the settlers. The valley was then in its second year of permanent settlement. The troubles of this season are generally referred to as the Potato War, owing to the cause of the difficulties. The troublesome savages were of the Pit River tribe, and a company of the settlers, under Captain William Weatherlow, and accompanied by Winnemucca and a band of his Pah-Ute braves, went out against the savages, and punished them severely. The Plumas Rangers from Plumas County came over to the aid of the settlers, but arrived too late to participate in active hostilities. The Pit River Indians still annoyed the settlers during the next two years, and only ceased after their severe chastisement by General Crook." -Illustrated history of Plumas, Lassen & Sierra counties

Loss of the valley hunting grounds to farms and the piñon pine groves to feed Virginia City's demand for lumber and charcoal drove most Washoe to dependency on jobs on white ranches and farms and in cities. The areas where they settled became known as Indian colonies.

== Culture ==
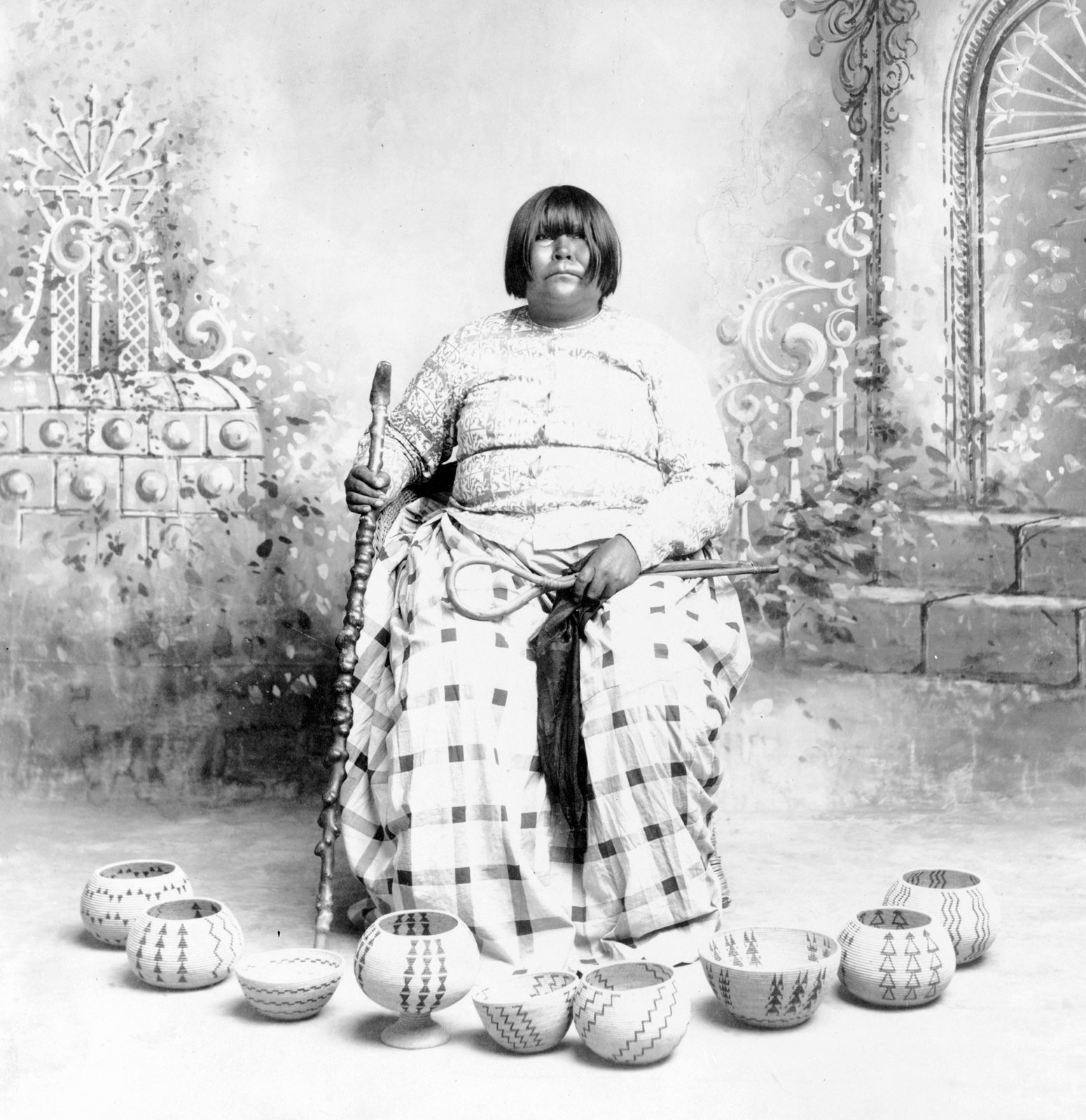
Louisa Keyser (Dat So La Lee), Washoe basketweaver

Piñon pine nuts gathered in the fall provided much of the food eaten in the winter. Roots, seeds, berries and game provided much of the food eaten during the rest of the year. The Washoe people were also deeply knowledgeable about their land and where resources were plentiful. This included an understanding of the seasonal cycles of both plants and animals. Wašiw people were also dependent on fishing at Lake Tahoe and the surrounding streams. Fishing was a huge part of Wašiw life; and each family had its own fishing grounds, until contact with Western civilization led to commercial fishing in the area, destroying another important resource for the Wašiw.

The Pine Nut Dance and girls' puberty rites remain very important ceremonies. The Wašiw people once relied on medicine men and their knowledge of medicinal plants and ceremonies. Much of this knowledge and activity has been lost due to contact with the Western world.

Washoe culture was based mostly on the legends that carried the explanation of different areas of life. The legends were handed over from one generation to another by storytelling and were told to younger generations to teach them basic things about Washoe's way of living. Children could get to know about gathering techniques, medicine preparation, and the legends were meant to teach them how to appreciate the land they were living in and give them a better understanding of Washoe's lifestyle. Children were raised in the environment which recognized family as the most valued thing. The whole Washoe life was concentrated on cooperation and unity, and older tribe members needed to convey their knowledge to the younger so the tribe culture would survive. Everyone in the family had his own role in everyday activities like fishing, gathering or hunting which helped Washoe people with doing everyday life tasks more efficiently.

=== Historical life cycle ===
The area of residence of Washoe people let them obtain food from three different ways: fishing, gathering, and hunting. Since each way required having special skills and knowledge people were usually trained in one field to reduce the possibility of failing the tasks they were responsible for. Therefore, the Washoe tribe's life was dependent on the actual environment possibilities. Also, scarcity of sources would not let the tribe perform every way at once, therefore the Washoe lifestyle was divided into three periods: "the fishing year", "the gathering year" and "the hunting year".

- "Fishing year" – which came after the period of starvation, started in early spring as the snow in the mountains started to melt. At that time, some tribe members (mainly young men, boys, and sometimes unmarried women) left the winter camps and moved toward the Lake Tahoe to start the fishing season. By doing this they could save the leftovers from food reserves for people that had stayed in winter camps. They used caves and natural shelters as protection from the cold along with loin clothes and blankets made from rabbit skin to keep themselves warm. They fished for whitefish which some of them they consumed and some they carried back to winter camps so their folks could eat and gather strength for the return trip to the lake, which happened when it got warmer. It was the family's decision when to leave the winter camps and go to Lake Tahoe and it depended on the condition and age of family members (family with infants or older people tend to leave the camps later than fitter members of the tribe. The whole Washoe tribe should have been returned to the Lake Tahoe shores by the beginning of June. Almost every tribe member was involved in fishing when the season came. The Washoe used the lake resources to the fullest and caught as many fish they could. They had learned how to preserve the fish drying it on the sun and made the food reserves for the future.
- "Gathering year" – could have been performed all year, but different ways of acquiring were used and the different type and amounts of food were provided. During winter the Washoe ate mostly the food they had gathered before the winter season started because very little vegetables could be found. As the spring came, more and more food became available. However, the food was limited over the place it was found and it could only feed a certain number of people, so tribe split up in smaller groups and went to look for food in different ways. The gathering was usually performed by women while men practiced fishing at the lake or hunting.
- "Hunting year" – started when the first animals appeared at the beginning of the spring. It was only men's activity, so boys were trained from the youngest age. The Washoe tribe hunt for bigger animals like deer, bears or antelope as well as smaller ones: rabbits, birds, squirrels. The different techniques and times of hunting were adjusted for different types of animals.

Fall was the richest in food season of the year as all ways of obtaining the food could have been performed. The winter period was the time of starvation as the stocks of food run out quickly and almost no food could have been obtained over the coldest months of the year. However, Washoe people learned how to survive the hardest time of the year by learning how to use the resources the land had given them. They knew they needed to keep the balance as each way of obtaining food was equally crucial for these people to survive.

Anthropologist Ernestine Friedl has noted that men and women's cooperation in gathering food lead to "no individual distributions of food and relatively little difference in male and female rights," contributing to gender equality amongst the pre-colonial Washoe.

== Language ==
The Washoe / Wašiw language or wá·šiw ʔítlu (today: wašiw wagayay) has been regarded as a language isolate, However, it is sometimes tentatively regarded as part of the controversial Hokan language family. The language is written in the Latin script.

The Wašiw language is now considered an endangered language as only a handful of fluent elder speakers use the language. There has been a recent revival of the language and culture within the Tribe. "wašiw wagayay maŋal" (the "house where Wašiw is spoken") was the first attempt by the Wašiw people to renew their language for the future generations. The tribe currently relies on the tribal Cultural Resource Department to provide language classes to the community. However, there has recently been a pedagogical shift within the tribe, and the youth have become the focal point of language and culture programs.

== Washoe Tribe and Lake Tahoe ==
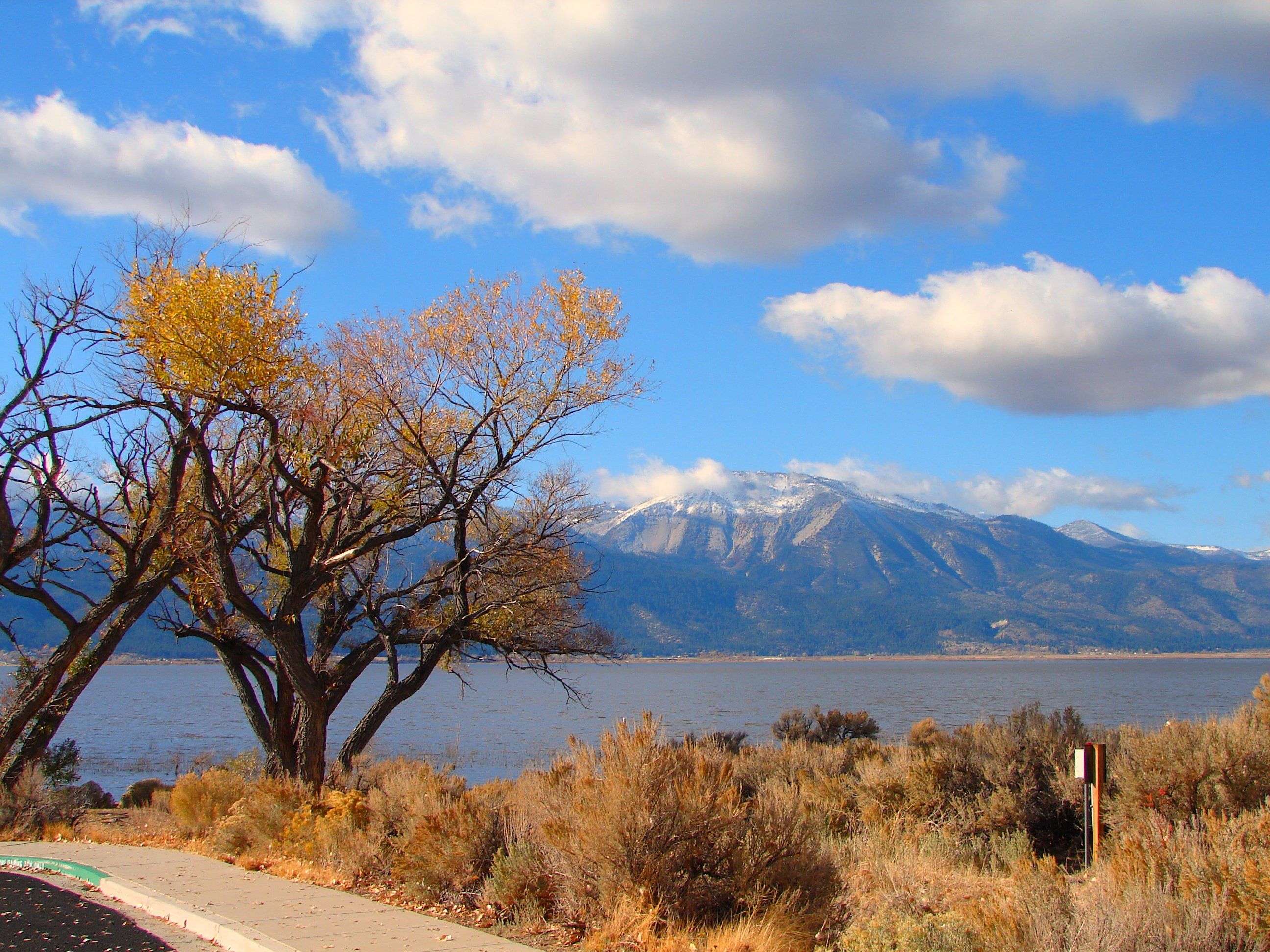
Lake Washoe, Nevada

The Washoe people are considered to be the Indigenous inhabitants of Lake Tahoe area, occupying the lake and surrounding lands for thousands of years. As the Native residents, they believe that they have the best knowledge of how the land should be maintained, and consider themselves to be the proper caretakers of the Lake Tahoe area, which has been a center Washoe tribes yearly cultural gatherings, where most traditional events took place. In 2002, The Committee on Energy and Natural Resources officially granted custody to the Washoe Tribe of Nevada and California over the land around the Lake Tahoe area for cultural purposes.

== Washoe tribes ==
- Reno-Sparks Indian Colony
- Susanville Indian Rancheria
- Washoe Tribe of Nevada and California

Under the Indian Reorganization Act of 1934, the colonies in the Carson Valley area of Nevada and California gained federal recognition as the Washoe Tribe of Nevada and California. The colony in Reno, Nevada, which also has a substantial Paiute, Washoe and Shoshoni population, gained separate recognition as the Reno–Sparks Indian Colony. There is evidence that some Washoe settled in the southwest region of Montana. The Susanville Rancheria includes Washoe members, as well as Northern Paiute, Northeastern Maidu, Achomawi, and Atsugewi members.
