= Te-Moak Tribe of Western Shoshone Indians of Nevada =

Total population
- 2,096

Regions with significant populations
- United States (Nevada)

Languages
- English, Shoshoni

Religion
- traditional tribal religion

Related ethnic groups
- other Western Shoshone tribes

The Te-Moak Tribe of Western Shoshone Indians of Nevada is a federally recognized tribe of Western Shoshone people in northeastern Nevada.

== History ==
The tribe organized under the 1934 Indian Reorganization Act. Western Shoshone elected a traditional council, led by Chief Muchach Temoak and his descendants, to create the new governments; however, the United States refused to recognize the traditional council and created the Te-Moaks Bands Council. Traditionalists did not feel adequately represented by this council and created the United Western Shoshone Legal Defense and Education Association, now known as the Sacred Lands Association in 1974. The traditionalists argued before the Indian Claims Commission (ICC) that the Te-Moak Bands Council did not speak for them and the tribe never gave up their title to their traditional lands. Their claims and appeal were rejected in 1979, when the ICC ruled that the Western Shoshone lost title to their lands in the Treaty of Ruby Valley in 1863. In 1980 the courts ruled that the lands were not ceded in 1863 but were lost on 6 December 1979. Despite appeals by the tribe, the US Supreme Court rules in 1985 that $26 million was paid to the tribe in 1979 for 24 million acres (97,000 km^{2}) of land. The tribe is still fighting to reclaim their traditional lands today.

The tribe's corporate charter was approved in 1938 and their current constitution was amended in 1982.

== Today ==
The Te-Moak Tribe Council is headquartered in Elko, Nevada. The tribe is composed of four constituent bands. Their constitution allows for an unlimited number of reservations and Indian colonies to join the tribe.

=== Battle Mountain Band ===
Location of the Battle Mountain Reservation

This band governs the Battle Mountain reservation, at 40°39′51″N 116°58′11″W, in Battle Mountain, Nevada. Traditionally, they are the Tonomudza/Tonammutsa (Donammuzi) band of Western Shoshone. Their separate parcels of land total 683.3 acres (2.765 km^{2}). Current reservation population is 165 and total tribal enrollment is 516. Their current band council includes:

- Lydia Johnson, Chairman
- Florine Maine, Vice Chair
- Delbert Holley
- Joseph Holley
- Emerson Winap
- Vacant Seat

=== Elko Band ===
Location of the Elko Indian Colony

The Elko Indian Colony, at 40°51′02″N 115°45′55″W, was established in 1918. They govern 192.8 acres (0.780 km^{2}) of federal trust lands. Tribal enrollment is 1,143. Only 6% of the band graduated from high school and their average per capita annual income is $7,000. They are headquartered in Elko, Nevada and their current band council is as follows:

- David Decker, Chairman
- Davis Gonzales, Vice Chairman
- Gerald Temoke
- Nick Knight
- Vernon Thompson
- Leta Jim
- Vacant.

=== South Fork Band ===
Location of the South Fork and Odgers Ranch Indian Reservation

The South Fork and Odgers Ranch Indian Reservation, at 40°34′22″N 115°36′08″W, was established in Lee, Nevada in 1941 The Band governs 19,049 acres (77.09 km^{2}) of land. 59 members live on the reservation and their total band enrollment is 176. Their current band council is as follows:

- Tyler Reynolds, Chairman
- Alice Tybo, Vice Chairman
- Brandon Reynolds
- Dallas Smales
- Gilbert Temoke
- Vacant

=== Wells Band ===
Location of the Wells Indian Colony

The Wells Indian Colony, at 41°07′01″N 114°58′44″W, was established in 1980 and is 80 acres (320,000 m^{2}) large. Traditionally, they are the Kuiyudika band of Western Shoshone, after a desert plant used for food; within this group were at least two other smaller groups, the Doyogadzu Newenee (end-of-the-mountain people) and the Waiha-Muta Newenee (fire-burning-on ridge people). Clover Valley served as a rendezvous spot among these small Newe bands. Their headquarters is in Wells, Nevada. 39 members live on the reservation, and total band enrollment is 177. Their current band council is as follows:

- Casey Franco, Chairman
- Steve Brady, Vice-Chairman
- Harvey Healy
- Steve Johnny

== Notable Te-Moak Shoshone ==
- Ned Blackhawk, a Te-Moak historian and professor at Yale University
