= Zuni language =

Language indigenous to New Mexico

Zuni
- Shiwiʼma
- Pronunciation: [ˈʃiwiʔma]
- Native to: U.S.
- Region: Western New Mexico
- Ethnicity: Zuni
- Native speakers: 9,620 (2015)
- Language family: Language isolate

Language codes
- ISO 639-2: zun
- ISO 639-3: zun
- Glottolog: zuni1245
- ELP: Zuni
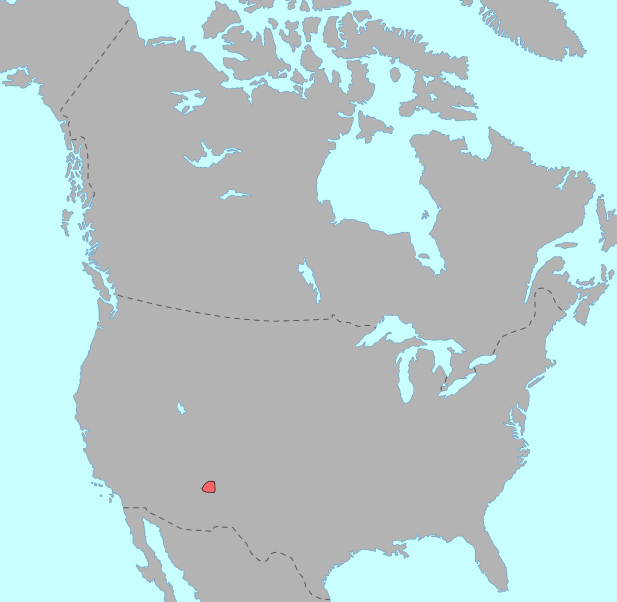
- Pre-European contact distribution of Zuni

Zuni (/ˈzuːni/ ZOO-nee; endonym: Shiwiʼma) is a language of the Zuni people, indigenous to western New Mexico and eastern Arizona in the southwestern United States. It is spoken by around 9,500 people, especially in the vicinity of Zuni Pueblo, New Mexico, and, much less commonly, in parts of Arizona.

The Zuni name for their own language, Shiwiʼma (shiwi "Zuni" + -ʼma "vernacular"; IPA: [ˈʃiwiʔma]) can be translated as "Zuni way", whereas its speakers are collectively known as ʼA꞉shiwi (ʼa꞉(w)- "plural" + shiwi "Zuni"; IPA: [ʔaːʃiwi]).

Edmund Ladd reported in 1994 that Zuni was still the main language of communication in the pueblo and is used in the home (Newman 1996). However, in 2018, the Pueblo of Zuni Head Start Program reported that most parents were unable to speak Zuni fluently and mostly spoke English, and that only 16 percent of the Zuni children spoke Zuni.

== Classification ==
Zuni is considered a language isolate. The Zuni have, however, borrowed a number of words from Keres, Hopi, and O’odham pertaining to religion and religious observances.

A number of possible relationships of Zuni to other languages have been proposed by various researchers, although none of these have gained general acceptance. The main hypothetical proposals have been connections with Penutian (and Penutioid and Macro-Penutian), Tanoan, Hokan phyla, and the Keresan languages.

The most clearly articulated hypothesis is Newman's (1964) connection to Penutian, but even this was considered by Newman (according to Michael Silverstein) to be a tongue-in-cheek work due to the inherently problematic nature of the methodology used in Penutian studies (Goddard 1996). Newman's cognate sets suffered from common problems in comparative linguistics, such as comparing commonly borrowed forms (e.g., words for "tobacco"), forms with large semantic differences (e.g., "bad" and "garbage", "horse" and "hoof"), nursery forms, and onomatopoetic forms (Campbell 1997). Zuni was also included under Morris Swadesh's Penutioid proposal and Joseph Greenberg's very inclusive Penutian sub-grouping – both without convincing arguments (Campbell 1997).

Zuni was included in the Aztec-Tanoan language family in Edward Sapir's heuristic 1929 classification (without supporting evidence). Later discussions of the Aztec-Tanoan hypothesis usually excluded Zuni (Foster 1996).

Karl-Heinz Gursky published problematic unconvincing evidence for a Keresan-Zuni grouping. J. P. Harrington wrote one unpublished paper with the title "Zuñi Discovered to be Hokan" (Campbell 1997).

== Language contact ==
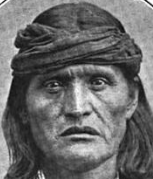
Zuni man

As Zuni is a language in the Pueblo linguistic area, it shares a number of features with Hopi, Keresan, and Tanoan (and to a lesser extent Navajo) that are probably due to language contact. The development of ejective consonants in Zuni may be due to contact with Keresan and Tanoan languages which have complete series of ejectives. Likewise, aspirated consonants may have diffused into Zuni. Other shared traits include: final devoicing of vowels and sonorant consonants, dual number, ceremonial vocabulary, and the presence of a labialized velar [kʷ] (Campbell 1997).

== Phonology ==
The 16 consonants of Zuni (with IPA phonetic symbol when different from the orthography) are the following:

	Bilabial	Dental/Alveolar		Post- alveolar	Palatal	Velar		Glottal
	Bilabial	median	lateral	Post- alveolar	Palatal	plain	labial	Glottal
Nasal	m	n						
Plosive	p	t				k ⟨k, ky⟩	kʷ ⟨kw⟩	ʔ ⟨ʼ⟩
Affricate		ts		tʃ ⟨ch⟩				
Fricative		s	ɬ ⟨ł⟩	ʃ ⟨sh⟩				h
Approximant			l		j ⟨y⟩		w	

The vowels are the following:

	Front	back
High	i	u
Mid	e	o
Low	a	

Zuni syllables have the following specification:

C(C)V(ː)(C)(C)

== Morphology ==
Word order in Zuni is fairly free with a tendency toward SOV. There is no case-marking on nouns. Verbs are complex, compared to nouns, with loose incorporation. Like other languages in the Southwest, Zuni employs switch-reference.

Newman (1965, 1996) classifies Zuni words according to their structural morphological properties (namely the presence and type of inflectional suffixes), not according to their associated syntactic frames. His terms noun and substantive are therefore not synonymous.

=== Pronouns ===
Zuni uses overt pronouns for first and second persons. There are no third person pronouns. The pronouns distinguish three numbers (singular, dual, and plural) and three cases (subject, object, and possessive). In addition, some subject and possessive pronouns have different forms depending on whether they appear utterance-medially or utterance-finally (object pronouns do not occur utterance-medially). All pronoun forms are shown in the following table:

		Subject		Object	Possessive	
		Medial	Final	Object	Medial	Final
1st person	singular	hoʼ	ho꞉ʼo	hom	hom	homma
1st person	dual	hon	hoʼno	hoʼnaʼ	hoʼnaʼ	hoʼnaʼ
1st person	plural	hon	hoʼno	hoʼnaʼ	hoʼnʼa꞉wan	hoʼnʼa꞉wan
2nd person	singular	doʼ	do꞉ʼo	dom	dom	domma
2nd person	dual	don	doʼno	doʼnaʼ	doʼnaʼ	doʼnaʼ
2nd person	plural	don	doʼno	doʼnaʼ	doʼnʼa꞉wan	doʼnʼa꞉wan

There is syncretism between dual and plural non-possessive forms in the first and second persons. Utterances with these pronouns are typically disambiguated by the fact that plural pronouns agree with plural-marked verb forms.

== Sociolinguistics ==
- storytelling (Delapna꞉we) – Tedlock (1972)
- ceremonial speech – Newman (1955)
- slang – Newman (1955)

=== Names ===
Zuni adults are often known after the relationship between that adult and a child. For example, a person might be called "father of so-and-so", etc. The circumlocution is used to avoid using adult names, which have religious meanings and are very personal.

== Orthography ==
There are twenty letters in the Zuni alphabet.

Uppercase
A	B	CH	D	E	H	I	K	L	Ł	M	N	O	P	S	T	U	W	Y	’
Lowercase
a	b	ch	d	e	h	i	k	l	ł	m	n	o	p	s	t	u	w	y	’

- Double consonants indicate geminate (long) sounds. For instance, the ⟨nn⟩ in shiwayanne "car" represents /nː/.
- Long vowels are indicated with a colon ⟨꞉⟩ following the vowel, as is the [aː] in waʼma꞉we "animals".
- ⟨c⟩ is not part of the alphabet, although the digraph ⟨ch⟩ is. There are also other two-letter combination sounds (like ⟨sh⟩).
- ⟨c, r, g, v, z, x, q, f, j⟩ are not used to write Zuni, except for the occasional borrowed word.
- ⟨ł⟩ indicates IPA /ɬ/ (a voiceless alveolar lateral fricative, pronounced roughly like h and l together).
- ⟨ʼ⟩ indicates IPA /ʔ/ (a glottal stop) – it is written medially and finally but not word-initially.

This orthography was largely worked out by Curtis Cook.

=== Old orthographies ===
Linguists and anthropologists created and used their own writing systems for Zuni before the alphabet was standardized. The practical orthography developed by linguist Stanley Newman (Newman 1954) essentially followed Americanist phonetic notation with the substitution of some uncommon letters with other letters or digraphs. A further revised orthography is used in Dennis Tedlock's transcriptions of oral narratives.

See the table below for a comparison of the systems.

Tedlock	Newman	Americanist	Current orthography	IPA
ʼ	/	ʔ	ʼ	/ʔ/
ʼʼ	//	ʔʔ	ʼʼ	/ʔː/
a	a	a	a	/a/
aa	a꞉	aˑ	a꞉	/aː/
ch	ch	č	ch	/tʃ/
cch	chch	čč	chh	/tʃː/
e	e	e	e	/e/
ee	e꞉	eˑ	e꞉	/eː/
i	i	i	i	/i/
ii	i꞉	iˑ	i꞉	/iː/
h	j	h	h	/h/
hh	jj	hh	hh	/hː/
k	k	k	k	/k/
kk	kk	kk	kk	/kː/
kw	q	kʷ	kw	/kʷ/
kkw	qq	kʷkʷ	kkw	/kʷː/
l	l	l	l	/l/
ll	ll	ll	ll	/lː/
lh	lh	ł	ł	/ɬ/
llh	lhlh	łł	łł	/ɬː/
m	m	m	m	/m/

Tedlock	Newman	Americanist	Current orthography	IPA
mm	mm	mm	mm	/mː/
n	n	n	n	/n/
nn	nn	nn	nn	/nː/
o	o	o	o	/o/
oo	o꞉	oˑ	o꞉	/oː/
p	p	p	p	/p/
pp	pp	pp	pp	/pː/
s	s	s	s	/s/
ss	ss	ss	ss	/sː/
sh	sh	š	sh	/ʃ/
ssh	shsh	šš	shh	/ʃː/
t	t	t	t	/t/
tt	tt	tt	tt	/tː/
ts	z	c	ts	/ts/
tts	zz	cc	tts	/tsː/
u	u	u	u	/u/
uu	u꞉	uˑ	u꞉	/uː/
w	w	w	w	/w/
ww	ww	ww	ww	/wː/
y	y	y	y	/j/
yy	yy	yy	yy	/jː/

In Newman's orthography (used in his dictionary, Newman 1958), the symbols, ⟨ch, j, lh, q, sh, z, /, ꞉⟩ replaced Americanist ⟨č, h, ł, kʷ, š, c, ʔ, ˑ⟩ (used in Newman's grammar, Newman 1965).

Tedlock's orthography uses ⟨ʼ⟩ instead of Newman's ⟨/⟩ except at the beginning of words, where it is not written. Additionally, in Tedlock's system, long vowels are written doubled instead of with a length mark ⟨꞉⟩ as in Newman's system (e.g. ⟨aa⟩ instead of ⟨a꞉⟩) and ⟨h⟩ and ⟨kw⟩ are used instead of ⟨j⟩ and ⟨q⟩. Finally, Tedlock writes the following long consonants – ⟨cch, llh, ssh, tts⟩ – with a doubled initial letter instead of Newman's doubling of the digraphs – ⟨chch⟩, ⟨lhlh⟩, ⟨shsh⟩ – and ⟨kkw⟩ and ⟨tts⟩ are used instead of Newman's ⟨qq⟩ and ⟨zz⟩.
