= Reno-Sparks Indian Colony =

- Indian reservation
- Flag

- Location of the Reno-Sparks Indian Colony
- Country: United States
- State: Nevada
- Website: Reno-Sparks Indian Colony

The Reno-Sparks Indian Colony in Nevada was established in the early 1900s by members of related tribes who lived near Reno for work; they became a federally recognized tribe in 1934 after forming a government under the Indian Reorganization Act.

With its base in Reno, Nevada, the RSIC consists of 1,134 members from three Great Basin tribes: the Paiute, the Shoshone and the Washoe. The reservation lands have been limited, consisting of the original 28-acre Colony located in central-west Reno (39°41′31″N 119°44′44″W) and another 1,920 acres put into trust for the tribe in 1984 in Hungry Valley, which is 19 miles north of the Colony and west of Spanish Springs, Nevada, in Eagle Canyon.

In November 2016, the Barack Obama administration announced transfer of 13,400 acres of former Bureau of Land Management (BLM) land to the Reno-Sparks Indian Colony. This was achieved under the Nevada Native Nations Lands Act. It authorized the transfer of more than 71,000 acres of BLM and U.S. Forest Service lands into trust status for six Nevada tribes. This will provide the tribes with more sustainable bases for their peoples, as well as enlist other parties with an interest in conservation of animals and resources.

The RSIC uses both traditional teachings and practices as well as contemporary business methods and governmental practices. The tribe employs more than 300 people, with around half of those being tribal members.

== History ==
The people who inhabited the Great Basin prior to European settlement were the Numa or Numu (Northern Paiute), the waší·šiw (Washoe), the Newe (Shoshone), and the Nuwuvi (Southern Paiute). In each of these groups' language, their autonyms (names for themselves) meant "The People."

Bands within these groups were often known by names that referred to their geographic location or characteristic foods. For example, the Aga'idökadö referred to the trout eaters near the Walker River; the Toi Dükadü referred to the tule eaters near the Stillwater Marshes. The People continue to recognize their special place on Earth and all the life cycles.

Traditionally, The People lived a well-planned, harmonious life which was predicated on their immediate surroundings and nature. Time could not be wasted. Knowing what the land would offer was a matter of survival, thus The People's migration patterns were strategic and well-thought-out. The People followed the food and over the years, each band evolved as an efficient, social and economic unit that could comfortably inhabit the land.

Living in cycles with the seasons, the Numu occupied the strip now known as Western Nevada, Eastern Nevada, Eastern Oregon, and Southern Idaho. The Washeshu gathered annually at Lake Tahoe and dispersed for several hundred miles throughout the remainder of the year. The Newe were found in what is today called Eastern Nevada, Utah, and Southern California. The Nuwuvi inhabited the Colorado River Basin, where they cultivated corn, squash, and beans (the three sisters), and wheat.

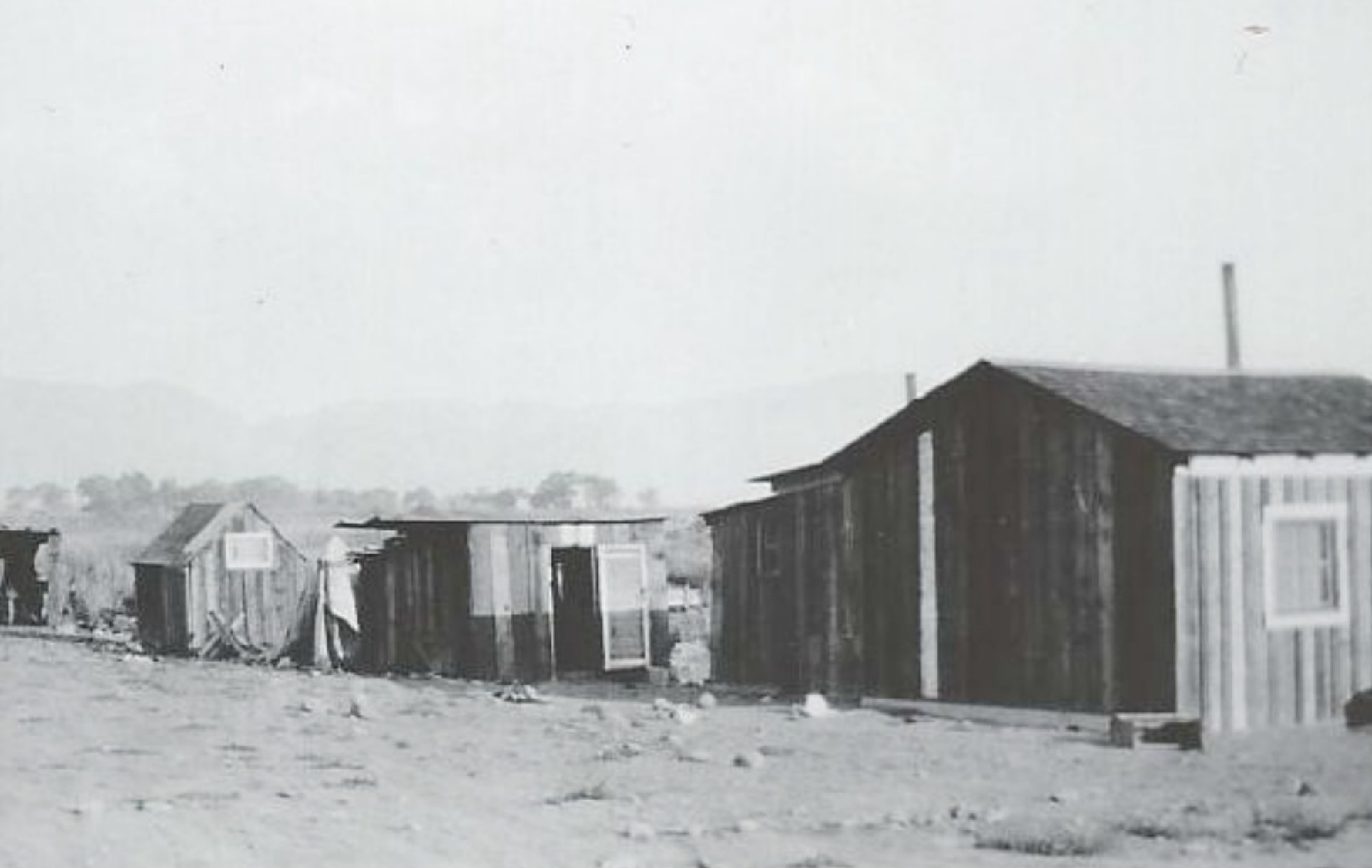
Typical dwellings at the Reno-Sparks Indian Colony, early 1900s

Each group believed that the animals of the Great Basin, on which they depended for many for food, also gave insight to creation and wise guidance on how to live. Each group spoke a different language: Washo is a Hokoan derivative; and the other dialects are of Uto-Aztecan origin. They lived in relative peace with other tribes, as all had territory for procuring resources. Much trade and commerce occurred among the original inhabitants of the entire continent. Conflicts occurred when a group raided or confiscated the resources of another group.

Archeological evidence places the earliest residents of Nevada as living here about 10,000 years ago. In 1994, the Nevada State Museum carbon-dated remains which were unearthed in 1940 near Fallon. According to modern science, the burial remains of the Spirit Cave mummy prove that he lived in the area more than 9,400 years ago.

Because Indian land in the Great Basin was one of the last major frontiers to be explored and settled by European-Americans, The People sustained their way-of-life and ethnic identity much longer than most Tribes in other parts of the country. When first contact occurred between Europeans and indigenous peoples in what would become Nevada, hundreds of other Tribes in areas of earlier settlement were already enduring the fourth major shift in U.S. Government policy toward American Indians.

From 1492-1828, or during the Colonial Period, Indians were dealt with as sovereign nations. Many treaties and agreements were negotiated with France and England, as these countries recognized that the Indians had their own form of government, their own leaders, and their own homelands.

Around 1830, the Spanish Trail opened in southern Nevada and explorers and trappers made their way into the arid landscape. In the beginning, many tribal groups were curious about these newcomers and The People attempted to establish relationships with them. Yet, as time went on, cohabitation was difficult.

Spanish records have little documentation of their explorers or traders being in Washo territory, but The People's oral history suggest there were encounters. Non-Indians first recorded being in Washo lands in 1826. The Shoshone and Northern Paiute also encountered non-Indians about this time.

The explorers and settlers did not understand how The People survived well in this area, using seasonal bounty and living lightly on the land. Settlers struggled to establish farms or ranches according to their known models.

The 1848 discovery of gold in California led to dramatic changes, as it attracted thousands of miners and merchants.

From 1778-1871 or during the Treaty Period, the U.S. government developed 370 treaties in an attempt to legally negotiate with Indian Tribes. During this era of nearly 100 years, these treaties often benefited those who were moving westward and not the tribes. The only treaty to impact Great Basin Indians was the Treaty with the Western Shoshoni [sic]. This agreement of "Peace and Friendship" was ratified in 1866.

By the middle of the 1800s, so many settlers inhabited the People's land that the Indians struggled to find food. Within five years, close to 250,000 people made their way across Nevada. This encroachment extremely limited and in some areas exhausted the food supply. Even the introduction of the horse to the Great Basin served as competition for food for the Indians. Cultural clashes soon developed, too. There was a significant difference in perspective regarding land occupation versus land ownership. The settlers believed in land ownership, meaning that once they chose an area in which to live, they tended to stay in that one location. Meanwhile, The People used the land seasonally and occupied limited areas for a short term.

As The People struggled to adapt, the federal government shifted its policy towards Indians again. The Indian Removal Act of 1830 halted any future treaties with tribes and it gave Congress the authority to isolate the People in order to allow economic growth throughout the United States. This was done through the creation of reservations.

The United States wanted to settle The People on reservations to extinguish their title to other lands and encourage them to adopt the western model of subsistence farming to assimilate to majority culture. The federal government believed that separating The People from the rest of its citizens would solve land disputes and reduce tensions between cultures. The development of reservations was a campaign promise of U.S. President Andrew Jackson. His administration set aside Indian Territory in lands west of the Mississippi River, far from the traditional homelands of the American Southeast and other areas from which they forced tribes.

In 1859, the Department of Interior recommended that land be set aside for Indian use north of the Truckee River and including Pyramid Lake. Though an executive order was issued in 1874 to establish the Pyramid Lake Reservation, the legal year of establishment is 1859.

During the Reservation Period, Nevada gained residents but it was approved for admission to the Union during the American Civil War, when President Abraham Lincoln wanted to forestall Confederate influence here. While the population did not meet regulations, the administration approved Nevada as a state in 1864.

In 1871, the Indian Appropriations Act gave the U.S. Congress (rather than the states) exclusive right and power to regulate trade and affairs with the Indian tribes. The U.S. Supreme Court legally designated Indians as domestic dependent nations and wards of the federal government.

In 1873 President Ulysses S. Grant established the Moapa River Paiute Reservation and the Walker River Paiute Indian Reservation by executive order.

From 1887-1934, the U.S. federal government, under the Dawes Act, allotted 160-acre plots to enrolled members of western reservations. (They were registered on what are known as the Dawes Rolls, which records are often integral to tribal membership documentation.)

In the early 20th century, the U.S. government commissioned a study to evaluate the conditions of Indian communities. The Meriam Report described the failures of the Dawes Act, finding that the overwhelming majority of Indian people on reservations were extremely poor, in bad health, living in primitive dwellings, and without adequate employment. It concluded that the Indians' societies could not thrive in the conditions forced onto them, and they should be encouraged to revive their traditional governments.

To improve conditions and encourage revitalization of self-government, Congress passed the Indian Reorganization Act of 1934 during the administration of President Franklin D. Roosevelt. It was called the Indian New Deal. The IRA permitted tribes to organize their own governments and incorporate their trust land. This is how the Reno-Sparks Indian Colony was established.

== Focus on Numa, Washo ==
At the turn of the century, many Numa and Washo lived in the Reno-Sparks area, not only because this was the aboriginal lands for The People, but more and more Indians moved to the area to find jobs. The transition to colonies represented another adaptive strategy for the Indians. Often, The People not living on a reservation were considered "scattered or homeless." These Indians tried to maintain some of their old ways by building traditional homes, sometimes with modern materials, in camps in urban areas, often near the Truckee River.

In 1917, the federal government purchased 20 acres for $6,000 for non-reservation Indians of Nevada and for homeless Indians. This land is the core of the present-day Colony. Most of the land was not cultivatable. The BIA dug irrigation ditches to provide some drinking water, but most of the Indians collected drinking water from a spring about a quarter of a mile away.

Initially, the Numa lived on the north side of the Colony, while the Washo lived on the south side of Colony. The Reno-Sparks Indian Colony and all colonies received some governmental services and were most often considered by the Bureau of Indian Affairs to be under their jurisdiction. For example, the purchase of additional land in 1926 was part of an effort to improve the water supply for the Colony. Plus, from 1920-1930, a nurse and a police officer, paid from federal government funds, were stationed at the Colony. Further, in 1938 the United States Supreme Court ruled that there was no distinction between a colony and a reservation which meant that the superintendence of the Colony fell to the federal government.

To that end, an additional 8.38 acres was added to the Colony in 1926. Purchased for about $4,000, this strip of land allowed for a day school. For many years, residents of the Colony sent their children to this local government operated school instead of a boarding school about 40 miles away. However, the Colony school was closed in the early 1940s because the building was in such disrepair. The Indian children's only option was to attend public school.

In 1945, Grace Warner, the principal of Orvis Ring School, invited the Indian students to attend her school. This arrangement which included bussing the Colony students to Orvis Ring, lasted until 1975 when the public school system required the Indian students to attend the school closest in proximity to the Colony. (Former Orvis Ring students may view history and reconnect on the Orvis Ring Facebook Group.)

As permissible under the IRA, the Reno-Sparks Indian Colony established its first formal council in 1934. On February 9, 1934 the elected council included three Paiute---Cleveland Cypher, Thomas Ochiho, and George Hooten, and three Washos---Willie Tondy, Jack Mahoney, and George McGinnis. Harry Sampson was selected Chairman of the Council.

In a letter to Nevada Senator Key Pitman, the new council supported the IRA, writing that the bill would be of lasting benefit to the progress of all Indians in the United States. Additionally, the new Colony leadership with input from Acting Bureau of Indian Affairs Superintendent John H. Holst, conducted a vote in which the IRA was overwhelmingly supported by the Colony residents.

Five men: Sampson, Cypher, Mahoney, Tondy, and George Hunter, drafted a constitution for the Colony. Additional assistance crafting the constitution came from George LaVatta, a Northern Shoshone from the Fort Hall Reservation who worked as a federal government field agent.

The Colony's constitution was adopted on December 16, 1935 and was approved by a vote of 51-1.

In 1936, the Colony tried to adopt a charter, but the BIA's field superintendent, Alida Bowler, delayed submitting the paperwork to the federal government. Bowler did not believe all the signatures were authentic as many Colony members who could not write, had someone else sign his or her name. Bowler returned the petition with instructions to have persons who could not write, make a cross or a thumbprint, but that action had to be witnessed by two other persons.

Most often charters enabled tribes to get credit which would assist the Indians with economic development. Bowler did not think the RSIC could get credit because it had no agricultural resources.

However, the Colony's charter, which was approved on January 7, 1939, included plans for the tribe to establish a cooperating laundry, a store, a meat market, a gas station, arrangements for the raising of poultry, and a harness repair shop for individual Indian members who wanted to do business for themselves.

Also under Sampson's leadership, the RSIC tried to take advantage of a provision in the IRA to purchase more land for the Colony.

With input from E. M. Johnstone, a BIA land field agent, LaVatta, and Bowler, a proposal for the purchase of 1,080 acres between Highway 40 and the Southern Pacific Railroad tracks in the Truckee Canyon was submitted to the Commissioner of Indian Affairs on January 25, 1937. This land purchase was never accomplished.

While the RSIC continued to build its sovereignty and explore economic opportunities, U.S. President Dwight D. Eisenhower changed the federal government's policy toward American Indians and began the Termination Era.

To deal with the Indians nationwide, Eisenhower sought complete elimination of the U.S. government's trust responsibility to the tribes. This meant that scores of tribes lost their federal benefits and support services, along with tribal jurisdiction over their lands. All told, the Termination Era, which lasted from 1945 to 1968, eliminated 109 tribal governments and reservations. Fortunately, no tribes in Nevada were terminated.

Finally, in 1970, U.S. President Nixon developed the latest national policy toward Indians, Tribal Self-Determination. Self-Determination gave autonomy to tribes by allowing the Indians to control their own affairs and be independent of federal oversight and still allow access to entitlements and money which is more sought after than true autonomy and independence.

2016 Today, the RSIC has expanded its original land base to just over 2,000 acres. The Colony employees over 350 employees and more than half are The People.

The tribe also maintains a tribal court system, a police force and a health clinic, and it provides full government services to its membership. The tribe's other governmental departments include administration, education, public works, social services, utility district, planning, prevention coalition, enrollment, human resources, economic development, and the chairman's department.

The tribal court has a judge, a clerk, an appeals clerk, a bailiff, and three other administrators who provide judicial services for criminal and civil proceedings pertaining to the tribe's jurisdiction and the enforcement of tribal ordinances.

This court manages the Tribal Court Advocate Services, which provides advocates to members accused of violating tribal laws. Its appeal procedure is handled by the Inter-Tribal Appellate Court of Nevada, which consists of a three-justice panel that meets each quarter during the year. It also has a probation program to supervise juvenile offenders.

The 11-person police force, which shares cross-jurisdiction with the State of Nevada, engages in community policing.

Business Enterprises and Economic Development Department The Reno-Sparks Indian Colony Business Enterprises and Economic Development Department manages the business enterprises for the benefit of all Colony and community members residing in the Reno and Hungry Valley communities. The business enterprises include the Colony's smoke shops and other commercial enterprises.

The Colony funds its tribal government from revenue generated by its enterprises, including tribal taxes levied on retail transactions occurring on Colony land. All five smoke shops assess sales/excise tax on tobacco product sales at a tax rate equivalent to the State of Nevada.

Recently, the Colony has been diversifying from reliance on declining tobacco revenues, concentrating on other types of commercial operations to enhance return and security. However, the tribal smoke shops and other commercial properties have helped generate revenues to provide and expand governmental services to Colony members, residents and neighboring communities.

Commercial Property Management

In an effort to diversify the Colony's general fund from sole reliance on tobacco revenues, the Colony has leased and developed its commercial sites. Tenants include Mercedes Benz of Reno, Acura of Reno, Infinity of Reno, Wal-Mart, and many other locally owned and operated businesses. Revenues from the Colony's real estate projects provide funds for the Colony's government which provides essential services to its members, residents and other urban Indians.

Economic Development

Creating a diverse economic base in support of the growing self-sufficiency of the Colony's members has been the principal focus of its economic development activities since the Tribal Council initiated its diversification efforts.

For over two decades, the Colony assembled development sites in Reno, Sparks and Washoe County. Located in urban, suburban and high-growth areas, this land has been acquired for development and redevelopment.

In addition, the Economic Development Department carries out design and development services for community projects such as construction of the $20 million Reno Sparks Tribal Health Center on Kuenzli Street along the Truckee River. The Tribal Health Center provides health care services to its members and Washoe County's urban Indians.

Other community and regional facilities currently are in the planning stage for construction in the next several years.

Through its development plans, the Colony seeks to partner with private businesses and with municipal, regional and state governments. One recent example of the latter partnerships is the Colony-funded installation of a new traffic signal system and roadway improvements at the cost of $509,000 on South Virginia and McCabe streets.

The Colony participated in the development of the floodwall and levee along the south bank of the Truckee River, prior to the construction of Wal-Mart on East Second Street in Reno. That undertaking involved the RSIC partnering with the Washoe County Flood Control Project, the Washoe County Public Works Department, the Nevada Department of State Lands, and Wal-Mart.

At the Colony's expense, the RSIC completed a $1.3 million environmental cleanup of the site with the assistance of a Brownfields Loan, administered by the Nevada Division of Environmental Protection.

Revenue Sharing

The Colony proposed legislation that will result in the Colony sharing revenue from its Wal-Mart project. The proposal, which was passed unanimously by the Nevada Legislature, will result in the Colony funding the design and construction of a new Northern Nevada Transitional Housing Center for the Nevada Department of Corrections. The Colony will also make annual payments to the Washoe County School District in the future.

The redevelopment of Reno's East Second Street neighborhood where half of the Colony's residents live, near Route 395, is another goal of economic development.

The tribe's residential community is surrounded by industrial land uses. In some instances, the Colony has purchased surrounding parcels which were redeveloped to provide a buffer between the residential and industrial land uses.

For instance, the Wal-Mart site was assembled by purchasing 12 industrial and commercial parcels. By redeveloping the site, and changing the land use to retail, other less desirable land uses were eliminated. Plus, walking paths along the Truckee River's floodwall and levee were constructed to provide public access to the river.

The Colony's development program is assisted by various federal incentives and agencies. For example, the Indian Employment Tax Credit is available to non-tribal employers who locate their businesses on Colony lands and hire tribal members. The Indian Accelerated Depreciation Schedule is available to those non-tribal businesses who conduct business on tribal lands.

Sites and Tenants

Each of the Colony's development sites consist of federal land held in trust for tribal benefit. These properties are available on a ground lease basis. The Colony manages four business development sites, is landlord to 20 commercial tenants and operates five Smoke Shops.

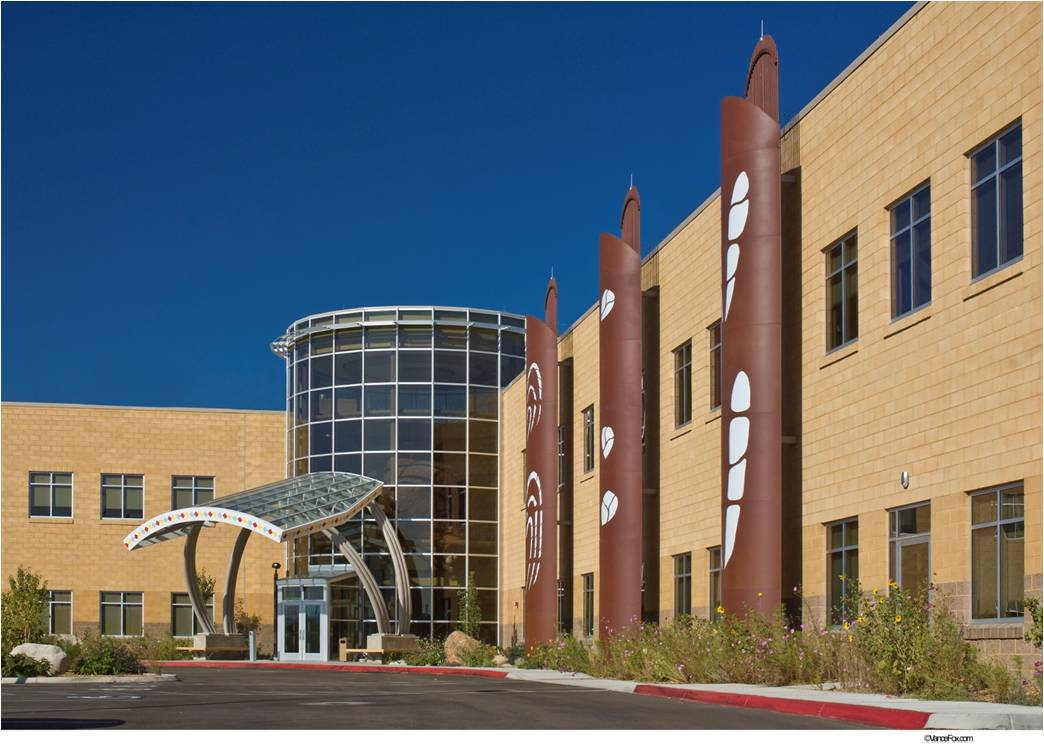

== See also ==
- Field Matron's Cottage, on the National Register of Historic Places, housed a library, infirmary and meeting place, built 1926
