= Round =

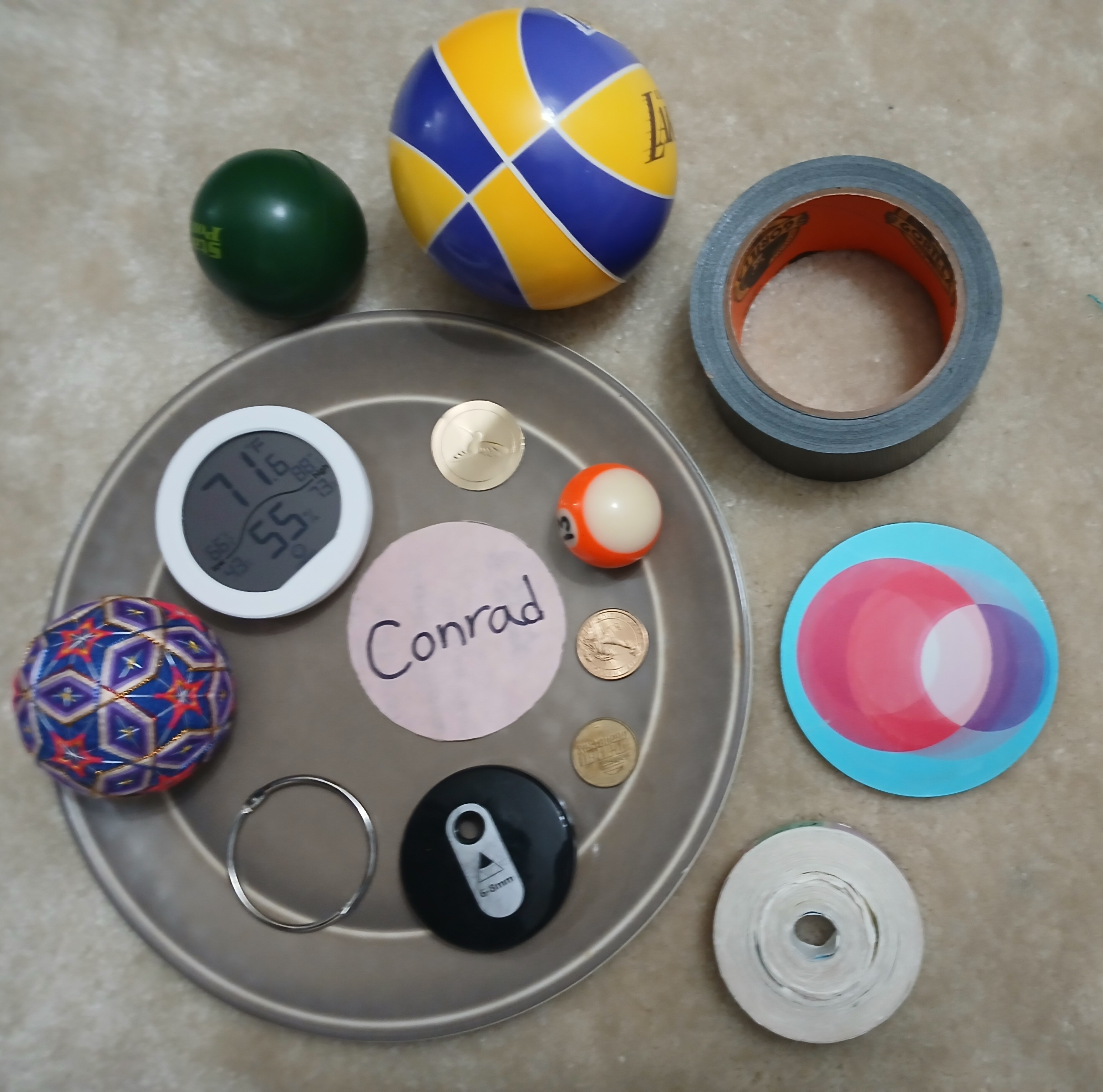
Various objects that are round

Round or rounds may refer to:

== Mathematics and science ==
- Having no sharp corners, as an ellipse, circle, or sphere
- Rounding, reducing the number of significant figures in a number
- Round number, ending with one or more zeroes
- Round (cryptography)
- Roundness (geology)
- Roundedness, the amount of rounding of the lips when pronouncing vowels
- Labialization, also called lip rounding, when pronouncing consonants

== Music ==
- Round (music), a type of composition
- Rounds (album), by Four Tet

== Places ==
- The Round, a theatre in England
- Round Point, in the South Shetland Islands
- Rounds Mountain, in the US
- Round Mountain (disambiguation), several places
- Round Valley (disambiguation), several places

== Repeated activities ==
- Round (boxing)
- Round (dominoes)
- Grand rounds, in medicine
- Round of drinks
- Funding round
- Doing or making the rounds, or patrol

== Other uses ==
- Round (surname)
- Rounds (surname)
- Round shot, ammunition
- Cartridge (firearms)
- Round steak
- Cattle
- Bullion coins that are not legal tender, e.g. silver rounds
- Rounds (website), a social network
- Rounds (video game)
- Rounding (film), a 2022 American drama film

== See also ==
- Circle
- Roundabout
- Around (disambiguation)
- Round and Round (disambiguation)
- Round Hill (disambiguation)
- Roundness (disambiguation)
- Theatre in the round
- OR
