= Denmark (disambiguation) =

Denmark is a constituent country of the Kingdom of Denmark, located in Northern Europe.

Denmark may also refer to:

== Political entities ==
- Kingdom of Denmark, a unitary sovereign state consisting of the constituent country of Denmark and two autonomous territories: the Faroe Islands and Greenland
- Denmark (European Parliament constituency), the associated constituency

== Communities ==
=== Australia ===
- Denmark, Western Australia, a town
- Shire of Denmark, Western Australia

=== Canada ===
- Denmark, Nova Scotia
- Denmark Parish, New Brunswick

=== United States ===
- Denmark, Georgia, an unincorporated community
- Denmark, Iowa, an unincorporated community and census-designated place
- Denmark, Kansas, an unincorporated community
- Denmark, Maine, a town
- Denmark, New York, a town
- Denmark, Ohio, an unincorporated community
- Denmark, Oregon, an unincorporated community
- Denmark, South Carolina, a city
- Denmark, Tennessee, an unincorporated community and former city
- Denmark, Wisconsin, a village
- Denmark Township (disambiguation)

== Geographic landforms ==
- Denmark Bay, Nunavut, Canada
- Denmark Peak, Alaska, United States
- Denmark River, Western Australia
- Danmark Island, Greenland
- Denmark Sound, Greenland
- Denmark Strait, between Iceland and Greenland
- Denmark Wash, a stream in Utah, United States
- Lake Denmark, New Jersey, United States

== People ==
- House of Denmark
- Denmark (name), list of people with the name

== Entertainment ==
- Denmark (2010 film), a short film
- Denmark (2020 film), a British film starring Rafe Spall, also known as One Way to Denmark
- "Denmark", a song by Claire Hamill from her album Touchpaper
- "Denmark", a song by The Chemical Brothers on their album Come with Us
- Denmark, the fictional personification of the country the manga Hetalia: Axis Powers by Hidekaz Himaruya

== Other uses ==
- Denmark Street, London
- Denmark station, Denmark, South Carolina, United States, a train station
- Denmark (horse), racing horse

== See also ==
- Danmark (armoured frigate), a Danish warship (1864–1900)
- New Denmark (disambiguation)
