= Peggy Berryhill =

Muscogee broadcast journalist

- Born: 1949 (age 76–77); Okmulgee, Oklahoma
- Citizenship: Muscogee (Creek) Nation; American
- Occupation: broadcast journalist
- Years active: 1973–present
- Awards: Muscogee Nation Hall of Fame (2014), American Academy of Arts and Sciences (2025)

Peggy Berryhill is a Muscogee broadcast journalist who began her career in 1973 at KPFA in Berkeley, California, where she produced the Native American-focused program Living on Indian Time. She has held various roles in public radio, including at National Public Radio (NPR) and multiple community stations. Berryhill is the owner and manager of KGUA 88.3 FM in Gualala, California, where she hosts Peggy's Place.

== Career ==
Berryhill is a citizen of Muscogee Nation. She is often referred to as the "First Lady of Native Radio." She began broadcast journalism in 1973 at KPFA in Berkeley, California, where she produced Living on Indian Time, a weekly one-hour program. This program focused on the Native American community, covering local and national news, conducting live interviews, and featuring music, field production, and recordings of events with Native American activists, authors, poets, and musicians. Berryhill has also held positions as a program director at KUNM, KPFA, and KALW. She was the only Native American person to have worked as a full-time producer at NPR in the Specialized Audience Programs Department from 1978 to 1979. In 1984, she was part of a subsidiary of the Native American Public Broadcasting Consortium of Lincoln, Nebraska which included news reporter and journalist Hattie Kauffman (Nez Perce), which had plans to create the "first commercial TV station" to be owned by a Native company.

Berryhill has been involved in organizing Native radio stations, training their producers, and supporting independent producers. During a period when the FCC opened opportunities for new radio channels, she encouraged tribal communities to apply for licenses in order to "become media owners and content providers." Recognizing the need for community information sharing and culturally relevant content, she argued that "If we don't supply our own voices who will?" She was referenced directly for this perspective during a Library of Congress panel in 2017 focused on preserving Native radio. In 2009, she was announced to be working with Sascha Meinrath to develop Media Blueprint Project, an initiative seeking to increase Native media capacity via broadband technology.

Her radio work includes collaborations with the National Museum of American History on the documentary series Spirits of the Present: The Legacy from Native America (hosted by Tantoo Cardinal) as well as collaborating or producing projects such as:

- California Indian Radio Project, a 13-part documentary series
- Club Red, starring comedian Charlie Hill
- Frank Day, Memory and Imagination, 1998 exhibition at New York's National Museum of the American Indian George Gustav Heye Center
- The Opening Moment
- Enduring Freedom: Honoring Native Women Veterans
- Horizons, NPR documentary series

== Awards and honors ==
Berryhill has won awards from the Corporation for Public Broadcasting and the Native American Journalists Association. She was awarded "Indian Media Person of the Year in Radio" in 1982 by the National Indian Media Conference, which was hosted by the Native American Public Broadcasting Consortium and the American Indian Film Institute. In 2011, she won the Badger Award from the National Federation of Community Broadcasters for her efforts supporting Native radio. Berryhill was inducted into the Muscogee Nation Hall of Fame in 2014.

In 2025, Berryhill was elected as a member of the American Academy of Arts and Sciences.

The career retrospective book on renowned artist Judith Lowry (Mountain Maidu, Pit River, and Washoe), published by the Nevada Museum of Art, includes a full-page callout quote from Berryhill.
