= Berry Creek =

Berry Creek may refer to:

- Berry Creek, California, U.S.
- Berry Creek Rancheria of Maidu Indians of California, a Native American tribe
- Berry Creek No. 214, a dissolved municipal district in Alberta, Canada
- Berry Creek, Special Area No. 2, Alberta, Canada
- Berry's Creek or Berry Creek, a river in Bergen County, New Jersey, U.S.

== See also ==
- Berry Creek Trail, in Grand Teton National Park, Wyoming, U.S.
