= Danmark =

Danmark may refer to:

- The Danish, Norwegian and Swedish name for the country of Denmark, see Etymology of Denmark
- The minor locality of Danmark in Uppsala Municipality, Sweden

Danmark is also a common ship's name:

- Danish ironclad Danmark, an armoured frigate, 1864–1900
- Danmark (ship, 1855), a three-masted bark used on the Danmark Expedition 1906–1908
- Danmark (ship, 1932), a full-rigged training ship, 1932 present

== See also ==
- Denmark (disambiguation)
