= Michopdo, California =

Michopdo
- Former settlement
- Location in California
- Coordinates: 39°43′55″N 121°51′14″W
- Country: United States
- State: California
- County: Butte
- Elevation: 187 ft (57 m)

Michopdo (also, Ma-chuc-na, Ma-chuck-nas, Mich-op-do, Michoapdos, Mitshopda, and Wachuknas) is a former Maidu settlement in Butte County, California, United States. It lay at an elevation of 187 feet (57 m).
