= Yamako, California =

Yamako
- Former settlement
- Country: United States
- State: California
- County: Nevada County

Yamako (variants: Yamagatock; Yumagatock) is a former Maidu village in Nevada County, California, that was located 9 mi (14 km) east of Nevada City.
