= Wokodot, California =

Wokodot
- Former settlement
- Location in California
- Coordinates: 39°15′50″N 120°01′00″W
- Country: United States
- State: California
- County: Nevada County
- Elevation: 2,510 ft (765 m)

Wokodot (Wo-ko'-dot) is a former Maidu village in Nevada County, California, that was located on the site of present-day Nevada City. It appears on a map published in 1905 by the American Museum of Natural History.
