= Ustoma, California =

Ustoma
- Former settlement
- Country: United States
- State: California
- County: Nevada County

Ustoma (pronounced: Us'-to-ma; variants: Oostomas, Ustu) is a former Maidu village in Nevada County, California, that was located near Nevada City.
