= Hopnomkoyo, California =

Hopnomkoyo is a former Maidu settlement in Plumas County, California, United States. It was located on Lights Creek, at an elevation of 6,824 feet (2,080 m), but its precise location is unknown.
