= Round Mountain =

Round Mountain may refer to:

== United States ==
=== Communities ===
- Round Mountain, Alabama
- Round Mountain, California
- Round Mountain, Nevada
- Round Mountain, Texas

=== Mountains ===
- Round Mountain (California), dormant volcanic cinder cone of the Clear Lake Volcanic Field located in Lake County
- Round Mountain (Taconic Mountains), on the Connecticut/Massachusetts border
- Round Mountain (Massachusetts), a former peak of the Holyoke Range, nearly leveled by quarrying
- Round Mountain, a mountain in Gallatin County, Montana
- Round Mountain, a mountain in Mineral County, Montana
- Round Mountain (Hamilton County, New York), in the Adirondack Mountains
- Round Mountain (Essex County, New York), in the Adirondack Mountains
- Round Mountain (Grand County, Utah), a summit in the Wasatch Range
- Round Mountain (Washington), in Skagit County
- Round Mountain, a mountain located near Mica Peak in Spokane County, Washington

=== Other uses ===
- Round Mountain Gold Mine
- Battle of Round Mountain, a battle during the U. S. Civil War for control of Indian Territory in 1861

== Antarctica ==
- Round Mountain (Antarctica), a peak in the Asgrad Range

== Australia ==
=== Community ===
- Round Mountain, New South Wales, a town in coastal northeastern New South Wales

=== Mountains ===
- Round Mountain (New England Tableland), a peak in the New England region of northeastern New South Wales
- Round Mountain (Snowy Mountains), a peak in the Snowy Mountains of southeastern New South Wales

== Canada ==
- Round Mountain (volcano), an eroded volcanic outcrop in the Garibaldi Volcanic Belt in British Columbia

== See also ==
- Rounds Mountain, a peak in the Taconic Mountains, United States
