= Round Valley =

Round Valley may refer to:

== United States ==
=== California ===
- Round Valley, California, a census-designated place in Inyo County, California
- Round Valley Indian Tribes of the Round Valley Reservation, an Indian reservation in Mendocino County, California
- Round Valley, a basin in Mendocino County, California, see Covelo, California
- Round Valley, Plumas County, California, a former settlement in Plumas County, California
- Round Valley (Pinto Mountain), a valley in San Bernardino County, California
- Round Valley Regional Preserve, in Contra Costa County, California

=== Other states ===
- Round Valley, Arizona, a census-designated place in Gila County, Arizona
- Round Valley Unified School District, in Apache County, Arizona
- Round Valley, Nebraska, an unincorporated community in Custer County, Nebraska
- Round Valley Reservoir, in Hunterdon County, New Jersey
- Round Valley (Millard County, Utah), a valley in Millard County and Sevier County, Utah; see Denmark Wash

== Other places ==
- Rural Municipality of Round Valley No. 410, Saskatchewan, Canada

== Other uses ==
- Round Valley Settler Massacres of 1856–1859, an attack on Yuki people in Mendocino County, California
