= Yuman, California =

Yuman
- Former settlement
- Location in California
- Coordinates: 39°30′45″N 121°33′29″W
- Country: United States
- State: California
- County: Butte
- Elevation: 171 ft (52 m)

Yuman is a former Maidu settlement in Butte County, California, United States. It lay at an elevation of 171 feet (52 m). Its location is currently within the city limits of Oroville.
