= Ben Cheney =

American businessman (1905–1971)

- Born: Ben Bradbury Cheney; March 24, 1905; Lima, Montana, U.S.
- Died: May 18, 1971 (aged 66); Tacoma, Washington, U.S.

Ben Bradbury Cheney (March 24, 1905 – May 18, 1971) was an American businessman and sports enthusiast active in the states of the U.S. Pacific Coast. Born in Lima, Montana, in 1905, he moved to live with his grandparents in South Bend, Washington, at the age of eight; in 1924 he moved to Tacoma to attend business college. He founded the Cheney Lumber Company in 1936.

He is known for his efforts in constructing Cheney Stadium in Tacoma, Washington, today home to the Tacoma Rainiers of Minor League Baseball.

In the lumber industry, Cheney established mills in Tacoma and in Medford, Oregon. He also constructed mills in Greenville, Pondosa, and Arcata, California. Cheney came up with the idea of standardizing an 8-foot 2-by-4 around 1937 as a way to use timber that was wasted when railroad ties were cut out of large logs. By 1940, large railroad car loads of 2x4s were beginning to be shipped and used in construction.

As a sports enthusiast, Cheney sponsored sports teams in all the towns in which he was in business. He held an 11% stake in the San Francisco Giants. Cheney is most famous for helping build Cheney Stadium in Tacoma, personally contributing $100,000 to cover construction overruns of the stadium. A grinning, life-size bronze statue of Cheney, complete with scorecard and peanuts, occupies a front row seat in the grandstand of Cheney Stadium.

In 1955, Cheney established the Cheney Foundation, a charity that encourages the growth and prosperity of communities where the Cheney Lumber Company was once active. Cheney died in Tacoma in 1971, bequeathing $10 million to his ongoing charity.
