= Yauko, California =

Yauko is a former Maidu settlement in Butte County, California, United States. It was located approximately 7 miles (11 km) northeast of Chico; its precise location is unknown.
