= Berry Creek Rancheria of Maidu Indians of California =

Indian tribe in California, United States

Total population
- 304

Regions with significant populations
- Northern California

Languages
- English, Konkow language

Religion
- Kuksu religion

Related ethnic groups
- other Maidu peoples

The Berry Creek Rancheria of Maidu Indians of California are a federally recognized Native American tribe based in northeastern California, south of Lassen Peak. They historically have spoken the Konkow language, also known as Northwest Maidu.

They are a federally recognized Maidu tribe headquartered in Oroville in Butte County.

== Reservation ==
Location of Berry Creek Rancheria

Their reservation is 65 acres (260,000 m^{2}), located in two separate geographical sites: one (39°30′09″N 121°30′16″W) near Oroville in the community of Oroville East, and the other (39°37′32″N 121°19′40″W) at the eastern edge of the community of Berry Creek, within a mile of the Feather River.

Their historical territory was along the Feather River and in the foothills of the Sierra Nevada, about 20 miles south of present-day Oroville. 39.625641°N 121.327781°W

Of the tribe's 304 enrolled citizens, 136 live on the reservation.

== Language ==
The Konkow language, called Koyoomk’awi or Northwest Maidu, is a Maidu language. The anthropologist Alfred Kroeber estimated that once 9,000 people spoke Konkow. Today, a few people still speak the language.

== Government ==
The tribe is managed by an elected tribal council. They hold elections every four years. Their current tribal chairman is Francis Steele.

== Enrollment ==
The tribe has approximately 304 enrolled citizens.

== Education ==
The ranchería is served by the Pioneer Union Elementary School District and Oroville Union High School District.

== Notable Berry Creek Rancheria members ==
- Frank Day (1902–1976), artist

== See also ==
- List of Indian reservations in the United States
