= Nakankoyo, California =

Nakankoyo (also, Naku) is a former Maidu village in Plumas County, California, United States. It was located at Big Spring, but its precise location is unknown.
