= Tsekankan, California =

Tsekankan
- Former settlement
- Country: United States
- State: California
- County: Nevada County

Tsekankan is a former Maidu village in Nevada County, California,. that was located southeast of Nevada City. It appears on a map published in 1905 by the American Museum of Natural History.
