= Kalkalya, California =

Former Maidu settlement in Butte County, California

Kalkalya is a former Maidu settlement in Butte County, California, United States. Its precise location is unknown.
