= Calvin S. Brice =

American politician

Calvin Brice
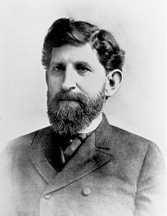

United States Senator from Ohio
- In office March 4, 1891 – March 3, 1897
- Preceded by: Henry B. Payne
- Succeeded by: Joseph B. Foraker

Chair of the Democratic National Committee
- In office 1889–1892
- Preceded by: William Barnum
- Succeeded by: William F. Harrity

Personal details
- Born: Calvin Stewart Brice; September 17, 1845 Denmark, Ohio, U.S.
- Died: December 15, 1898 (aged 53) New York City, U.S.
- Party: Democratic
- Education: Miami University (BA)

Calvin Stewart Brice (September 17, 1845 – December 15, 1898) was an American businessman and Democratic politician from Ohio. He is best remembered for his single term in the United States Senate, his role as chairman of the Democratic National Committee, and his formative role in the American rail industry. He was a leading Bourbon Democrat.

== Early life ==
Calvin Brice was born on September 17, 1845, to William Kirkpatrick and Elizabeth Stewart Brice in Denmark, Ohio. His father was a Presbyterian minister of no great wealth. He was home-schooled for a time before entering the Columbus Grove public school system in Putnam County. After showing some promise as a student, Brice gained admission to Miami University in 1859.

Brice's first attempt to join the army in 1861 met with little success, after being turned down because of his young age. In the summer of 1862, however, Brice enlisted and served three months in the 86th Regiment of the Ohio Volunteer Infantry, seeing action in West Virginia. In 1863, he returned to and graduated from Miami University with high honors and worked as a schoolmaster, before he joined the army again in 1864, this time serving as captain to a company of volunteers he recruited for the 180th Ohio Infantry. Brice rose rapidly through the ranks of the Union Army and, by the end of the war, attained the position of Lieutenant-Colonel.

With "no desire for an army career," according to historian Thomas Mach, Brice ended his military career soon after to pursue a career in law. He earned his law degree from the University of Michigan Law School in 1865 and passed the Ohio bar in 1866.

== Business career ==
Brice found his break into both the business and political worlds under unusual circumstances. Around 1880, with his law practice proving unsuccessful and his mother's home at risk of foreclosure, Brice offered to attend to any legal interests with which the mortgage lender needed help. The lender, then-Governor Charles Foster, declined the legal help but offered to pay Brice five hundred dollars to negotiate a business deal with Wall Street on his behalf. Brice accepted and proved a shrewd businessman; Ignoring Foster's explicit instructions for his work on the business proceedings in New York and instead following his instincts, Brice returned with a shocking profit of $40,000 and earned the trust and friendship of the Governor. Foster would later name Brice "the most remarkable man [he] ever met […] the most successful borrower [he] ever saw." Throughout his business career, two themes were consistent: Brice's ability to restructure a failing or fledgling business to turn a profit and his involvement with Charles Foster, whose support was crucial to Brice's success.

After working in private practice, Brice joined the legal department of the Lake Erie and Louisville Railroad. There, he gained his initial experience in the railroad industry, learning how to operate, fund, and expand a rail network. In 1871, Brice traveled to Europe to secure funding for a foundering railway running from Toledo to Ohio's coal fields, impressing Foster once more. With Foster's support, Brice guided the railroad through the Panic of 1873 and expanded it into Lima and the surrounding region. His most notable achievement was perhaps his role in the 1882 construction of the Nickel Plate Road which ran from New York to St. Louis. He later sold this road for a generous profit to William Henry Vanderbilt, who recognized it as a dangerous competitor. Brice rose to President of the company in 1887, which by then was known as the Lake Erie and Western Railroad.

Over time, Brice netted a great fortune, laying claim to ten different railroads while spreading into numerous other businesses, including the National Telegraph Company and the Chase National Bank of New York.

Later in life, Brice became involved with railroad projects in China. He was a founding member of the American Asiatic Association, an organization responsible for pursuing American trade interests in China under the Open Door Policy. In the late 1890s, he began an attempt to build a railroad between Canton and Hankou on mainland China, but he died before the project was completed.

Throughout his career, Brice remained selfless in his aims and frugal in his desires, unlike most of the so-called robber barons of his day. According to historian James White, Brice did not accept much compensation for his services during a business transaction and often held himself accountable to the public by "stripping a proposition of every incumbrance and laying it bare for inspection."

== Political career ==
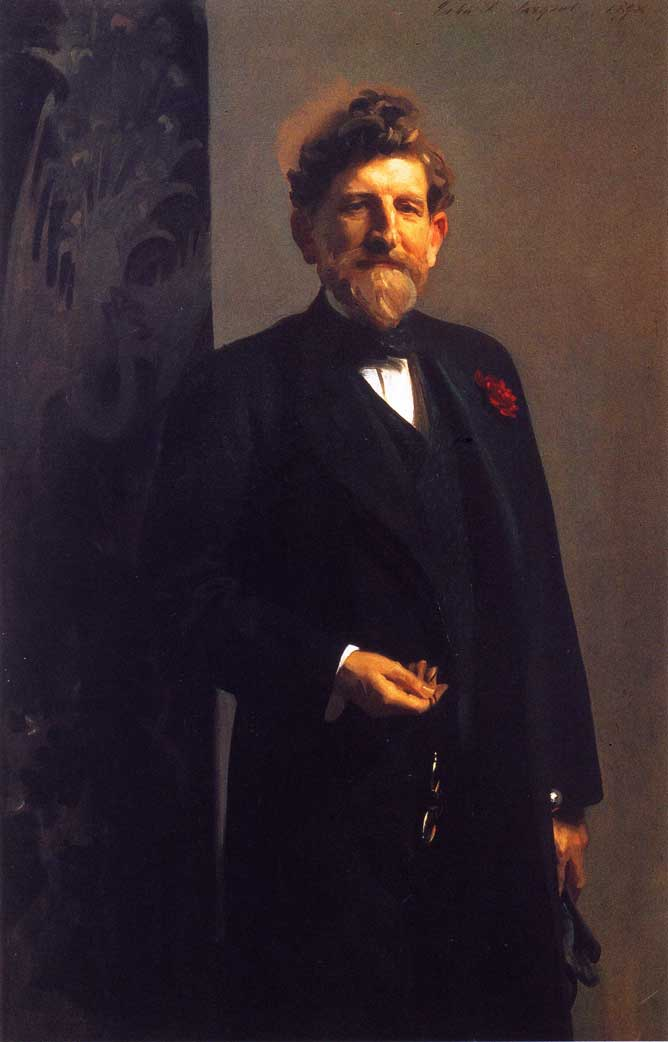
Senator Calvin Brice by John Singer Sargent, 1898

Alongside his business career, Brice played an increasing role in state and national politics. He was a conservative Bourbon Democrat. Brice got his start in politics as an elector for Samuel J. Tilden in 1876 and later worked for the successful 1884 presidential campaign of Grover Cleveland.

=== DNC Chair ===
After Cleveland's election, Brice became more active in the Democratic Party and was elected as a delegate-at-large to the 1888 Democratic National Convention in St. Louis. In 1889, Brice was chosen to replace the late William H. Barnum as Chairman of the Democratic National Committee. His wealth and connections made him an influential party chairman, earning him the nickname "Calvin $ellars Brice". He served until 1892, when was replaced in that position by William Harrity of Pennsylvania after expressing doubts about nominating Grover Cleveland for a third time.

=== U.S. Senator ===
In 1890, Brice won the nomination over John A. McMahon as his party's candidate to succeed George H. Payne, the outgoing U.S. Senator from Ohio. Brice was subject to media criticism, including over claims that he was not an Ohio resident, having lived in New York in the previous years. Heavy campaign spending secured the election of a Democratic majority to the Ohio General Assembly, enabling Brice's selection. Because of suspicious circumstances deriving from Payne's initial selection, though, Brice was scrutinized by the Senate before assuming office.

Although Brice enacted few memorable measures as Senator, he gained a reputation as a hard-working and intelligent member, serving as Chairman of the Committee on Pacific Railroads and member of the Democratic Steering Committee and Committee on Appropriations.

Brice's reversal on the critical issue of tariff reform cost him the support of many in his Democratic base. Brice's strong ties to New York businesses led some in Ohio to call him "New York's Third Senator". Though Brice fended off a censure motion at the 1894 Democratic party state convention, he lost his bid for reelection to Republican Joseph B. Foraker three years later. After his defeat, Brice dropped out of Ohio politics.

== Death ==
He died suddenly and unexpectedly in New York City of an acute attack of pneumonia on December 15, 1898.

== Legacy ==
The mining town of Briceville, Tennessee, which he proved instrumental in helping to connect to railroad service, is named for him.

Brice was a devoted alumnus of Miami University later in life. His efforts in 1885 and 1888 to provide funding for the university were largely responsible for its survival, and a science building, Brice Hall was named in his honor. It has since been demolished.

== See also ==
- New York, Chicago and St. Louis Railroad
- List of United States senators from Ohio
- Briceville, Tennessee

Party political offices
Preceded by William Barnum	Chair of the Democratic National Committee; 1889–1892	Succeeded by William F. Harrity
U.S. Senate
Preceded by Henry B. Payne	U.S. Senator (Class 3) from Ohio; 1891–1897; Served alongside: John Sherman	Succeeded by Joseph B. Foraker
