= Round Hill, Virginia =

Round Hill or Roundhill is the name of several communities in the U.S. state of Virginia.

- Round Hill, Frederick County, Virginia
- Round Hill, Loudoun County, Virginia (incorporated)
- Round Hill, Rappahannock County, Virginia
- Roundhill, Roanoke, Virginia (neighborhood)
