= Sunusi, California =

Coordinates: 39.6129°N 121.9607°W

Sunusi is a former Maidu settlement in Butte County, California, United States. It was located on the east side of the Sacramento River on the Parrot Grant, south of Parrot Landing.
