= Pondosa =

Pondosa may refer to the following places in the United States:

- Pondosa, California, unincorporated community in Siskiyou County, California
- Pondosa, Oregon, unincorporated community in Union County, Oregon
