= Greenville, California =

- Unincorporated community Census-designated place
- Location in Plumas County and the state of California

- Location within California Location within the United States
- Coordinates: 40°8′23″N 120°57′4″W
- Country: United States
- State: California
- County: Plumas

Area
  - Total: 7.993 sq mi (20.702 km^{2})
  - Land: 7.993 sq mi (20.702 km^{2})
  - Water: 0 sq mi (0 km^{2}) 0%
- Elevation: 3,586 ft (1,093 m)

Population (2020)
  - Total: 1,026
  - Density: 128.4/sq mi (49.56/km^{2})
- Time zone: UTC-8 (Pacific (PST))
  - Summer (DST): UTC-7 (PDT)
- ZIP code: 95947
- Area code: 530
- FIPS code: 06-31162
- GNIS ID: 1658666

Greenville (Northeast Maidu: Kotassi) is an unincorporated community in Plumas County, California, United States, on the north-west side of Indian Valley. Most of the buildings were destroyed by the Dixie Fire in August 2021. The population was 1,026 at the 2020 census, down from 1,129 at the 2010 census. For statistical purposes, the United States Census Bureau has defined Greenville as a census-designated place (CDP). According to the Census Bureau, the CDP has a total area of 8.0 square miles (21 km^{2}), all of it land.

== History ==
The Maidu people had been living in the valley area around present-day Greenville for centuries when English-speaking settlers arrived in the 1850s during the Gold Rush. Among the earliest structures built in the community was a boarding house operated by Mr. and Mrs. Green. The community was named for Green, who was killed in the collapse of the first Round Valley Dam. When Henry C. Bidwell arrived in 1862 and opened a trading post, several business owners moved down from Round Valley to Greenville. Since its establishment, the main industries of Greenville were mining and logging, however, by the mid 1900s, mining had declined and logging and ranching became the main industries in Greenville. In the late 1800s, the Maidu tribe were granted over 200 acres of land by the US government where a boarding school was built which burned down in the 1920s. The land was later converted into a Rancheria.

Cheney Lumber Company built a wood mill near Greenville.

=== Fires ===
A fire destroyed many buildings in 1881; they were quickly rebuilt. Greenville's population in 1882 was 500.

On August 4, 2021, about 75 percent of Greenville's buildings were destroyed by the Dixie Fire, the largest single (i.e. non-complex) wildfire in the state's history, and the second-largest overall (after the August Complex fire of 2020). Fire officials stated that the library, fire department, and most downtown homes were burned. The Los Angeles Times estimated that about $1 billion, through government aid, insurance payouts, lawsuits against Pacific Gas & Electric, corporate investment and philanthropic donations, has been promised, paid or will be forced to pay for the damage and rebuilding of Greenville.

It is stated that nobody died in the fire. The single casualty from the incident was a firefighter who died from complications with COVID-19.

== Geography ==
=== Climate ===
This region experiences hot and dry summers with temps as high as 108 °F (42 °C) and cold sometimes wet winters, which can get as cold as −14 °F (−26 °C). According to the Köppen Climate Classification system, Greenville has a warm-summer Mediterranean climate, abbreviated "Csb" on climate maps. Its winter temperatures approach that of a continental climate, and diurnal temperature variation is large, especially during summer.

Climate data for Greenville
Month	Jan	Feb	Mar	Apr	May	Jun	Jul	Aug	Sep	Oct	Nov	Dec	Year
Record high °F (°C)	70 (21)	69 (21)	77 (25)	89 (32)	98 (37)	99 (37)	105 (41)	106 (41)	108 (42)	90 (32)	77 (25)	70 (21)	108 (42)
Mean daily maximum °F (°C)	45.6 (7.6)	50.8 (10.4)	55.3 (12.9)	63.2 (17.3)	70.3 (21.3)	79.2 (26.2)	89 (32)	88.1 (31.2)	81.9 (27.7)	70.3 (21.3)	55.9 (13.3)	46.6 (8.1)	66.35 (19.08)
Mean daily minimum °F (°C)	22 (−6)	24.6 (−4.1)	27.6 (−2.4)	30.6 (−0.8)	35.2 (1.8)	39.5 (4.2)	42.7 (5.9)	40.8 (4.9)	36.5 (2.5)	31.5 (−0.3)	27.1 (−2.7)	21.1 (−6.1)	31.6 (−0.2)
Record low °F (°C)	−14 (−26)	−11 (−24)	3 (−16)	16 (−9)	20 (−7)	24 (−4)	24 (−4)	20 (−7)	16 (−9)	10 (−12)	6 (−14)	−4 (−20)	−14 (−26)
Average precipitation inches (mm)	8.2 (210)	6.1 (150)	5.3 (130)	2.6 (66)	1.6 (41)	0.8 (20)	0.3 (7.6)	0.3 (7.6)	0.8 (20)	2.3 (58)	4.7 (120)	6.2 (160)	39.3 (1,000)
Average snowfall inches (cm)	19.7 (50)	10.6 (27)	9.9 (25)	2 (5.1)	0.4 (1.0)	0 (0)	0 (0)	0 (0)	0 (0)	0.3 (0.76)	1.8 (4.6)	7.8 (20)	52.5 (133)
Average precipitation days	10	9	10	7	6	4	1	1	3	5	7	9	72

== Demographics ==
Historical population
Census	Pop.	Note	%±
1960	1,140		—
1970	1,073		−5.9%
1980	1,537		43.2%
1990	1,396		−9.2%
2000	1,160		−16.9%
2010	1,129		−2.7%
2020	1,026		−9.1%
U.S. Decennial Census; 1860–1870 1880-1890; 1900 1910 1920; 1930 1940 1950; 1960 1970 1980; 1990 2000 2010

For statistical purposes, the United States Census Bureau has defined Greenville as a census-designated place (CDP).

=== Racial and ethnic composition ===
Greenville CDP, California – Racial and ethnic composition Note: the US Census treats Hispanic/Latino as an ethnic category. This table excludes Latinos from the racial categories and assigns them to a separate category. Hispanics/Latinos may be of any race.
Race / Ethnicity (NH = Non-Hispanic)	Pop 2000	Pop 2010	Pop 2020	% 2000	% 2010	% 2020
White alone (NH)	933	830	752	80.43%	73.52%	73.29%
Black or African American alone (NH)	1	0	7	0.09%	0.00%	0.68%
Native American or Alaska Native alone (NH)	83	118	90	7.16%	10.45%	8.77%
Asian alone (NH)	3	11	2	0.26%	0.97%	0.19%
Native Hawaiian or Pacific Islander alone (NH)	0	0	1	0.00%	0.00%	0.10%
Other race alone (NH)	1	0	9	0.09%	0.00%	0.88%
Mixed race or Multiracial (NH)	31	61	76	2.67%	5.40%	7.41%
Hispanic or Latino (any race)	108	109	89	9.31%	9.65%	8.67%
Total	1,160	1,129	1,026	100.00%	100.00%	100.00%

=== 2020 census ===
As of the 2020 census, Greenville had a population of 1,026 and a population density of 128.4 inhabitants per square mile (49.6/km^{2}).

0.0% of residents lived in urban areas, while 100.0% lived in rural areas.

The whole population lived in households. There were 491 households, out of which 118 (24.0%) had children under the age of 18 living in them, 164 (33.4%) were married-couple households, 52 (10.6%) were cohabiting couple households, 138 (28.1%) had a female householder with no partner present, and 137 (27.9%) had a male householder with no partner present. 170 households (34.6%) were one person, and 93 (18.9%) were one person aged 65 or older. The average household size was 2.09. There were 261 families (53.2% of all households).

The age distribution was 178 people (17.3%) under the age of 18, 65 people (6.3%) aged 18 to 24, 229 people (22.3%) aged 25 to 44, 281 people (27.4%) aged 45 to 64, and 273 people (26.6%) who were 65 years of age or older. The median age was 48.5 years. For every 100 females, there were 102.4 males, and for every 100 females age 18 and over, there were 101.4 males.

There were 595 housing units at an average density of 74.4 units per square mile (28.7 units/km^{2}), of which 491 (82.5%) were occupied. Of these, 265 (54.0%) were owner-occupied, and 226 (46.0%) were occupied by renters. The homeowner vacancy rate was 5.4% and the rental vacancy rate was 3.8%.

=== 2010 census ===
At the 2010 census Greenville had a population of 1,129. The population density was 141.3 inhabitants per square mile (54.6/km^{2}). The racial makeup of Greenville was 897 (79.5%) White, Hispanic or Latino of any race were 109 people (9.7%), 1 (0.1%) African American, 133 (11.8%) Native American, 11 (1.0%) Asian, 0 (0.0%) Pacific Islander, 17 (1.5%) from other races, and 70 (6.2%) from two or more races.

The whole population lived in households, no one lived in non-institutionalized group quarters and no one was institutionalized.

There were 496 households, 139 (28.0%) had children under the age of 18 living in them, 181 (36.5%) were opposite-sex married couples living together, 77 (15.5%) had a female householder with no husband present, 25 (5.0%) had a male householder with no wife present. There were 52 (10.5%) unmarried opposite-sex partnerships, and 3 (0.6%) same-sex married couples or partnerships. 171 households (34.5%) were one person and 67 (13.5%) had someone living alone who was 65 or older. The average household size was 2.28. There were 283 families (57.1% of households); the average family size was 2.91.

The age distribution was 256 people (22.7%) under the age of 18, 78 people (6.9%) aged 18 to 24, 227 people (20.1%) aged 25 to 44, 378 people (33.5%) aged 45 to 64, and 190 people (16.8%) who were 65 or older. The median age was 45.4 years. For every 100 females, there were 97.4 males. For every 100 females age 18 and over, there were 95.3 males.

There were 613 housing units at an average density of 76.7 per square mile, of the occupied units 251 (50.6%) were owner-occupied and 245 (49.4%) were rented. The homeowner vacancy rate was 4.9%; the rental vacancy rate was 9.2%. 583 people (51.6% of the population) lived in owner-occupied housing units and 546 people (48.4%) lived in rental housing units.

== Government ==
In the state legislature, Greenville is in the 1st senatorial district, represented by Republican Megan Dahle, and the 1st Assembly district, represented by Republican Heather Hadwick. Federally, Greenville is in California's 3rd congressional district, represented by Independent Kevin Kiley.

== Education ==
The school district is Plumas Unified School District. Greenville's students attend the Indian Valley Elementary and Greenville Junior/Senior High Schools. The school's mascots are the 'Wolf Pack' for the elementary school and the 'Indians' for the Junior/Senior High School.

== Infrastructure ==
California State Route 89 passes through Greenville.

== Notable people ==
- James Marsters (born 1962), actor and musician
- Marie Mason Potts (1895–1978), Mountain Maidu journalist and activist; attended Greenville Indian School for a few years.
- Bill Wattenburg (1936–2018), inventor, author, and radio talk show host

== See also ==
- Greenville Rancheria of Maidu Indians, headquartered in Greenville
