= Marie Mason Potts =

Maidu activist and writer (1895–1978)

- Chankutpan
- Born: Marie Mason; 1895; Big Meadows (now known as Chester), Plumas County, California, U.S.
- Died: June 24, 1978 (aged 82–83); Susanville, Lassen County, California, U.S.
- Other names: Marie Potts, Chankutpan, "One With Sharp Eyes"
- Citizenship: American, Maidu Tribe of the Federated Indians of California
- Occupations: Maidu cultural leader, activist, educator, author, journalist, editor
- Spouse: Hensley Potts (m. 1915)
- Children: 7

Marie Mason Potts (1895 – 1978) was a Mountain Maidu cultural leader, activist, educator, writer, journalist, and editor. She was an influential California Native American activist who travel lectured on tribal sovereignty, heritage, and cultural preservation. Potts had authored two books, "The Northern Maidu" (1971) and "Honey Run Bridge". She was also known as Chankutpan, "One With Sharp Eyes", and née Marie Mason.

== Early life and education ==
Marie Mason was born in 1895, in Big Meadows (now known as Chester), Plumas County, California. Her father was a minerals prospector of European-origins that had sexually assaulted her mother; and then left her as a single parent. She was a member of the Maidu Tribe of the Federated Indians of California.

She attended the Greenville Indian School in Greenville, California, from 1900 to 1912; and the Carlisle Indian Industrial School in Carlisle, Pennsylvania, from 1912 to 1915. She wrote for The Carlisle Arrow, a student newspaper. Potts was the first of California Indians to graduate from Carlisle School.

In 1915, she married her former classmate from Greenville, Hensley Potts (Concow Maidu), and together they had 7 children. Starting in 1942, the family moved to Sacramento, California.

== Career ==
In 1946 and 1947, she participated in the founding of the Federated Indians of California (FIC), an organization formed to support land claims case before the judicial relations arbiter Indian Claims Commission, against the United States government. For three decades Potts was an editor of the FIC alternative newspaper, "The Smoke Signal" (published from 1947 until 1977). It has been reported as the earliest Native American newspaper.

Potts was a founding member of the Sacramento Indian Center, and the American Indian Press Association Intertribal Council Center. She was a part of a group that later became the California Education Association. Potts taught American and Californian Native American history at California State University, Sacramento (CSU).

Potts was a participant in the Occupation of Alcatraz protests in 1969 to 1971.

== Death and legacy ==
She died on June 24, 1978, in Susanville, Lassen County, California, when traveling.

In 1975, she was honored by the state of California; and in 1977 the California State Park and Recreation Department. The California State Department of Health, Education, and Welfare (now the California Department of Public Health) had a building named after her and included a lobby plaque in her dedication.

== Publications ==
- Potts, Marie (1971). The Northern Maidu. Happy Camp, CA: Naturegraph and Keven Brown Publications. ISBN 978-0879610708.
- Potts, Marie (1981). "My Childhood". In Margolin, Malcolm (ed.). The Way We Lived: California Indian Stories, Songs & Reminiscences. Berkeley: Heyday. pp. 15–16. ISBN 0-930588-55-X.

== See also ==
- List of Indigenous writers of the Americas
