= Judith Lowry (artist) =

Native American artist

- Born: 1948 (age 77–78); Washington, D.C., United States
- Education: Humboldt State University
- Alma mater: Chico State University

Judith Lowry (born 1948 in Washington, DC) is a Native American artist. Based in Northern California, she is Maidu and Achomawi and enrolled in the Pit River Tribe. Lowry primarily works in acrylics on canvas.

== Life ==
Leonard Lowry, Maidu and Achomawi, a member of the Pit River Tribe was Judith Lowry's father. She has stated, "My paternal family heritage is Mountain Maidu with blood ties to the Paiute, Washo, Modoc, Pit River tribes." Her mother, June Shirley Harrison, is Australian. Her parents met during World War II when her father was stationed in her mother's native Sydney, Australia. He was one of the most decorated Native American soldiers.

Initially Lowry didn't attend college; she got married, raised children, and worked as a hairdresser. She also took photographs at weddings and community events. She settled in her father's hometown of Susanville, California. Eventually, in her thirties Lowry did go back to school, and attended Humboldt State University.

== Art career ==
"There is one distinction I have to make. I am not a painter.
I paint. I am a storyteller."

Lowry won her first competition at the age of six for a drawing of a Hieronymus Bosch-esque world with strange vibrant creatures.

Lowry earned a Bachelor of Fine Arts degree from Humboldt State University and a Master of Fine Arts in painting and drawing from Chico State University. Lowry's work is influenced by Frank Day, Harry Fonseca, Fra Angelico, Giotto, and Sandro Botticelli. Her works frequently reference themes including consumerism, fashion, relationships, death, and the representation of Native American people in contemporary culture. Her work is influenced by early Renaissance painting and the tradition of native California story-telling. Lowry frequently works in oil and acrylics creating "larger-than-life" images that favour "allegorical sensibilit[ies]."

Lowry's studio is in Nevada City, California.

== Exhibitions ==
Lowry's paintings have been exhibited at the Crocker Art Museum, the Wheelwright Museum, the Carl M. Gorman Museum, the Heard Museum, and the George Gustav Heye Center. In 2012, she showed at the Pence Gallery.

Lowry's work was part of Stretching the Canvas: Eight Decades of Native Painting (2019–21), a survey at the National Museum of the American Indian George Gustav Heye Center in New York.

== Collections ==
Lowry's paintings are in the collections of the National Museum of the American Indian and Peabody Essex Museum.
