= James K. Jones =

American politician (1839–1908)

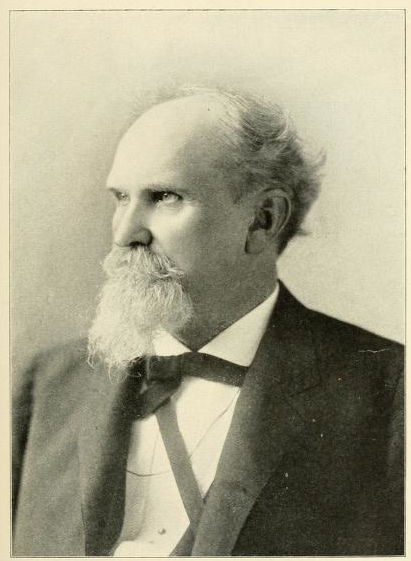

Chair of the Senate Democratic Caucus
- In office December 1899 – March 3, 1903
- Preceded by: David Turpie
- Succeeded by: Arthur Pue Gorman

Chair of the Democratic National Committee
- In office 1896–1904
- Preceded by: William F. Harrity
- Succeeded by: Thomas Taggart

United States Senator from Arkansas
- In office March 4, 1885 – March 3, 1903
- Preceded by: James D. Walker
- Succeeded by: James Paul Clarke

Member of the U.S. House of Representatives from Arkansas's 2nd district
- In office March 4, 1881 – February 19, 1885
- Preceded by: William F. Slemons
- Succeeded by: Clifton R. Breckinridge

Personal details
- Born: James Kimbrough Jones; September 29, 1839 Marshall County, Mississippi, U.S.
- Died: June 1, 1908 (aged 68) Washington, D.C., U.S.
- Resting place: Rock Creek Cemetery; Washington, D.C., U.S.
- Party: Democratic

Military service
- Allegiance: Confederate States
- Branch/service: Confederate States Army
- Rank: Private
- Unit: 3rd Arkansas Cavalry Regiment
- Battles/wars: American Civil War

James Kimbrough Jones (September 29, 1839 – June 1, 1908) was a Confederate Army veteran, plantation owner, lawyer, U.S. congressional representative, United States senator and chairman of the Democratic National Committee from Arkansas. He was a Democrat.

== Early life ==
Born in Marshall County, Mississippi, Jones moved with his father to Dallas County, Arkansas, in 1848. He pursued classical studies under a private tutor. During the American Civil War, Jones served in the Confederate Army. After the war he returned to his Arkansas plantation.

== Career ==
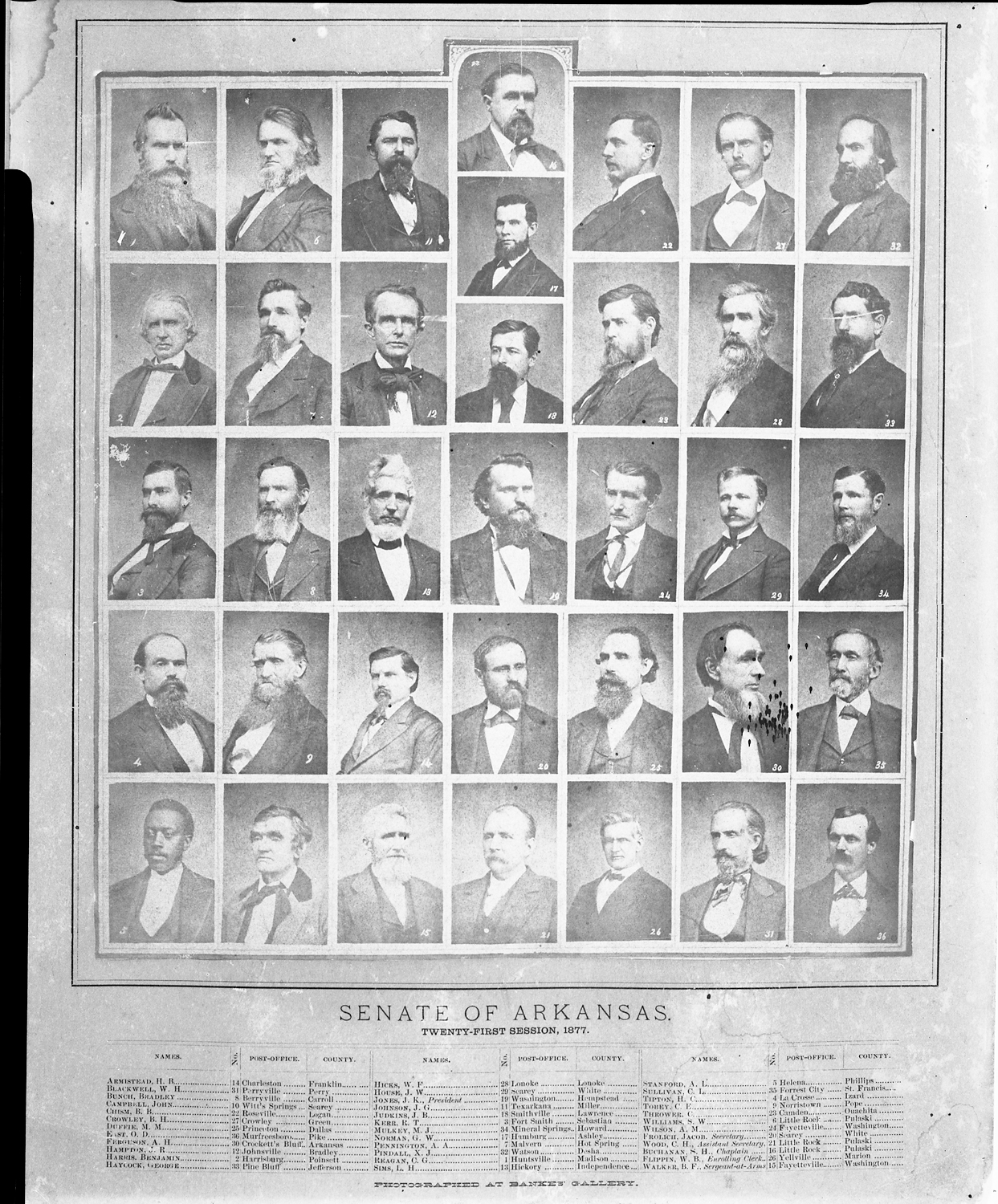
1877 Arkansas Senate composite of photographs

He studied law and in 1874 was admitted to the bar, practicing in Washington, Arkansas. From 1873 to 1879, he was a member of the Arkansas State Senate, and was President of the Arkansas Senate from 1877 to 1879. His post office was listed as in Washington, Arkansas in Hempstead County, Arkansas. In 1896 and 1900, he was the chairman of the Democratic National Committee.

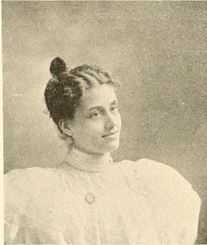
Mary Jones, daughter of James Kimbrough Jones

Jones was elected to the Forty-seventh and Forty-eighth Congresses (March 4, 1881 – March 3, 1885); he was re-elected to the Forty-ninth but tendered his resignation on February 19, 1885, having been elected to the United States Senate that year. Jones was reelected in 1891 and 1897 and served from March 4, 1885, to March 3, 1903, unsuccessfully seeking reelection in 1902. While in the Senate, he was chairman of the Committee on Indian Affairs (Fifty-third Congress), Committee on Corporations Organized in the District of Columbia (Fifty-fourth and Fifty-fifth Congresses), Committee on Private Land Claims (Fifty-fifth Congress.)

After his congressional service, Jones resumed the practice of law in Washington, D.C., where he died; he was buried in Rock Creek Cemetery.

== Sources ==
- United States Congress. "James K. Jones (id: J000231)". Biographical Directory of the United States Congress. Retrieved on March 24, 2010

U.S. House of Representatives
Preceded by William F. Slemons	Member of the U.S. House of Representatives from Arkansas's 2nd congressional district 1881–1885	Succeeded by Clifton R. Breckinridge
U.S. Senate
Preceded by James D. Walker	U.S. Senator (Class 3) from Arkansas; 1885–1903; Served alongside: Augustus Garland, James Berry	Succeeded by James Paul Clarke
Preceded by Henry L. Dawes	Chair of the Senate Indian Affairs Committee; 1893–1895	Succeeded by Richard F. Pettigrew
Preceded by Nelson W. Aldrich	Chair of the Senate District of Columbia Corporations Committee; 1895–1897	Succeeded by John W. Daniel
Preceded by Isham G. Harris	Chair of the Senate Private Land Claims Committee; 1898–1899	Succeeded by Henry M. Teller
Party political offices
Preceded by William F. Harrity	Chair of the Democratic National Committee; 1896–1904	Succeeded by Thomas Taggart
Preceded by David Turpie	Chair of the Senate Democratic Caucus; 1899–1903	Succeeded by Arthur Pue Gorman
