= Roundness (disambiguation) =

Roundness is the measure of how closely the shape of an object approaches that of a circle.

It may also refer to:

- Roundness (geology), the roundness of clastic particles
- Roundness (handwriting), the sharpness of handwriting patterns

== See also ==
- Roundedness, in speech articulation
- Round (disambiguation)
