= Cheney Stadium =

Multipurpose stadium in Tacoma, Washington

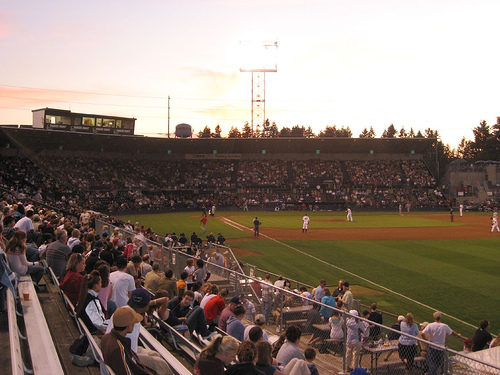

- Location within Washington State Location within the United States
- Location: 2502 South Tyler Street; Tacoma, Washington; United States
- Coordinates: 47°14′16.92″N 122°29′51.16″W
- Owner: Pierce County
- Operator: Schlegel Sports Group
- Capacity: 6,500
- Executive suites: 16
- Surface: Grass
- Field size: Left field: 325 ft (99 m); Center field: 425 ft (130 m); Right field: 325 ft (99 m)

Construction
- Groundbreaking: January 2, 1960
- Built: 1960
- Opened: April 16, 1960
- Renovated: 1992, 1998, 1999, 2011
- Cost: $940,000 ($10.2 million in 2025 dollars) $29–$30 million (renovations)
- Architects: E.L. Mills & Associates; Populous (2011 renovation)
- Structural engineers: Anderson Birkeland & Anderson
- General contractors: Earley Construction Co. Mortenson Construction (2011 renovation)

Tenants
- Tacoma Rainiers (PCL), 1960–present Tacoma Tides (ASL), 1976; Tacoma Defiance (USLC/MLS Next Pro), 2018–2022; OL Reign (NWSL), 2019–2021

Cheney Stadium is a multi-purpose stadium located in Tacoma, Washington, United States. It is primarily used for baseball and is home to the Tacoma Rainiers of the minor league Pacific Coast League. The stadium also hosted professional soccer teams, including the Tacoma Defiance of the USL Championship until 2022 and OL Reign of the National Women's Soccer League until 2021. Cheney Stadium opened in 1960 and has a capacity of 6,500 seats. It is next to Henry Foss High School, and the stadium has an agreement with the school to use the school parking lot for parking.

== History ==
Cheney Stadium is named for Ben Cheney, a local businessman who worked to bring minor league baseball to Tacoma and also was put in control of the project. Cheney Stadium was constructed in 42 working days after the San Francisco Giants committed to moving their Triple-A affiliate from Phoenix if the city could open the stadium for the beginning of the 1960 season. Construction included light towers and wooden grandstand seats from Seals Stadium in San Francisco. Several of the wooden grandstand seats are still in place.

Cheney Stadium has been home to Pacific Coast League baseball continuously since 1960, in the form of seven teams: the Tacoma Giants (1960–65), Cubs (1966–71), Twins (1972–77), Yankees (1978), Tugs (1979), Tigers (A's) (1980–94), and Rainiers (Mariners) (1995–present).

Notable players who played in Cheney Stadium include Baseball Hall of Fame inductees Juan Marichal, Gaylord Perry, Reggie Jackson, and Ken Griffey Jr., as well as Tom Kelly, Jose Canseco, Mark McGwire, Jason Giambi, Félix Hernández, Cliff Lee, and Alex Rodriguez.

The stadium hosted the baseball competition of the 1990 Goodwill Games and hosted the 30th annual Triple-A All-Star Game on July 12, 2017.

It was the Seattle Mariners' alternate training site in 2020 when the COVID-19 pandemic forced the cancellation of the Minor League Baseball campaign and abbreviation of the Major League Baseball season. The Mariners had previously considered Cheney Stadium for use during the 1994 season after the Kingdome was closed for emergency repairs.

=== 2011 renovation ===
On November 11, 2009, it was announced the City of Tacoma was considering a $30 million renovation to Cheney Stadium. Early renovation plans included a new grandstand superstructure, roof and concourse, as well as new concession stands, seats, luxury suites, and restaurant. The proposal drew little controversy from taxpayers.

On November 19, 2009, the Tacoma Rainiers renewed their lease with the City of Tacoma to keep playing at Cheney Stadium for 32 years. The deal relied on the renovation proposal getting passed. The proposal, now said to be $28 million in cost, was approved on November 25, 2009. The approval means the Rainiers will continue to play in Tacoma until at least 2041, and renovations were completed before the 2011 season. The renovations included basic repairs, 16 luxury suites, a kids' "play area", more restrooms and concession stands, and a new restaurant.

== Soccer ==
The reserve team of Seattle Sounders FC of Major League Soccer, known at the time as Seattle Sounders FC 2, played in Cheney Stadium from 2018 to 2021. The team rebranded as the Tacoma Defiance in 2019, but maintained the Sounders affiliation. The club, along with the OL Reign, then known as Reign FC, of the National Women's Soccer League originally planned to build their own soccer-specific stadium in a nearby parking lot, with assistance from the Rainiers, and had aimed to open the new stadium in 2021. After the 2021 season, Major League Baseball tightened restrictions on alternate uses of their fields and both teams found new locations. Reign moved their home matches to Lumen Field beginning with the 2022 season. The Tacoma Defiance currently play at Starfire Stadium.

The Sounders played one U.S. Open Cup match at Cheney Stadium on June 12, 2019, which ended as a 2–1 loss to the Portland Timbers. 6,280 spectators attended the match.

== Gallery ==
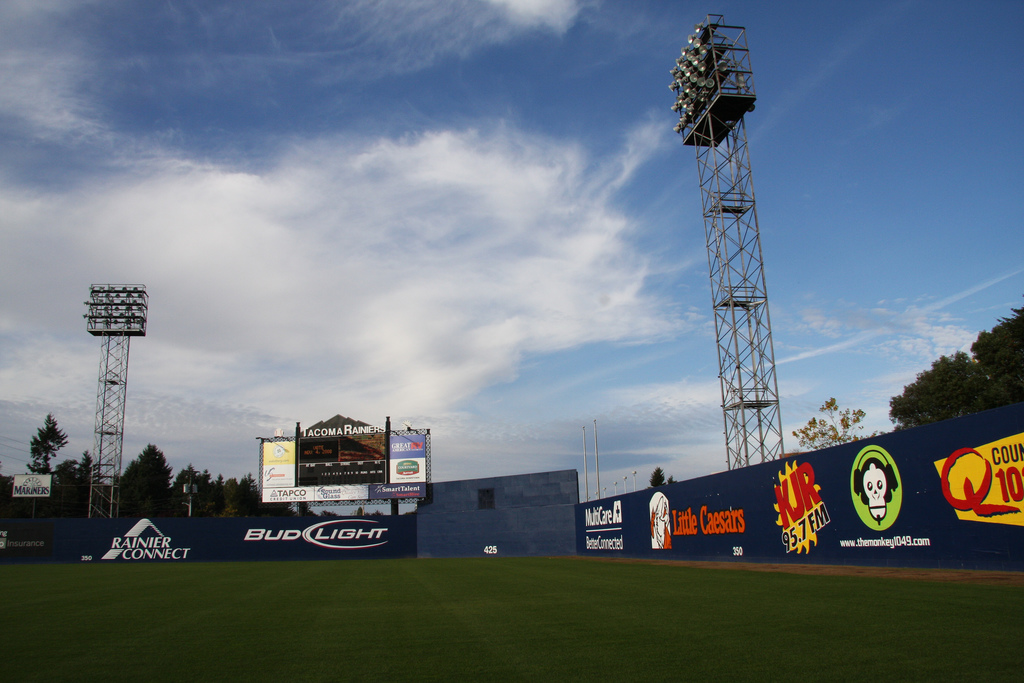
Outfield and scoreboard
