= Round and Around =

Round and Around may refer to:

- "Round and Around" (Jaki Graham song), 1985
- "Round and Around" (Pink Floyd song), 1987
- "Round and Around", a song by Simian from Chemistry Is What We Are
- "Round and Around" (Magnum, P.I.), an episode of Magnum, P.I.
- "Round and Around", a song by Jo Yuri from EP Op.22 Y-Waltz: in Major

== See also ==
- "Around and Around", a 1958 song by Chuck Berry
- Round and Round (disambiguation)
