= Around =

Around may refer to:

- "Around", a song by Julia van Bergen submitted in the Netherlands in the Junior Eurovision Song Contest 2014
- Around, 2006 album by Tom Verlaine
- Around, 2013 EP by Whirr
- Around, 2006 Palestinian film

== See also ==
- Round (disambiguation)
