= William F. Harrity =

American politician

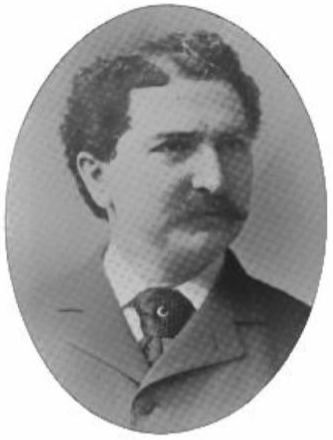

Chair of the Democratic National Committee
- In office 1892–1896
- Preceded by: Calvin Brice
- Succeeded by: James Jones

Personal details
- Born: William Francis Harrity; October 19, 1850; Wilmington, Delaware, U.S.
- Died: April 17, 1912 (aged 61); Philadelphia, Philadelphia, U.S.
- Political party: Democratic
- Education: St. Mary's College, Delaware (BA); La Salle University (MA, LLB)

William Francis Harrity (October 19, 1850 – April 17, 1912) was an American politician and lawyer. Harrity is best known as chairperson of the Democratic National Committee from 1892 to 1896. He also served as Secretary of the Commonwealth of Pennsylvania between 1891 through 1895.

== Early life and career ==
William Francis Harrity was born in Wilmington, Delaware, the son of Michael and Jane A. Harrity, natives of County Donegal, Ireland. He began his education in public schools—graduating from Clarkson Taylor's academy and St. Mary's College. In 1870, Harrity graduated at the top of his class at La Salle College in Philadelphia, Pennsylvania earning a law degree. He completed one year as a tutor of Latin and mathematics at La Salle while gaining his master of arts degree. On December 27, 1873, Harrity completed the bar exam and worked as a lawyer for others and himself until 1884.

== Political career ==
By 1882, Harrity had established himself and his law practice at 608 Chestnut St. in the Philadelphia community.and became the chairman of the City of Philadelphia's Democratic Party executive committee. His leadership attributed to the many Democratic candidates being elected at the local and state level including Robert E. Pattison as Pennsylvania Governor in 1883. His success led to an appointment a Pennsylvania delegate to the Democratic National Convention in 1884 and as Postmaster General for Philadelphia between 1885 and 1889 before he retired his post to become chief executive, and president of the Equitable Trust Company, 624 Chestnut Street, Philadelphia.

In 1891, Robert E. Pattison won a second term as Pennsylvania Governor, a position he lost in 1887. Upon reelection, Pattison appointed Harrity as his Secretary of State (or Secretary of the Commonwealth Capita of Pennsylvania). In 1896, Harrity once again served as a delegate from Pennsylvania to Democratic National Convention.

== Personal life ==
Harrity was married with four children.

He died at his home in Overbrook, Philadelphia on April 17, 1912.

== Honors ==
- The William F. Harrity School, a public elementary school in Philadelphia, is named in his honor.
- In 1891, James M. Beck entered the law office and formed a partnership with William F. Harrity; Beck would later become the United States Solicitor General.

Party political offices
Preceded by Calvin Brice	Chair of the Democratic National Committee; 1892–1896	Succeeded by James Jones
