= Round Hill =

Round Hill may refer to several places:

== Antarctica ==
- Round Hill (Heard Island)

== Australia ==
- Round Hill, Queensland, a locality in the Gladstone Region
- Round Hill, Tasmania, a locality in Australia

== Canada ==
- Round Hill, Alberta
- Rural Municipality of Round Hill No. 467, Saskatchewan
- Round Hill, Nova Scotia

== Jamaica ==
- Round Hill Hotel and Villas, a resort in Hopewell, Jamaica

== New Zealand ==
- Round Hill, near Pahia, Southland
- Roundhill Ski Area, Canterbury

== Solomon Islands ==
- Round Hill, Arundel Island

== United Kingdom ==
- Round Hill, London, a small approach to the main flank of the Norwood Ridge
- Round Hill, North Pennines, a Nuttall mountain in England
- Round Hill, North Yorkshire, a 454 m hill on the North York Moors
- Round Hill, Oxfordshire, part of Wittenham Clumps
- Round Hill, Brighton, an area of Brighton
- Roundhill, County Tyrone, a townland in County Tyrone, Northern Ireland

== United States ==
- Round Hill, Connecticut
- Round Hill, Kentucky
- Round Hill, Massachusetts
- Round Hill (Greene County, New York), a mountain in the Catskills
- Round Hill (Mount Vernon, Ohio), on the National Register of Historic Places
- Round Hill, Frederick County, Virginia
- Round Hill, Loudoun County, Virginia (incorporated)
- Round Hill, Rappahannock County, Virginia
- Round Hill School a short-lived experimental school in Northampton, Massachusetts, founded in 1823.
