= Frank Day (artist) =

Native American painter from California (1902–1976)

- Ly-dam-lilly
- Born: February 24, 1902; Berry Creek, California
- Died: August 13, 1976 (aged 74); Sacramento, California
- Citizenship: Bald Rock Konkow Maidu and American
- Education: self-taught
- Known for: painting

Frank Day, also Ly-dam-lilly (February 24, 1902 – August 13, 1976) was a Native American artist from California.

== Early life ==
Frank Day was born on February 24, 1902, in Berry Creek, California. His grandfather was Big Bill Day and his father was Twoboe. His father was a leader in the Bald Rock Konkow Maidu. Growing up, he attended Berry Creek Public Schools, then Greenville Indian School, and Bacone College in Muscogee, Oklahoma. He primarily lived in Sacramento, California. After his father died in 1922, Day "became something of a vagabond."

== Art career ==
Frank Day worked a range of jobs, including day laborer, sign painter, preacher, ranch hand, singer, cultural historian, linguist, author, and lecturer. After a serious car accident in 1960, he became a full-time painter as he recovered. Anthropologist Donald P. Jewell encouraged Day to paint imagery from Maidu traditional narratives.

Frank Day primarily painted in oils. His work is in such public collections as the Bureau of Indian Affairs; California State University, Sacramento; the Indian Arts and Crafts Board; and University of California, Davis.

== Death and legacy ==
Day died August 13, 1976, in Sacramento, California.

In 1999, a retrospective of his art was exhibited at the National Museum of the American Indian, George Gustav Heye Center, New York; the Museum of Indian Arts and Culture, Laboratory of Anthropology in Santa Fe; and the Heard Museum in Phoenix. The California Indian Days Art Exhibit created the Frank Day Memorial Award in his honor.

== See also ==
- Bald Rock Dome
- Konkow language
- Maidu
