= Round and Round =

Round and Round may refer to:

- "Round and Round" (Shapiro/Stallman song), 1957
- "Round and Round" (Ratt song), 1984
- "Round and Round" (Spandau Ballet song), 1984
- "Round and Round" (Tevin Campbell song), 1990
- "Round and Round" (Ariel Pink's Haunted Graffiti song), 2010
- "Round and Round" (Imagine Dragons song), 2012
- "Round and Round" (Tinkara Kovač song), 2014
- "Round & Round" (New Order song), 1989
- "Round & Round" (Twinz song), 1995
- "Round & Round" (Selena Gomez & the Scene song), 2010
- "'Round and 'Round (Merry Go 'Round of Love)", a 1988 song by Guy
- "Round and Round", a 1960 song written by Tom Jones and Harvey Schmidt
- "Round and Round", a 1974 song by The Strawbs from the album Hero and Heroine
- "Round and Round", a 1975 song by Aerosmith from the album Toys in the Attic
- "Round and Round", a 1982 song by Lionel Richie from the album Lionel Richie
- "Round and Round", a 1986 song by Died Pretty from the 1986 album Free Dirt
- "Round and Round", a 1988 song by Frozen Ghost from the album Nice Place to Visit
- "Round and Round", a 1991 song by Kim Hill from the album Brave Heart
- "Round and Round", a 1997 song by Mary J. Blige from the album Share My World
- "Round and Round", a 1997 song by Earth, Wind & Fire from the album In the Name of Love
- "Round and Round", a 1997 song by LSG from the album Levert.Sweat.Gill
- "Round and Round", a 1999 song by Atmosphere from the album Headshots: Se7en
- "Round and Round", a 1999 song by Status Quo from the album Under the Influence
- "Round and Round", a 1999 song by Dave Hollister from the album Ghetto Hymns
- "Round and Round", a 2003 song by Haystak from the album Return of the Mak Million
- "Round and Round", a 2003 song by Nate Dogg from the album Nate Dogg
- "Round and Round", a 2004 song by Fabolous from the album Real Talk
- "Round and Round", a 2005 song by BodyRockers from the album BodyRockers
- "Round and Round", a 2005 song by Amiel from the album These Ties
- "Round and Round", a 2006 song by Nathan from the album Masterpiece
- "Round and Round", a 2007 song by Jagged Edge from the album Baby Makin' Project
- "Round and Round", a 2010 song by Kenny Chesney from the album Hemingway's Whiskey
- "Round and Round", a 2011 song by 3 Doors Down from the album Time of My Life
- "Round and Round (Bingeul Bingeul)", a 2010 song by U-KISS from the album Only One
- "Round & Round", a 1972 song by the Delfonics from the album Tell Me This Is a Dream
- "Round & Round", a 1972 song by Edgar Winter from the album They Only Come Out at Night
- "Round & Round", a 1977 song by Gryphon from the album Treason
- "Round & Round", a 1996 song by 702 from the album No Doubt
- "Round & Round", a 1998 song by Bonnie Raitt from the album Fundamental
- "Round & Round", a 2000 song by Kottonmouth Kings from the album High Society
- "Round & Round", a 2001 song by Hi-Tek from the album Hi-Teknology
- "Round & Round", a 2002 song by All-4-One from the album A41
- "Round & Round", a 2002 song by Los Lobos from the album Good Morning Aztlán
- "Round & Round", a 2006 song by Toby Lightman from the album Bird on a Wire
- "Round & Round", a 2008 song by US5 from the album Around The World
- "Round & Round", a 2015 song by Sisqó from the album Last Dragon
- "Round & Round", a 2020 song by Trey Songz from the album Back Home
- "Round & Round (It Won't Be Long)", a 1969 song by Neil Young from the album Everybody Knows This Is Nowhere

== See also ==
- Round and Around (disambiguation)
- "Round Round", a song by Sugababes
- "Around and Around", a song by Chuck Berry, recorded by David Bowie as "Round and Round"
- "You Spin Me Round (Like a Record)", a song by Dead or Alive
- Rownd a Rownd ("Round and Round"), Welsh soap opera
