= New Denmark =

New Denmark may refer to:

- New Denmark, New Brunswick, Canada
- New Denmark, Wisconsin, United States
- a literal translation of Latin Nova Dania, a failed Danish colonization attempt by Jens Munk near the mouth of the Churchill River in Canada
- Name for the danish Andaman and Nicobar Islands, later changed to Frederic’s islands
- Proposed Danish acquisition of California, a satirical renaming proposal of Denmark wanting to buy California 2025

== See also ==
- New Denmark (Nye Danmark), a Danish World War II pro-Nazi political party founded by Max Johannes Arildskov
