= Round Mountain (California) =

Round Mountain Volcano - California

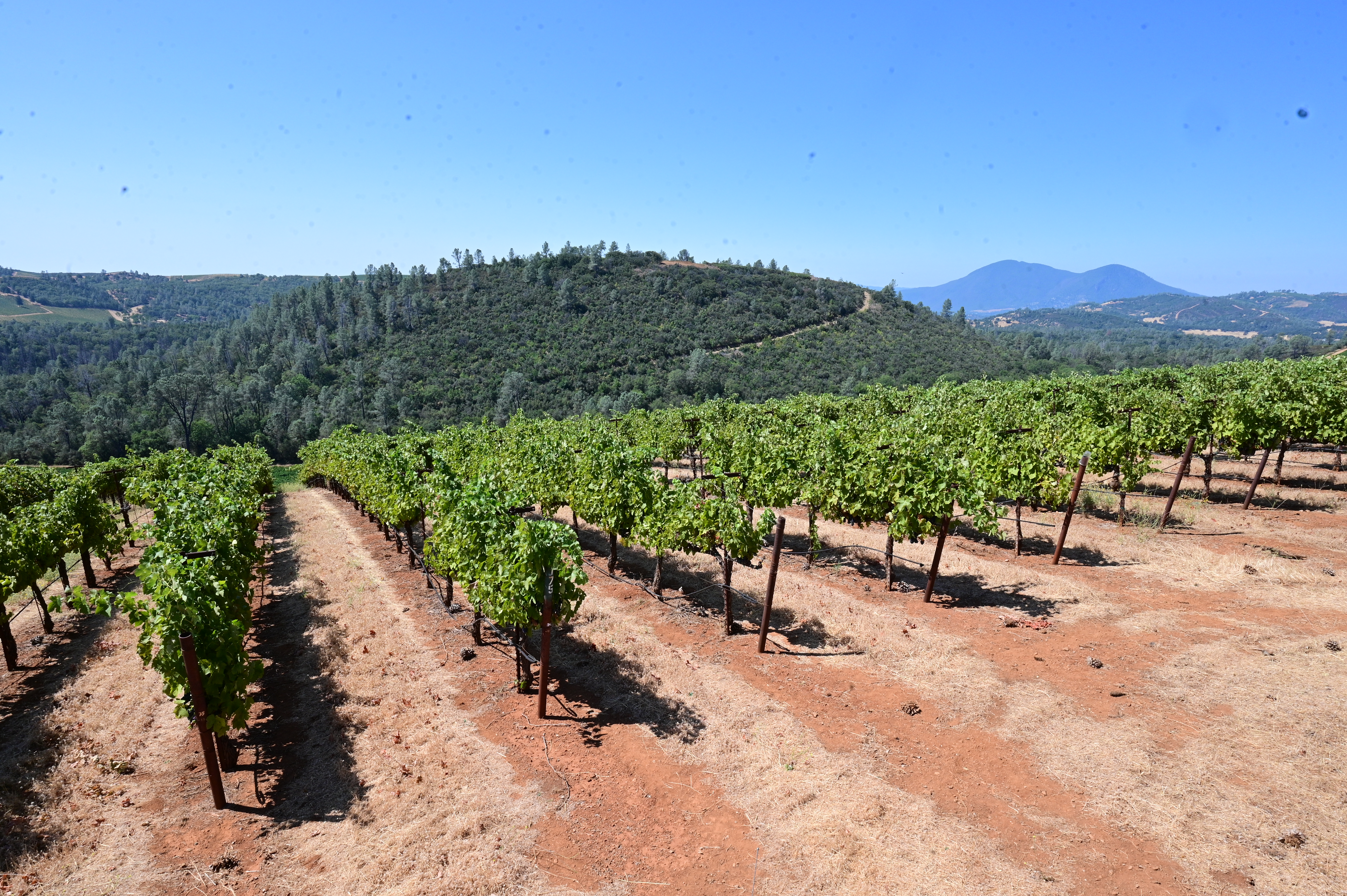

Highest point
- Elevation: 2,294 ft (699 m)
- Coordinates: 39.048955°N 122.636205°W

Geography
- Location: Lake County, Clearlake Oaks, California, USA

Geology
- Mountain type: Dormant cinder cone
- Volcanic field: Clear Lake Volcanic Field
- Last eruption: 8,500–10,000 years ago

Round Mountain is a dormant volcanic cinder cone located in the Clear Lake Volcanic Field in the eastern end of the High Valley. It last erupted approximately 8,500–10,000 years ago and filled the valley with volcanic debris, raising the valley level to 400 feet above Clear Lake.

The Clear Lake Volcanic Field is the site of Late Pliocene to early Holocene activity and consists of lava domes, cinder cones, and maars with eruptive products varying from basalt to rhyolite. The site's threat level is ranked "High" at #33 in the top volcanic threats in the United States in 2018 Update to the United States Geological Survey National Volcanic Threat Assessment. Cobb Mountain and Mount Konocti are the two highest peaks in the volcanic field, at 4,724 ft (1,440 m) and 4,285 ft (1,306 m) respectively.

== Geography ==
The Geologic History of the surrounding area including the volcano (which is covered with heavy concentrations of chaparral, oak, Pacific madrone, manzanita, western white pine and other plant species of the California coastal mountains) has been studied and documented by the USGS and prominent geologists as far back as 1938. At an approximate elevation of 2,294 ft (699 m) the volcano exhibits a distinctive sunken concave of a cinder cone volcano.

== History ==
The volcano is credited with the creation of the High Valley through repeated eruptions the last of which is thought to have occurred 8,500–10,000 years ago. The result was an elevated valley at approximately 1,600 ft (490 m) in elevation with distinct ridgelines reaching up to 3,000 ft (910 m).
