= Denmark (name) =

Denmark is a surname and a masculine given name. Notable people with the name are as follows:

== Surname ==
- Annie Dove Denmark (1887–1974), American music educator
- Erik Denmark (born c. 1980), American competitive eater
- Leila Denmark (1898–2012), American pediatrician
- Robert Denmark (born 1968), British middle- and long-distance runner
- Scott E. Denmark, American organic chemist
- Stephen Denmark (born 1996), American football player

== Given name ==
- Denmark Vesey (c. 1767–1822), North American slave (later freedman) and instigator of a slave revolt
- Denmark Vessey (born 1984), American rapper and record producer
