= Rounds (surname) =

The surname Rounds may refer to:

- David Rounds (1930–1983), American actor
- Lil Rounds (born 1984), American singer
- Mike Rounds (born 1954), American politician from South Dakota
- Luke Rounds (born 1991), Australian footballer (Australian rules football)
- Tom Rounds (1936–2014), American radio broadcasting executive

== See also ==
- Round (surname)
