= Maidu traditional narratives =

Maidu traditional narratives include myths, legends, tales, and oral histories preserved by the Maidu, Konkow, and Nisenan people of eastern Sacramento Valley and foothills in northeastern California.

Maidu oral literature aligned the Maidu closely with their central California neighbors, such as the Wintu and Valley and Sierra Miwok, but also showed influences from the Great Basin Northern Paiute and Washoe to the east. (See also Traditional narratives (Native California).)

== On-line examples of Maidu narratives ==
- "The California Indians" by Stephen Powers (1874)
- Dawn of the World by C. Hart Merriam (1910)
- "Maidu Texts" by Roland B. Dixon
- The North American Indian by Edward S. Curtis (1924)
- Myths and Legends of California and the Old Southwest by Katharine Berry Judson

== Sources for Maidu narratives ==
- Azbill, Henry. 1969. "World Maker". Indian Historian 2(1):20. (Myth including Earth Diver episode.)
- Azbill, Henry. 1969. "How Death Came to the People". Indian Historian 2(2):13-14. (Myth remembered from the narrator's grandmother.)
- Curtis, Edward S. 1907-1930. The North American Indian. 20 vols. Plimpton Press, Norwood, Massachusetts. (Two myths collected from Jack Franco, vol. 14, pp. 173-176.)
- Dixon, Roland B. 1900. "Some Coyote Stories from the Maidu Indians of California". Journal of American Folklore 13:267-270. (Four narratives.)
- Dixon, Roland B. 1903. "System and Sequence in Maidu Mythology". Journal of American Folklore 16:32-36. (Analysis.)
- Dixon, Roland B. 1912. Maidu Texts. American Ethnological Society Publications 4:1-241. (Myths and tales collected from Tom Young (Hanc'ibyjim) in 1902-1903.)
- Erdoes, Richard, and Alfonso Ortiz. 1984. American Indian Myths and Legends. Pantheon Books, New York. (Retelling of a narrative from Dixon 1904, pp. 290-291.)
- Gifford, Edward Winslow, and Gwendoline Harris Block. 1930. California Indian Nights. Arthur H. Clark, Glendale, California. (Four previously published narratives, pp. 85-91, 136-139, 158-161, 180-181, 198, 240-251, 273-274, 280-283.)
- Judson, Katharine Berry. 1912. Myths and Legends of California and the Old Southwest. A. C. McClurg, Chicago. (Three myths, including Orpheus, pp. 50, 54, 70-71.)
- Kroeber, Alfred L. 1929. "The Valley Nisenan". University of California Publications in American Archaeology and Ethnology 24:253-290. Berkeley. (Myths obtained from Tom Cleanso in 1929.)
- Kroeber, Theodora. 1959. The Inland Whale. University of California Press, Berkeley. (Retelling of a traditional narrative with commentary, pp. 69-73, 175-178.)
- Loeb, Edwin M. 1933. "The Eastern Kuksu Cult". University of California Publications in American Archaeology and Ethnology 33:139-232. Berkeley. (Notes on mythology, pp. 157-159, 179, 191, 197, 203-206.)
- Luthin, Herbert W. 2002. Surviving through the Days: A California Indian Reader. University of California Press, Berkeley. (Retranslation of a myth previously published in Dixon 1912, pp. 248-259.)
- Margolin, Malcolm. 1993. The Way We Lived: California Indian Stories, Songs, and Reminiscences. First edition 1981. Heyday Books, Berkeley, California. (Five myths, pp. 38-40, 89-90, 125-126, 148-154, from Dixon 1902, 1912.)
- Merriam, C. Hart. 1910. The Dawn of the World: Myths and Weird Tales Told by the Mewan Indians of California. Arthur H. Clark, Cleveland, Ohio. Reprinted as The Dawn of the World: Myths and Tales of the Miwok Indians of California, in 1993 with an introduction by Lowell J. Bean, University of Nebraska Press, Lincoln. (Several narratives.)
- Powers, Stephen. 1877. Tribes of California. Contributions to North American Ethnology, vol. 3. Government Printing Office, Washington, D.C. Reprinted with an introduction by Robert F. Heizer in 1976, University of California Press, Berkeley. (Maiduan narratives, pp. 287, 290-305, 339-345.)
- Shipley, William. 1963. Maidu Texts and Dictionary. University of California Publications in Linguistics No. 33. Berkeley. (Narratives collected in 1956-1959.)
- Shipley, William. 1991. The Maidu Indian Myths and Stories of Hanc'ibyjim. Heyday Books, Berkeley, California. (New translations of narratives originally published by Dixon in 1912.)
- Spencer, D. L. 1908. "Notes on the Maidu Indians of Butte County, California". Journal of American Folklore 21:242-245. (Includes one narrative.)
- Swann, Brian. 1994. Coming to Light: Contemporary Translations of the Native Literatures of North America. Random House, New York. ("Coyote the Spoiler" and "The Sister Who Married the Stars," recorded by Roland Dixon in 1902-1903, pp. 749-763.)
- Thompson, Stith. 1929. Tales of the North American Indians. Harvard University Press, Cambridge, Massachusetts. (Creation and Theft of Fire myths, pp. 24-30, 40-42, from Dixon 1905.)
- Uldall, Hans Jorgen, and William Shipley. 1966. Nisenan Texts and Dictionary. University of California Publications in Linguistics No. 46. Berkeley. (Narratives collected by Uldall in 1930-1932.)
