= Kuksu (religion) =

Indigenous religion of Northern California

- Map of California showing hypotheses on the distribution of the Kuksu religion
- Divisions: Northern Kuksu, Southern Kuksu
- Region: Northern California

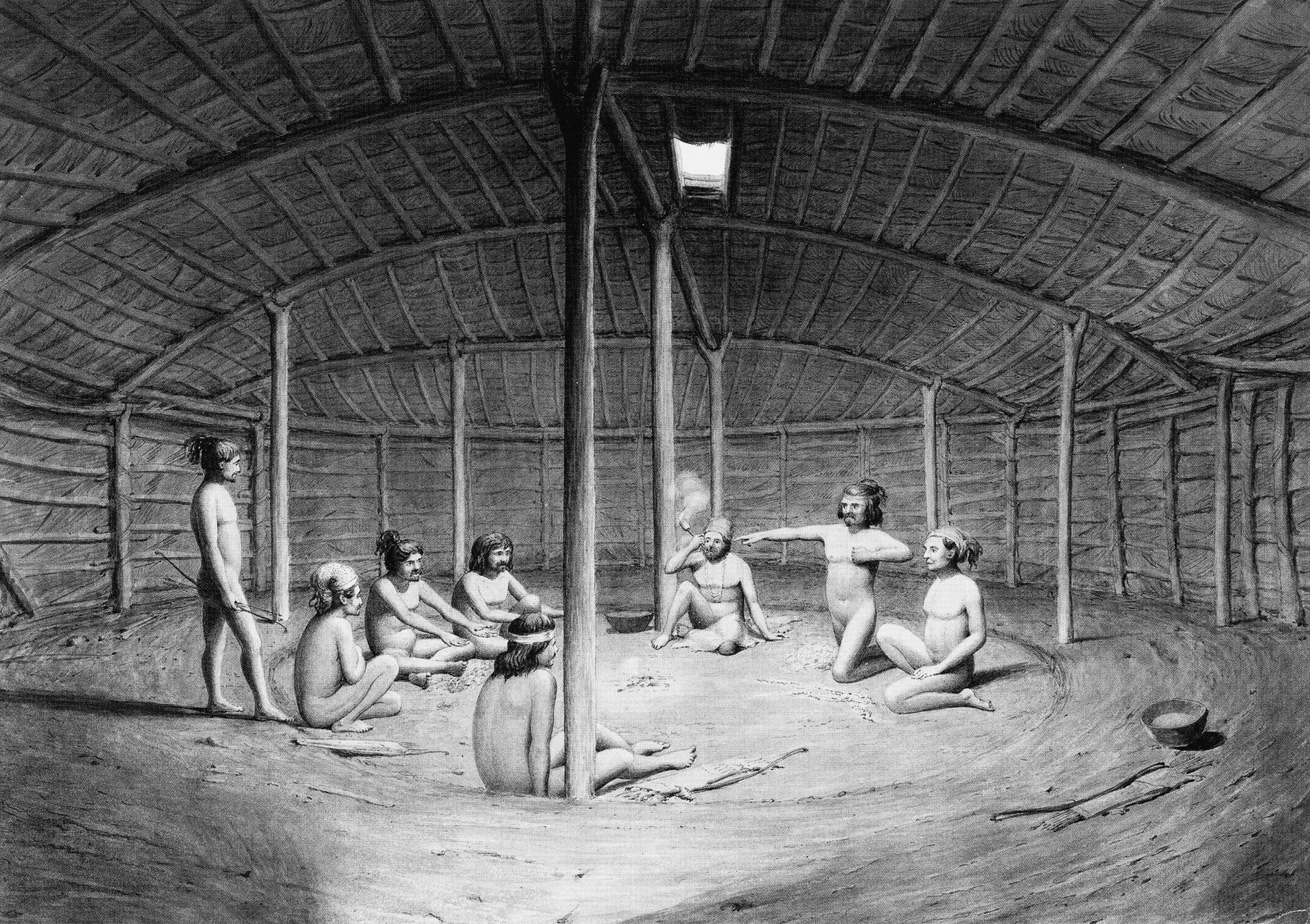
Konkow Kuksu ceremony

Kuksu was a religion in Northern California practiced by members within several Indigenous peoples of California before and during contact with the arriving European settlers. The religious belief system was held by several tribes in Central California and Northern California, from the Sacramento Valley west to the Pacific Ocean.

The practice of Kuksu religion included elaborate narrative ceremonial dances and specific regalia. The men of the tribe practiced rituals to ensure good health, bountiful harvests, hunts, fertility, and good weather. Ceremonies included an annual mourning ceremony, rites of passage, and intervention with the spirit world. A male secret society met in underground dance rooms and danced in disguises at the public dances.

Among the Patwin and Maidu, Hesi developed as a subdivision of Kuksu distinguished by its female participation.

Kuksu has been identified archaeologically by the discovery of underground dance rooms and wooden dance drums.

== Northern Kuksu religion ==
=== Patwin ===
The Patwin culture of Northern California had comparatively strong and noticeable Kuksu systems and rituals.

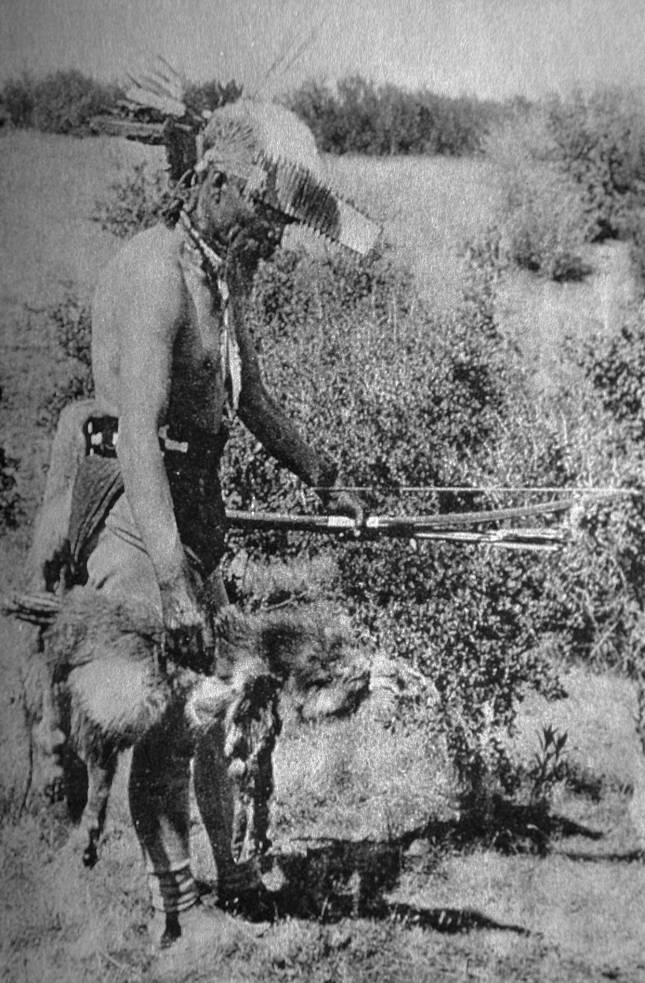
Maidu Kuksu dancer

=== Maidu ===
The Maidu culture of Northern California had comparatively strong and noticeable Kuksu systems and rituals.

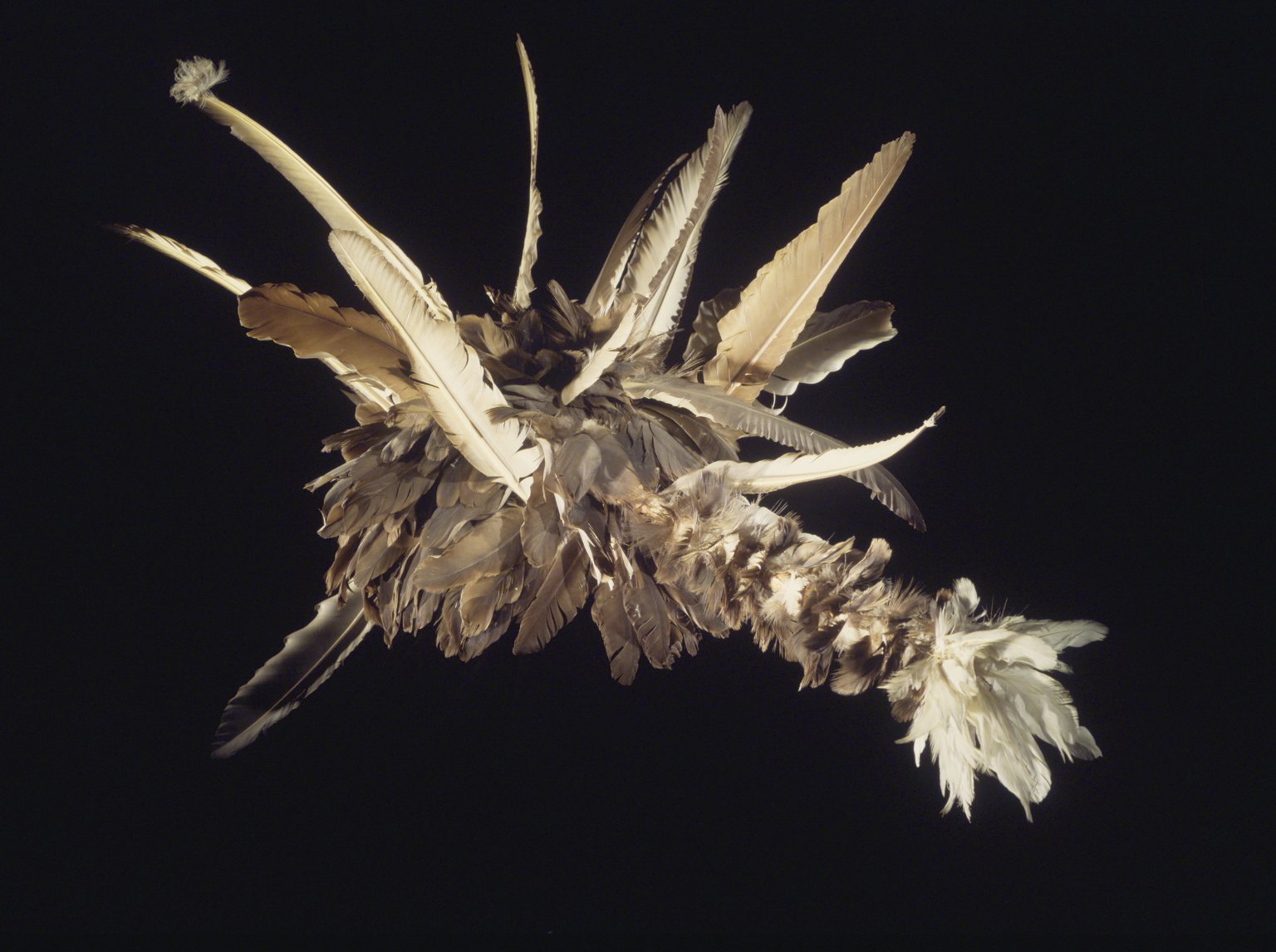
Pomo headdress used in Kuksu ceremonies

=== Pomo ===
Kuksu was personified as a spirit being by the Pomo people. Their mythology and dance ceremonies were witnessed, including the spirit of Kuksu or Guksu, between 1892 and 1904. The Pomo used the name Kuksu or Guksu, depending on the dialect, as the name for a red-beaked supernatural being, that lived in a sweathouse at the southern end of the world. Healing was his province and specialty. The person who played the Kuksu/Guksu in Pomo dance ceremonies was often considered the medicine man, and dressed as him when attending the sick. A ceremony dance was named after him. He also appeared in costume at most ceremonies briefly in order to take away the villager's illnesses.

All males were expected to join a ceremonial society; some of their dances were private or secret from women and children. Scholars differ in their opinions of the societies' power in the tribe: "There was no secret society of importance as there was among the Maidu and presumedly among the neighboring Wintun, and no organized priesthood vested with control over ceremonies." In contrast, in 1925 a witness of the Clear Lake Pomo said: "The heart of religious activities lay in a secret society called kuhma, akin to that of the Patwin and Maidu and composed chiefly of men, which managed the ritual of the ancient kuksu religion.

== Southern Kuksu religion ==
The ethnohistorian Alfred L. Kroeber observed that Kuksu existed, but had less "specialized cosmogony," in the "southern Kuksu-dancing groups" of the Ohlone/Costanoan, Salinan, Miwok and Esselen and northernmost Yokuts, in comparison to the groups in the Northern California and northern Sacramento Valley.

== See also ==
- Native Americans in California
- Traditional narratives (Native California)
