= Round Valley, Plumas County, California =

Round Valley
- Former settlement
- Location in California
- Coordinates: 40°06′57″N 120°58′04″W
- Country: United States
- State: California
- County: Plumas
- Elevation: 4,521 ft (1,378 m)

Round Valley is a former settlement in Plumas County, California, United States, at an elevation of 4521 feet (1378 m). Round Valley is located northwest of the Round Valley Reservoir, 3 miles (4.8 km) south of Greenville, and 3.5 miles (5.6 km) west-northwest of Crescent Mills.

The Round Valley post office opened in 1863, closed for a time in 1870, and closed finally in 1873.
