= Round (surname) =

The surname Round may refer to:

- Barry Round (1950–2022), Australian footballer (Australian rules football)
- Carina Round (born 1979), British singer-songwriter
- Charles Gray Round (1797–1867), British politician
- David Round (born 1978), Australian footballer (Australian rules football)
- Derek Round (1935–2012), New Zealand journalist
- Gerry Round (1939–1969), English rugby league footballer
- H. J. Round (1881–1966), English engineer
- J. Horace Round (1854–1928), English genealogist and historian
- Jack Round (1903–1936), English footballer (association football)
- James Round (1842–1916), English cricketer and politician
- Jeffrey Round, Canadian writer, director and composer
- Nathan Round (born 1980), English cricketer
- Paul Round (rugby league) (born 1963), British rugby league footballer
- Steve Round (born 1970), English football player and coach (association football)
- Thomas Round (1915–2016), English opera singer and actor

== See also ==
- Rounds (surname)
