= Denmark Township =

Denmark Township may refer to the following places in the United States:

- Denmark Township, Lee County, Iowa
- Denmark Township, Michigan
- Denmark Township, Minnesota
- Denmark Township, Ohio
