= Round Mountain (Essex County, New York) =

Mountain in New York, United States

- Location within New York Location within the United States

Highest point
- Elevation: 3,117 feet (950 m)
- Coordinates: 44°07′54″N 73°45′05″W

Geography
- Location: SE of St. Huberts, New York, U.S.
- Topo map: USGS Keene Valley

Round Mountain is a summit located in the North Country region of New York located in the Town of Keene in Essex County, southeast of St. Huberts. It is known for views and steep climb.
