= Denmark, Ohio =

Unincorporated community in Ohio, U.S.

Coordinates: 40°35′12″N 82°55′05″W

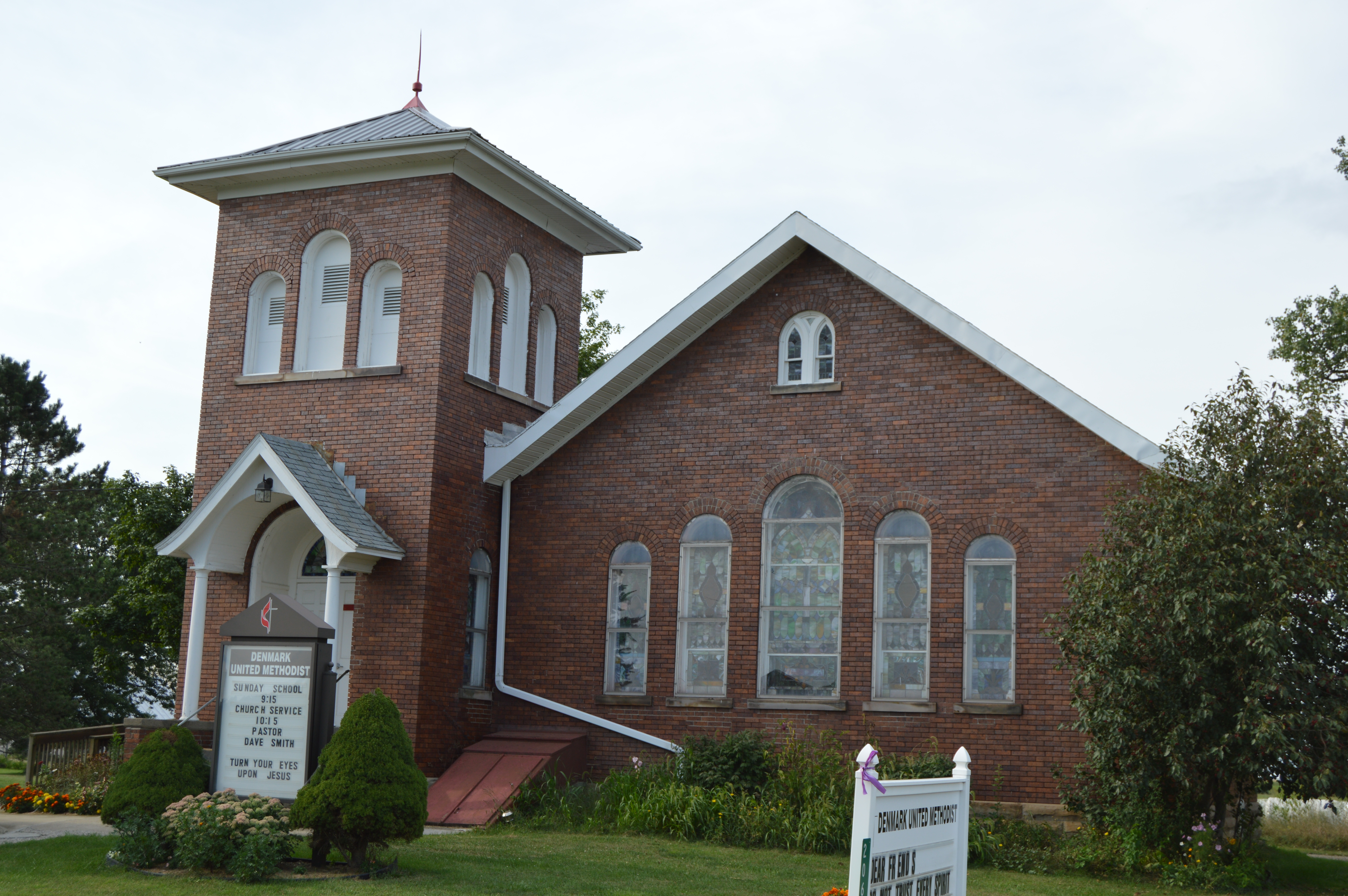
Denmark United Methodist Church

Denmark is an unincorporated community in Morrow County, in the U.S. state of Ohio.

== History ==
Denmark once had a post office called Merritt, named for the Merritt family who were the first settlers there. A post office was established under the name Marits in 1833, and remained in operation until 1907. Besides the post office, Denmark once contained a church and country store.
