= HDMS Danmark =

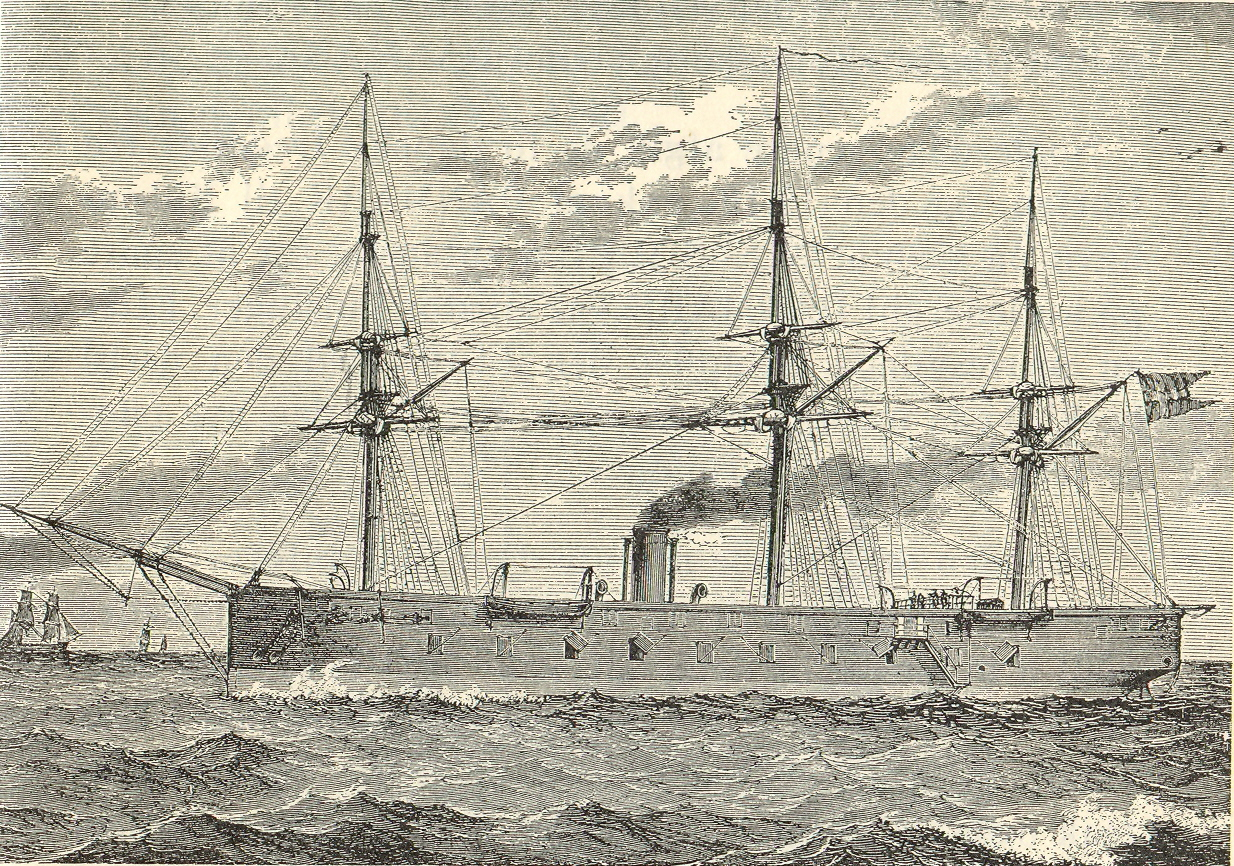
- KMD Danmark

History

Denmark
- Name: Danmark
- Namesake: Denmark
- Ordered: 1 July 1862
- Builder: J. & G. Thompson, Clydebank
- Laid down: 1862
- Launched: 23 February 1864
- Commissioned: 1869
- Decommissioned: 22 November 1900
- Fate: Scrapped 1907

General characteristics
- Type: Broadside ironclad
- Displacement: 4,770 tonnes (4,690 long tons)
- Length: 82.29 m (270 ft 0 in)
- Beam: 15.24 m (50 ft 0 in)
- Draft: 5.94 m (19 ft 6 in)
- Installed power: 1,000 ihp (750 kW)
- Propulsion: 1 shaft, 1 steam engine, 4 boilers
- Sail plan: Ship-rigged
- Speed: 8 knots (15 km/h; 9.2 mph)
- Complement: 530
- Armament: as designed: 20 guns. Danish service: see text.
- Armour: Belt: 89–114 mm (3.5–4.5 in); Battery: 89–114 mm (3.5–4.5 in)

Danmark was an armored frigate of the Royal Danish Navy originally ordered by the Confederate States Navy.

The origins of the Danmark lie in efforts of the Confederate States of America to purchase warships in Europe, which is to say in the United Kingdom and France, during the American Civil War. These efforts were led by James Dunwoody Bulloch, but the Danmark was ordered by another Confederate agent, Lieutenant (later Commander) James H. North.

North was sent to Europe by Confederate Navy secretary Stephen Mallory with the aim of buying a completed sea-going ironclad warship, the French Navy's Gloire, and ordering a similar vessel on Confederate account. The French government refused to sell Gloire, or to allow a sister ship to be built in French shipyards.

North proceeded to Britain, where the Whig government had adopted a laissez-faire attitude to American arms-buying. Here he met with George Thomson, co-owner of the Clydebank shipbuilders J. & G. Thompson. North signed a contract with Thomson's on 21 May 1862 for an armoured frigate of some 3,000 tons and 80 metres in length, for a contract price of 190,000 pounds sterling—around two million Confederate dollars at the prevailing rate of exchange—paying a deposit of 18,000 pounds. Thomson's contracted to the deliver the ship by 1 June 1863.

Known to the Confederates as "North's ship", or as "Number 61", she was Santa Maria to her builders. As finally completed, she displaced 4,750 tons, a slab-sided three-masted barque. Under steam, she would make 8 knots (15 km/h; 9.2 mph).

By the summer of 1863, the Confederate agents in Europe were seeking to sell off North's ship, offering her to the Imperial Russian Navy. The ship was clearly unsuited to Confederate needs, being too large and requiring too large a crew for their limited resources, and her draft of 6 metres was too deep for operations in the shoal waters on the Confederate coasts. Thompson's too were concerned that they would not be allowed to deliver the ship to the Confederates in the changed political climate and cancelled the contract in late 1863.

Work continued slowly on the ship, which was launched on 23 February 1864. The outbreak of the Second War of Schleswig led the Royal Danish Navy to purchase the ship, but delays in fitting out and working up meant that she was not ready for service before the end of the war.

The Danmark undertook only one active commission, from June to October 1869. At sea with her armament aboard she rolled violently, and the coal consumption of her engines was extremely high. As a result, she remained in reserve thereafter, becoming a barracks ship in 1893 before being eventually scrapped in 1907.

As commissioned into Danish service, she was armed with 20 60-pounder (8-inch) smoothbore muzzle-loading guns of 88 hundredweight and 8 18-pounder rifled muzzle-loading guns of 40 hundredweight. In 1865 this was changed to an all-rifled muzzle-loading armament of 12 60-pounder guns and 10 24-pounder guns. Two more 24-pounder guns were added in 1867.
