= Denmark Wash =

Valley in Utah, United States

Coordinates: 38°57′19″N 111°53′13″W

Denmark Wash is a stream and a canyon in eastern Millard County and north-central Sevier County, Utah, United States.

== Description ==
The wash rises in the foothills on the south end of the Round Valley in eastern Millard County and then runs east to the Millard‑Sevier county line. It then continues alongside U.S. Route 50 as it runs east‑southeast along the southern edge of the Valley Mountains before emptying into the Sevier River in southwestern Sevier Valley.

A large share of the early settlers being natives of Scandinavia caused the name to be selected.

== See also ==
- Arroyo (creek)
- List of canyons and gorges in Utah
- List of rivers in Utah
