= Round Hill, Rappahannock County, Virginia =

Unincorporated community in Virginia, US

Coordinates: 38°33′35″N 78°09′29″W

Round Hill, Rappahannock County is an unincorporated community in Rappahannock County, in the U.S. state of Virginia.
