= Pondosa, California =

Unincorporated community in California, United States

- Unincorporated community
- Location within California Location within the United States
- Coordinates: 41°11′58″N 121°41′20″W
- Country: United States
- State: California
- County: Siskiyou
- Elevation: 4,140 ft (1,260 m)
- Time zone: UTC-8 (Pacific (PST))
  - Summer (DST): UTC-7 (PDT)
- Area code: 530
- GNIS feature ID: 264928

Pondosa is an unincorporated community in Siskiyou County, California, United States. Pondosa is 33.5 miles (53.9 km) east-southeast of Mount Shasta, and is located along a former branch line of the McCloud Railway. A post office opened in Pondosa in 1925. The community was named after the ponderosa pine by Elmer E. Hall.

Pondosa existed largely as a logging town, with Pondosa School District established from November 1925 to July 1933. Some structures became the property of McCloud school district. The school was later repurposed as Pondosa Branch Library, circa 1938. Sometime near 1933 logging tapered off and the area largely depopulated.
