= Berry Creek, California =

Berry Creek
- Census-designated place
- Location of Berry Creek in Butte County, California.

- Location in Northern California
- Coordinates: 39°38′43″N 121°24′12″W
- Country: United States
- State: California
- Butte County: Butte County

Area
  - Total: 57.18 sq mi (148.09 km^{2})
  - Land: 57.12 sq mi (147.94 km^{2})
  - Water: 0.058 sq mi (0.15 km^{2}) 0.10%
- Elevation: 1,995 ft (608 m)

Population (2020)
  - Total: 1,637
  - Density: 28.7/sq mi (11.07/km^{2})
- Time zone: UTC-8 (Pacific)
  - Summer (DST): UTC-7 (PDT)
- ZIP code: 95916
- Area code: 530, 837
- GNIS feature IDs: 1658040, 2612472

Berry Creek (formerly, Berry Valley) is a census-designated place about 25 miles (40 km) northeast of Oroville, California in hilly terrain at 2,000 feet (610 m) above mean sea level. The community is located along the Oroville-Quincy Highway on the shore of Madrone Lake. The community is home to Berry Creek Elementary School (K-8), 2 small mountain churches, 1 mini mart w/ gas, 1 small community park. Berry Creek is home to the annual Berry Festival which is held during August.

Berry Creek is inside Area code 530 and wired phone numbers follow the format (530) 589-xxxx. The community's ZIP code is 95916, and is shared with the community of Brush Creek (which is about 4 mi (6.4 km) east on Oroville-Quincy Highway). As of the 2020 census, Berry Creek had a population of 1,637.

There is a California Department of Forestry and Fire Protection fire station at an area called Harts Mill just south of the community. This is a historic name for a community once located at 39°37′25″N 121°26′08″W. Harts Mill was probably a mining community named for a stamp mill. The USGS lists a variant name of Virginia Mill for the area. The CDF Fire Dept is located in Berry Creek approximately 2 mi (3.2 km) past the U.S. Post Office on Hwy 162 (Nearest cross street: Berry Creek Rd/Bloomer Hill Rd). There are two main mountains in Berry Creek to distinguish areas. Bloomer Hill (mountain nearest the Post Office) and Bald Rock mountain (mini mart and community park). The Berry Festival is always held on Bald Rock mountain.

Berry Creek was mostly destroyed by the Bear Fire on September 9, 2020.

== History ==
Berry Creek's first post office was established in 1875 being transferred from Oak Arbor; it changed locations several times before being closed in 1912. It was re-established in 1913, closed again in 1926, and re-opened in 1927.

In November 2018, the Camp Fire, a major wildfire that destroyed Paradise and Concow, threatened all of Berry Creek. Wooded areas of Berry Creek were burnt and some structures were destroyed. Most of Berry Creek was evacuated for two weeks from November 10–24.

On the evening of September 9, 2020, the Bear Fire reached the edge of town at 10 PM PDT and burned nearly all the structures in Berry Creek to the ground, destroying Berry Creek. 14 people were killed in the town.

== Demographics ==
Historical population
Census	Pop.	Note	%±
2010	1,424		—
2020	1,637		15.0%
U.S. Decennial Census; 1850–1870 1880-1890; 1900 1910 1920; 1930 1940 1950; 1960 1970 1980; 1990 2000 2010

Berry Creek first appeared as a census designated place in the 2010 U.S. census.

=== 2020 census ===
As of the 2020 census, Berry Creek had a population of 1,637. The population density was 28.7 inhabitants per square mile (11.1/km^{2}). 0.0% of residents lived in urban areas, while 100.0% lived in rural areas.

Racial composition as of the 2020 census
Race	Number	Percent
White	1,288	78.7%
Black or African American	17	1.0%
American Indian and Alaska Native	76	4.6%
Asian	48	2.9%
Native Hawaiian and Other Pacific Islander	3	0.2%
Some other race	40	2.4%
Two or more races	165	10.1%
Hispanic or Latino (of any race)	117	7.1%

There were 734 households, out of which 16.6% included children under the age of 18. Of all households, 40.7% were married-couple households, 8.7% were cohabiting couple households, 19.9% had a female householder with no spouse or partner present, and 30.7% had a male householder with no spouse or partner present. 30.8% of households were one person, and 14.1% were one person aged 65 or older. The average household size was 2.23, and there were 433 families (59.0% of all households).

The age distribution was 13.2% under the age of 18, 4.6% aged 18 to 24, 20.4% aged 25 to 44, 32.4% aged 45 to 64, and 29.4% who were 65 years of age or older. The median age was 55.5 years. For every 100 females, there were 123.6 males, and for every 100 females age 18 and over, there were 123.4 males age 18 and over.

There were 974 housing units at an average density of 17.1 units per square mile (6.6 units/km^{2}), of which 734 (75.4%) were occupied. Of these, 79.0% were owner-occupied and 21.0% were occupied by renters. Of all housing units, 24.6% were vacant. The homeowner vacancy rate was 1.9%, and the rental vacancy rate was 9.1%.

== Education ==
The vast majority of the CDP is served by the Pioneer Union Elementary School District. Pieces extend into the Feather Falls Union Elementary School District and the Golden Feather Union Elementary School District. All of it is in the Oroville Union High School District.

== Sources ==
- US Department of Education, National Center for Educational Statistics.
- US Geological Survey, National Geographic Names Database.
- US Department of Commerce, miscellaneous records derived from public data sets used to determine geographic attributes like area code and ZIP code.
- Map: Berry Creek, California, 7.5 minute quadrangle, 1994, US Geological Survey.
- US Census Bureau, 2000 census statistical area records, (mostly used for data matching against other sources).
- web site of US Senator Barbara Boxer
