= Fantazzle =

Fantazzle Fantasy Sports
- Industry: Fantasy Sports, Daily Fantasy Sports
- Area served: Worldwide
- Key people: Ryan Parr (CEO)
- Website: Fantazzle.com

Fantazzle was a fantasy sports website that allowed users to play daily, weekly, and seasonal fantasy sports games. Some of the games they offered were free, while others required a monetary deposit. Every game Fantazzle offered resulted in an immediate cash prize. The website has since been shut down.

== History ==
Fantazzle launched in September 2008. They are members of the Fantasy Sports Trade Association (FSTA). In January 2009, Fantazzle was recognized jointly by the FSTA and the Fantasy Football Librarian as the winner of the 2008 Fantasy Football Projection Accuracy Challenge in its first year.

In 2010, Fantazzle released a white paper on the impact of fantasy sports has on workplace productivity. With multiple sources and facts, Fantazzle stated that fantasy sports did not slow down workplace productivity. They proposed that many businesses are not negatively affected by employees engaging in the activity. The white papers went on to say that fantasy sports have proved to be a valuable team building exercise that leads to increased employee loyalty.

In 2010, Fantazzle picked up a sponsorship from current Baltimore Ravens running back Ray Rice. Ray Rice had this to say about Fantazzle: "Wanted you all to check out Fantazzle Fantasy Games. Fantazzle has cool fantasy games for baseball, racing, golf and, of course, football. In the upcoming months, we'll have a Ray Rice fantasy football game I'll be sponsoring with free autographed and cash prizes.” Later in 2010, Fantazzle worked with the then-New York Giants receiver and current St. Louis Ram Steve Smith in a push to have him voted into the Pro Bowl. Fantazzle offered merchandise autographed by Steve Smith to those that won select fantasy games.

== Games ==
Fantazzle offers fantasy football, fantasy baseball, fantasy soccer, fantasy basketball, fantasy golf, fantasy racing, fantasy hockey, fantasy poker, and fantasy games for March Madness. In 2011, Fantazzle became one of the first daily fantasy sports websites to offer college football fantasy games. Fantazzle also added fantasy games for the Lingerie Football League in 2011.

=== Game formats ===
Fantazzle offers daily games, weekly games, twice-a-week games, monthly games, and season-long games. In addition to traditional fantasy sports formats, Fantazzle offers a Pick ‘em game, which allows users to choose different players that are matched up one-on-one with another similar player for a particular stat. Users would then pick which player will have a better performance in that stat. For example, one quarterback would be matched up against another quarterback, and touchdown passes would be compared. If the user chose QB1, who ended up passing for 100 yards and 2 TD, and QB2 passed for 200 yards and 1 TD, then the user would win, because only touchdown passes counted for that matchup. These matchups can be with any position and any sport.

== Affiliated websites ==
Fantazzle is also affiliated with a number of blogs, including Weekly Fantasy Sportal, Fantasy Football Sportal, and Fantasy Baseball Sportal. These blogs are updated periodically to give users fantasy sports advice. Fantazzle also offers a podcast, in which discussions on different fantasy sports are discussed.
