= Utility player =

Athlete who plays multiple different positions within the same sport

In sports, a utility player is one who can play several positions competently. Sports in which the term is often used include association football, basketball, rugby, baseball, softball, ice hockey, and water polo.

The term has gained prominence in all sports due to its use in fantasy leagues, but in rugby union and rugby league, it is commonly used by commentators to recognize a player's versatility.

The use of this term to describe a player may in some circumstances be a backhanded compliment, as it suggests the player is not good enough to be considered a specialist in one position (i.e., a jack of all trades).

== Association football ==
In association football, like other sports, a utility player can play in several positions in the outfield.

Nowadays, most outfield players, especially midfielders, at the professional level can play multiple positions. The most common dual role is when a central defender is played in the left or right full-back position. This often occurs due to injuries to starting full-backs. As central defenders are usually taller, slower, and less technically adept in crossing and attacking play, such a change in position is often accompanied by a tactical shift designed to ensure the player remains in a more defensive posture than regular full-backs would be in. Another common dual role is for faster attacking players to be used as a forward, winger, or a combination of the two roles, known as a "wing-forward".

Examples include Frenchman Eduardo Camavinga of Real Madrid, a midfielder who can also function as a left-sided full-back or winger; Spaniard Sergi Roberto, who played in seven different positions, including full-back, centre-back, midfielder and winger, at Barcelona between 2016 and 2018; and Phil Jones, who has been used as a right-back and centre-back while also taking up occasional midfield roles at Manchester United. Another defender, Bjørn Paulsen from Denmark, is also adept on the wing or in the centre of midfield and has also successfully taken the role of striker, especially when his teams were losing. James Milner, who made over 200 league appearances for Liverpool, has played in central midfield, full-back, winger and even striker.

Ivaylo Yordanov, Lee McCulloch, Magnus Erlingmark and especially Ruud Gullit had played in many outfield roles, with the Dutchman in particular having the ability to change positions within a single game to fill in gaps caused by substitutions. Former Irish international John O'Shea is known for playing in all positions in his tenure with Manchester United. Some footballers even further back in time had also had a high degree of versatility: Bill Lacey, who played his top-flight football with Everton and Liverpool during the pre-war and inter-war periods, played in all eleven traditional positions (10 outfield plus goalkeeper) in his career; John Charles, a legendary figure both in his native Wales and Juventus of Italy, was both a striker and centre-back in his playing days; and 1966 FIFA World Cup winner Martin Peters, who played in every position, including goalkeeper in particularly dire situations, for West Ham United.

In the women's game, notable examples are China's Wang Shanshan and the United States' Crystal Dunn, as well as Germans Simone Laudehr and Linda Bresonik.

Some outfield players have also made competent substitute goalkeepers, for example Phil Jagielka, Jan Koller (originally trained as a goalkeeper before converting into a striker) and Cosmin Moți. But in the case of goalkeepers playing as outfield players, it is extremely rare; David James for Manchester City in 2005 match against Middlesbrough for one instance. Some may be free kick and penalty specialists (Rogério Ceni, José Luis Chilavert, etc.), but they do not hold a proper outfield role.

== Baseball ==
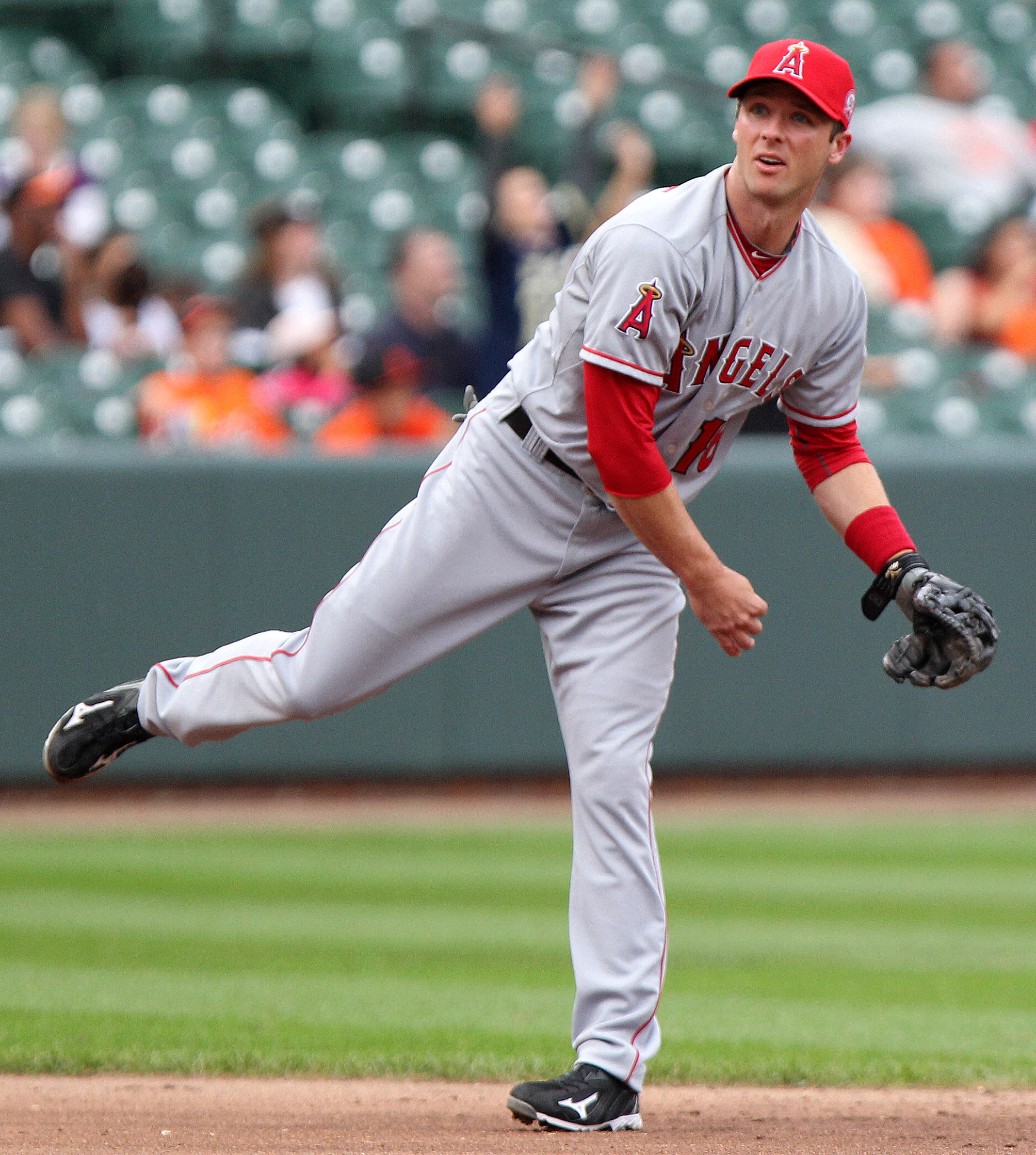
In 2017, Andrew Romine became the fifth player to play all nine positions in a Major League Baseball game.

In baseball, a utility player is a player who can play several different positions. The term has traditionally been connotative of bench players, particularly players valued primarily for defense. Ben Zobrist has been described as the first "super utility player," as he played a large share of positions well and also remained a consistent contributor as a hitter . He played eight different positions in 2009, primarily at second base, right field, and shortstop, and slashed .297/.405/.543 for a 149 OPS+.

A "two-way player" is both a pitcher and position player. It is rare that a player can have the talent to play both roles at the top professional levels of baseball worldwide. Babe Ruth began his career as a pitcher but proved to be such a strong hitter that he briefly alternated in the two roles until becoming a full-time position player. A current example is Shohei Ohtani, who made the Best Nine of Japan's Pacific League as both a pitcher and a hitter in 2016, and is a designated hitter and starting pitcher for the Los Angeles Dodgers and formerly played both roles for the Los Angeles Angels.

== Basketball ==
The term "utility player" is rarely used in basketball outside of fantasy basketball leagues. Instead; basketball uses the terms tweener and swingman to refer to a player who can play two or three different positions, with more specific terms being combo guard, point forward, forward-center, and stretch four.

== American football ==
In American football, the utility player is often capable of playing multiple positions, and often they may play both offense and defense. The concept was far more common in the early days of football, when pro teams used their best athletes in as many ways as possible, and substitutions were far more restricted, meaning players had to stay on the field for offense, defense, and "special teams". This was known as the one-platoon system.

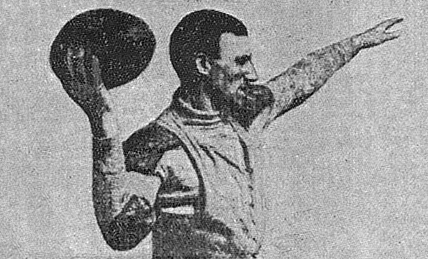
1907 photograph of Bradbury Robinson, who threw the first legal forward pass and was the sport's first triple threat

The triple threat man, who could run, pass, and kick, was particularly popular during the early days of football from the time the forward pass was invented to the World War II era (see, for instance, Bradbury Robinson, Tommy Hughitt, Sammy Baugh, and, during his college years, Johnny Unitas). Most levels of football lifted the substitution restrictions during the post-World War II era in the late 1940s, beginning with "platooning" (use of different offensive and defensive units) and eventually transitioning to complete free substitution. Chuck Bednarik, a center and linebacker, was the last full-time two way player in the NFL, having retired in 1962. Travis Hunter will be the first to attempt to play offense and defense regularly since Bednarik after he was drafted as both a cornerback and wide receiver by the Jacksonville Jaguars in 2025.

The American Football League of the 1960s frequently used players at multiple positions, particularly kickers and punters (e.g. George Blanda, Paul Maguire, Cookie Gilchrist, Gino Cappelletti, and Gene Mingo, a running back who became the first black placekicker in modern professional football, among others). Because of increased injury risk awareness, since the AFL-NFL merger these types of players are increasingly rare, and true utility players usually end up specializing in one position (for example, Lane Johnson played quarterback, tight end, defensive end and offensive tackle through college but was tagged specifically at offensive tackle when drafted into the NFL, and Lorenzo Alexander, who earned a reputation as a "one-man gang" for his ability to play multiple positions, had settled in as a linebacker for most of his career in the NFL). Those that do play multiple positions for any extended period of time are mostly backups (e.g. Guido Merkens and Brad Smith) or career minor-league players (e.g. Don Jonas, Eric Crouch, and Charles Puleri). It is still very common in smaller high schools to see top players play two or even three ways (offense, defense, and special teams), in multiple positions, but in college and pro ball, where rosters are larger and the talent pool is more elite, the injury risk outweighs potential benefits.

In the National Football League, former coach Bill Belichick frequently used utility players during his time with the New England Patriots. Belichick had used his linebackers, including Bryan Cox and Mike Vrabel, as H-backs on offense, and Belichick doubled his wide receivers (e.g. Troy Brown and Randy Moss) as cornerbacks and safeties. Former Arizona Cardinals and Houston Texans defensive end J. J. Watt had also been utilized in multiple positions. Watt lined up at tight end in special goal-line packages in 2014, catching three touchdown passes. The 6' 5" Watt played tight end in high school and his first year of college at Central Michigan before becoming a full-time defensive player. Likewise, Buffalo Bills defensive tackle Kyle Williams played sparingly as a fullback in the last two years of his career, catching a pass, rushing for a touchdown, and blocking for another. William "The Refrigerator" Perry, a defensive tackle for the Chicago Bears, famously played as a fullback to score a touchdown in Super Bowl XX.

The tackle eligible is a special form of utility player. Examples of those who used this play notably include Jason Peters, Warren Sapp, Jumbo Elliott, Mitch Frerotte, Anthony Muñoz, Joe Staley, and Donald Penn. In such a situation, a player who is lined up in the offensive tackle position is eligible to catch a forward pass. Another example of a type of utility player is the halfback option play, in which a running back performs the passing duties of a quarterback. Walter Payton, LaDainian Tomlinson, and, most recently, Derrick Henry have used this play multiple times, and this type of play has spawned an entire offensive scheme. Generally, a player who plays one regular position as well as special teams is usually not considered a utility player, nor are hybrid running back/wide receivers such as Reggie Bush. Only those who play two distinct offensive and/or defensive positions are considered such, as are those who play an offensive or defensive position and in addition kick or punt.

The "offense/offensive weapon" (also known as OW) is an offensive player that can play multiple offensive positions. The OW role contains, but is not limited to, players that can play quarterback, running back, tight end, and wide receiver. Kordell Stewart was the first player to be used in this role back in the 1990s, but it became popular in the early 2010s. Back when Stewart played this role, it was known as the "Slash" role. The Jacksonville Jaguars' OW Denard Robinson was the first to be officially an OW. Recent examples of the OW position include former New York Giants quarterback Joe Webb, Atlanta Falcons running back Cordarrelle Patterson, and New Orleans Saints quarterback Taysom Hill. Webb has also played wide receiver throughout his career, while Hill has lined up at every offensive position with the exception of offensive lineman. Hill also plays special teams as a gunner and kick returner.

The Arena Football League often used ironman players on both sides of the ball with some exceptions that allowed specialist quarterbacks, kickers, wide receivers and defensive backs play both sides of the ball. The league returned to the full use of specialists in 2007. The now-defunct NFL Europe used specialists in the same fashion as the NFL itself.

At lower levels of the sport, especially those outside the American high school and college system, it is common for teams to not have enough players to field offensive & defensive specialist groups. In this case the players will rotate between offense, defense, and special teams. Players with particular talent or athleticism may take part in as many snaps as possible to give their team a better chance of winning.

== Ice hockey ==
In Ice hockey, it is common for centres and wingers to play either position in certain situations. Depending on need, a team may use a natural centreman on the wing if they have too many centres or, conversely, a winger may be pressed to play centre because of a lack of suitable players in that area. Because of the frequency of forwards playing both positions, the term utility player tends to refer not to a player that plays more than one forward position, but to a player that can play both defence and forward. Teams may use a defenceman as a forward, or vice versa, for a variety of reasons.

Sometimes a natural defenceman who struggles on the defensive side of the game but possesses strong offensive qualities may be used as a winger. Marc-Andre Bergeron and Kurtis Foster, for example, have proven to be quality offensive defencemen who struggle in defending their own zone. As such, they have dressed as forwards so their teams can continue to use their offensive abilities on the powerplay while still using the standard six defencemen during even strength.

An extra defenceman may also be pressed to play forward in an emergency situation, where a team has a rash of injuries to their forwards and do not have time to summon a replacement player from a farm team.

It is very common for teams to use a forward on "the point" during the powerplay to provide a greater offensive threat. Though the forward is playing defence in this situation, they are not necessarily seen as true utility players.

Along with Bergeron and Foster, other notable defencemen that have played forward at some point in their careers include Phil Housley, Brent Burns, Mark Streit, Christoph Schubert, Ian White and Chris Campoli. Notable forwards who have played defence include Sergei Fedorov, Mathieu Dandenault, Brooks Laich and Sami Kapanen.

In some cases a player has made a full-time conversion from one position to the other and experienced success. Hockey Hall of Famer Red Kelly spent the first half of his career as an offensive defenceman for the Detroit Red Wings before finishing his career as a strong two-way centreman for the Toronto Maple Leafs. Wendel Clark was a star defenceman in junior before converting to left wing and scoring over 300 goals and 500 points in 15 NHL seasons. (Some junior hockey teams have a tendency to put their best offensive players on defence instead of as forwards, since defencemen generally have more time on the ice.) Dustin Byfuglien is an example of a current player who has made the switch from forward to defence full-time. Jonathan Ericsson of the Detroit Red Wings is another example of a player who converted from forward to defense.

It is extremely rare for goaltenders to play any position other than goaltender; likewise, it is just as rare for non-goaltenders to suit up in goal, because of the significant difference in skills and equipment required for the position.

== Rugby league ==
The use of the utility player in rugby league is more expansive due to limited team sizes and limitations on substitutions. Players will remain on the field during play regardless of which team has the ball and substitutions are commonly done due to physical exhaustion, injury or to replace a player who has performed extremely poorly. A player who cannot defend or who cannot help in attack is unlikely to progress past their early teenage years and be incapable of becoming a professional player.

The playing group is informally split into the physically large "forwards" who play in the middle of the field in order to run the ball upfield to gain attacking momentum, and the quicker "backs" who are usually located toward the edges of the field with pace and agility that attempt to get around or through the stretched out wide defensive line. The positions within these two groups can be very similar and players can interchange freely during the game if required. Utility players may be substitutes who are capable of playing across multiple positions in the forward or back grouping, or have enough pace and power that they could play anywhere on the field. There are also roles that are very similar, such as the halfback and hooker positions with players moving between both as needed to accommodate talents of other players in the team. There are also generalist utility players who may be picked as the last man in the substitutes bench that are considered good enough to play different positions as injury cover if required. Lance Hohaia is a prime example of this as he played in six different positions in his NRL career.

== Rugby union ==
Utility player is a term used mostly in New Zealand. In rugby union, it comes in a form of utility back. It is mostly a back who can cover at least two positions. Notable examples in New Zealand include Daniel Bowden, Luke McAlister and Cory Jane, but Australia also has many utility backs like Adam Ashley-Cooper, Kurtley Beale, Matt Giteau and James O'Connor. South African examples are François Steyn and Johan Goosen.Example of English utility backs include Austin Healey, who played for England as a scrum-half, fly-half, wing and full back, and Mike Catt, who was capped as a fly-half, centre and full back. French Thomas Ramos, Jérémy Sinzelle and Damien Traille are known for their versatility too.

Despite that, there are forwards who are capable of covering multiple positions. Many players in the back row of the scrum (flankers and number eights) will frequently switch between the two positions, like Grégory Alldritt, David Pocock or Kieran Read. Notable players in English rugby have made the transition between back row to the back line as they possess transferable skills and are usually the quicker and more mobile of the pack, more often a player may also be capable of playing lock as well as a back row position, with several modern examples being Sébastien Chabal, Maro Itoje, Courtney Lawes, Steven Luatua and Cameron Woki, all with international caps in both rows of the scrum. However, this description never applies to props who can play both ends of the front row (i.e. Numbers 1 & 3), unless the player has the ability to cover as a hooker (e.g. John Afoa, a prop who could cover as a hooker, or John Smit, primarily a hooker but also capped internationally at both prop positions).

== Fantasy sports ==
In fantasy baseball and basketball, a utility player is a player (specifically a batter in baseball) who accumulates statistics without being assigned to a particular position. The batter can play any position; he need not actually be a utility player (for example, if a fantasy manager has two first baseman, he can assign one to the first base position and one to a utility slot). Similarly, a person assigned a utility slot in fantasy basketball need not be a tweener or swingman.
