= Fleaflicker (website) =

Fantasy sports website

Fleaflicker.com
- Website type: Fantasy Sports
- Owner: Fleaflicker LLC
- Creator: Ori Schwartz
- Website: fleaflicker.com
- Launched: 2005
- Current status: Active

Fleaflicker.com is a fantasy sports platform that hosts fantasy American football, baseball, basketball and ice hockey leagues each year. The service is free and is available via web browsers and mobile applications for iOS and Android devices. To play, fantasy commissioners form and customize leagues of 4 to 24 teams and hold a draft consisting of real-world players. Team owners build and manage their roster of players with the goal of building the most talented and winning team over the course of the season. Teams compete head-to-head or in roto or total points leagues.

== Overview ==
The Fleaflicker site displays recent and historical stats, live scoring, player news and league and team settings. For football, Fleaflicker offers 125 scoring categories and 12 distinct NFL positions including IDP positions and punters plus any combination of flex positions, as well as a one-click ESPN league import tool.

Members have the opportunity to upgrade to Fleaflicker’s proprietary Competitive Edge analysis providing an integrated layer of extra insight and analysis, and they also offer an ad-free experience available on a per-season basis.

== History ==
Fleaflicker was founded in 2005 by Ori Schwartz, who is also the current lead developer and has previously worked with IBM, AOL and the U.S. digital service. Fleaflicker rose to popularity in the 2005 NFL season, when many larger fantasy sites suffered major outages and fans were forced to look elsewhere. They turned to Fleaflicker and discovered features and options that were not available on the larger sites.

Fleaflicker became a subsidiary of AOL in 2008 in order to fill a need for a fantasy sports league experience on the AOL platform, and in 2011 it became independent once again. Fleaflicker’s founder, Ori Schwartz, has remained with the company since inception.
