= Fantasy golf =

Fantasy golf is a game in which the participants assemble virtual teams of professional golfers. The competitors select their rosters by participating in a draft in which all relevant golfers are available, with games typically involving players in the US PGA Tour and the European Tour. Fantasy points are awarded based on those golfers' real-life performance in tournaments; many formats exist both for scoring and player selection.

== History ==
Fantasy golf was one of the first fantasy sports to utilize the concept of participants selecting real-life athletes and tracking their future performance in order to earn points. In the 1950s, Oakland, California businessman Wilfred "Bill" Winkenbach developed a fantasy golf game in which participants would select a roster of professional golfers and compare their scores at the end of a given tournament, with the lowest combined total of strokes winning. Winkenbach is also credited with developing an early version of fantasy baseball and creating the first fantasy football league.

A national newspaper fantasy golf game, Fairway Fantasy, was created by telecommunications company Phoneworks in 1991 following the success of other fantasy contests run by the company. In Fairway Fantasy, participants selected a roster of PGA Tour players participating in upcoming tour events over the phone. The Phoneworks contests contributed to the interconnectivity of fantasy sports and would soon encourage the development of fantasy sports over the Internet.

Daily fantasy sports firms, such as DraftKings, began offering fantasy golf games in the 2010s. In 2015, DraftKings co-founder Matt Kalish stated that golf was the fastest-growing sport on the site aside from football, basketball, and baseball.

According to the Fantasy Sports & Gaming Association, as of 2023, around 9% of fantasy sports players in the United States and Canada play fantasy golf.

== League types ==
A fantasy golf league may be organized in a variety of ways. While some leagues award points based on player scores in tournament events, others rank the league's participants based upon the prize money earnings of their respective rosters. Leagues may compete across an entire year or a single tournament; under the "one-and-done" format, the league is contested across a full season, but each participant selects a single golfer to accrue points in each week's tournament, providing players the with opportunity to select a different golfer every week.

== See also ==
Fantasy sports
