= Fantasy auto racing =

Fantasy auto racing is a type of fantasy sports game based on motor sports. Players, also known as fantasy team owners, select a roster of drivers to earn points according to actual race results. Player scores, as determined by their drivers' actual racing results, are sorted within a league of players to determine weekly, periodic and championship winners. Games can be free or pay-to-play with cash or merchandise as prizes.

Inspired by the popularity of Fantasy football, American fantasy auto racing games began in the late 1980s but didn't become popular until the advent of the internet. Games are usually based on activities and race results from the most popular, broadcast-live forms of motor sports like Formula One, NASCAR, IndyCar, Daytona Prototype and the American Le Mans Series racing. Fantasy auto racing games can be run season-long, from Winter Speed Weeks at Daytona through the last major race weekend of the season, or they are segmented to award quarterly prizes and attract new players throughout the year.

Fantasy racing rules, formats and point systems vary widely. Most American games follow NASCAR Cup racing and award driver points based on the official NASCAR points system. To reduce the likelihood of ties, game rules can restrict driver starts according to criteria based on salary caps, driver rankings or frequency of selection. Games that follow one specific series combine driver or roster salary caps with a point system based on predictions for driver pit strategy, advancement or retreat from starting position, fastest lap or qualifying performance. Other games follow the results of all the top stock car racing, open wheel racing, drag racing and sports car racing series and require players to pick at least one driver from each race per weekend in filling out a seven driver roster.

For 2018, Yahoo Sports will no longer offer Fantasy Auto Racing, providing the following message to users:

"The Yahoo Sports Fantasy Auto Racing season has concluded. Thank you for your participation this year and congratulations to all the winners. We will not be offering Fantasy Auto Racing in 2018. We thank you very much for playing our game over the years and hope you will continue to play our other fantasy games."

== NASCAR Fantasy Live ==
NASCAR Fantasy Live allows fantasy owners to select 5 drivers per race. Each driver is given points based on their finishing position, place differential, pass differential, laps led, and fastest laps.

=== Driver Selection ===
Owners are given a salary cap of $100 each week to select their team. Drivers' salaries are adjusted on Wednesdays before the next weekend's race.

=== Points ===
Finishing position awards points as follows: 1st = 43, 2nd = 42, 3rd = 41,...43rd = 1

Place differential points are determined by the number of positions a driver gains or loses from their starting position. For example, if a driver starts on pole and finishes 12th, that driver will be penalized -11 points. However, if that driver started 12th and finishes 1st, the driver will be awarded +11 points.

Pass differential points are determined based on the number of green flag passes and driver has minus the number of times the driver was passed under green. Pass differential can also penalize drivers with negative points.

Laps led points are determined by dividing the number of laps a driver led by 2.

Fastest laps points are determined by dividing the number of fastest laps a driver had by 2.

== Yahoo Fantasy Racing ==
Yahoo's point structure is depicted in the tables below. A driver can only be used 9 times each season by an owner. Additionally, drivers are ranked each week in 3 tiers (A, B, and C). Tiers A and C, owners select 1 starter and 1 bench driver. For Tier B, owners select 2 starters and 2 bench drivers. Driver selection deadline is 2:00 a.m. PT on the day of qualifying. After this deadline, owners are able to replace their starter drivers with their bench drivers up to 5 minutes prior to race start.

=== Driver Selection ===
Yahoo does not use a salary cap to structure its driver selection. Instead, it uses a 3 tiered system (A, B, & C) that is ranked each week. Owners select 1 starter and 1 bench driver for tiers A and C. For tier B, owners select 2 starters and 2 bench drivers.

=== Points ===
A driver that in on pole earns 10 points, followed by 5 for 2nd, 3 for 3rd, and 1 for 4th. Drivers that qualify below 4th do not earn qualifying points.

Finishing points are determined as follows: 1st = 90, 2nd = 88, 3rd = 86,...43rd = 6

Leading a lap earns a driver 10 points and leading the most laps adds an additional 10 points.

== Wind Tunnel Super 7 Sweep ==
SPEED's Wind Tunnel Super 7 Sweep created by Bill Tybur of Arizona follows seven different series: NASCAR Sprint Cup, Nationwide and Camping World Trucks; Formula 1, IndyCar, American Le Mans Series and Grand-Am Rolex. Players select a roster of seven starters before each weekend's races and they must select at least one driver or car (for the sports car races) per scheduled race. Lineups are due by 12:00 am on the day of each weekend's first race.

=== Driver Selection ===
Players select from a collection of all known potential entries per series; starter lists do not reflect official entry lists. Players must select at least one starter per each race each weekend in order to complete their full seven starter roster. There are no tiers, salary caps or other restrictions on selecting starters.

=== Points ===
Points are awarded to the top 16 finishers per race. Points are awarded by finish position, qualifying performance and whether the car or driver led one lap or the most laps. Points are also awarded to the highest finishing driver or car per manufacturer; no bonus points are awarded to drivers that finish lower than 16th and it is possible for a driver who finishes behind another to score more points.

== NASCAR Fantasy Live vs. Yahoo Fantasy Racing ==
The most notable difference between Yahoo and NASCAR Fantasy Live is the way finishing position is weighted. Yahoo places a greater emphasis on finishing than NASCAR Fantasy Live. For example, a driver who qualifies in the top 5, but slips to the mid 20s during the race and never recovers can have a negative point total in NASCAR Fantasy Live. Alternatively, in Yahoo's format that driver would likely have around 50 points or about 50% of the points that the race winner would likely have. Another difference between the two formats is that Yahoo requires owners to lock in their drivers before qualifying.

NASCAR Fantasy Live places a strong emphasis on place differential. It is important to understand the upside and downside risk that starting position affects. For example, the average points for position differential when starting 1st are -11.6. Conversely, starting 43rd has an average of +9.2 for position differential.

Another important point scoring category is passing differential. This category is strongly correlated to who the driver is than it is to starting position. While finishing points are typically the largest point contributor to total points in NASCAR Fantasy Live, place and passing differentials collectively can often provide a driver with more points than simply finishing 1st.

== Super 7 Sweep vs. NASCAR Cup games ==
The Super 7 Sweep is based on a game that was developed to mimic fantasy football games; i.e. fantasy team owners would start weekly lineups with NFL players at different gridiron positions. In that respect the NASCAR game participants are only concerned with quarterbacks, e.g. Sprint Cup drivers. Super 7 Sweep players select QBs plus running backs, receivers, kickers and defenses; i.e. NNS and Camping World Truck drivers, IndyCar and Formula 1 drivers, ALMS and Rolex Series sports cars.

Most NASCAR games are for Sprint Cup fans exclusively while Super 7 Sweep -type games appeal to motorsports fans who are aware and interested in other series as well. The Super 7 Sweep persuades players to follow the results and activities of those other series in order to score maximum points.
