= Ron Shandler =

In 1986, Ron Shandler began publishing the Baseball Forecaster, an annual publication focused on applying sabermetrics to fantasy baseball, and later founded Baseball HQ, a website with the same focus. Shandler has an MBA from Hofstra University.

Among his innovations in fantasy baseball is analyzing the "Strand Rate" - the percentage of baserunners a pitcher allows who fail to score (Baseball Prospectus has a similar statistic, Bequeathed Runs Prevented). Shandler discovered that 72 percent of baserunners on average never cross the plate, so if a pitcher has a higher or lower strand rate there's a chance it will affect his ERA in the opposite direction in the future. The concept of runners being stranded on base was probably not first conceived of by Shandler. Sabermetrician Keith Woolner has been researching support-neutral statistics since at least 1993, and has often discussed concepts similar to Strand Rate (e.g., Bequeathed Runners inherited/stranded).

Shandler created Tout Wars in 1997 after being fed up with the lack of promotion USA Today gave its annual LABR fantasy baseball experts league. He also founded the Annual Fantasy Baseball Symposium at the Arizona Fall League, one of the largest gatherings of fantasy baseball players, now in its 16th year.

Shandler's success as a fantasy player includes the most wins in major fantasy baseball expert leagues. He won both the NL and AL Tout Wars competitions in 1998 (being the only time anyone has ever won dual championships in the history of national experts competitions), AL Tout Wars in 2000, NL LABR in 2001, and the Fantasy Sports Trade Association League in 2010. He has contributed columns to the sports section of the Huffington Post, ESPN Magazine, ESPN.com, and USA Today. In 2004, he was selected to help form an advisory board for the St. Louis Cardinals, which he served on for approximately two years.

In 2004, Shandler received the Lifetime Achievement Award from the Fantasy Sports Trade Association. In 2012, he was inducted into the Fantasy Sports Writers Association's Hall of Fame.

On April 30, 2013, Shandler announced he would be stepping down from running Baseball HQ, which he had sold to USA Today five years prior. He continues to write columns for USA Today, ESPN, and The Athletic, and continues to contribute to the Baseball Forecaster and remains active in the fantasy baseball community.

He now runs his own site, RonShandler.com where he promotes his latest innovation: the Broad Assessment Balance Sheet (BABS) approach to fantasy baseball team construction.

== See also ==
- Fantasy baseball
- Fantasy sport
