= Fantasy Sports Association =

Logo of the Fantasy Sports Association.

The Fantasy Sports Association (FSA) is a trade group that was found in 2006 to advance the interests of the fantasy sports industry. It folded in 2010, leaving the Fantasy Sports Trade Association as the industry's only trade group.

== Mission ==
The association is charged with promoting the fantasy sports industry, providing consulting services to its members, and strategic advice to organizations interested gaining value from fantasy sports. Like other industry trade associations, the FSA focuses on:

- increasing the economic value of the industry
- growing the number of participants, sponsors, products, and services
- conducting industry research
- operating industry conferences
- lobbying for the industry

The FSA's mission is similar to the mission of the Fantasy Sports Trade Association, which was founded in 1999.

== Members ==
The association was founded in 2006 by major fantasy sports industry players including: America Online, CBS Sports, EA Sports, ESPN, Krause (NFFC), Fanball, World Championship of Fantasy Football, Fantasy Sports Ventures, Fox Sports Interactive Media, FS Dashboard, Head2Head, LiveHive Systems, NBA, NBC Sports Digital, NFL, PGA Tour, PLAYERS INC, Pro Trade, Sporting News, STATS, Inc., and Yahoo!.

== Current Board of Directors ==
Chairman: Clay Walker, Senior Vice President of PLAYERS INC

Additional members of the FSA Board of Directors include:

- Steve Byrd, Executive Vice President, STATS LLC
- Barry Dorf, Producer of EA Sports Fantasy Football, Electronic Arts
- Kenny Gersh, Vice President of Business Development, SportsLine.com, Inc.
- Jeff Gerttula, General Manager of Fantasy Games, The Sporting News
- Josh Goodstadt, Assistant Vice President of Multimedia and Interactive, PLAYERS INC
- Kevin Gralen, President, Head2Head Sports LLC
- Emil Kadlec, President, Fantasy Sports Championships, Inc. (WCOFF)
- David Katz, Head of Sports & Entertainment, Yahoo! Inc
- Mike Kerns, Founder, Pro Trade, Inc.
- Joe Nahra, Staff Counsel, PLAYERS INC
- Craig Peters, Vice President of Business Development, Fox Sports Interactive Media
- Rob Phythian, President, Fanball Acquisitions, LLC
- Ross Schaufelberger, General Manager of AOL Sports, America Online, Inc.

== See also ==
- Fantasy Sports
