= NBC Sports Edge =

American sports betting website

Rotoworld
- Owner: NBC Sports Group
- Website: nbcsports.com/fantasy
- Registration: Optional

Rotoworld (formerly NBC Sports Edge) is an American fantasy sports and sports betting website. It features sports news and analysis for fantasy sports and sports betting.

Rotoworld was created in 1998 by Richard Pike and Mike Oliveto, the co-founders of Allstar Stats, Inc. Matthew Pouliot was hired as the lead writer for Rotoworld in 1999. Pouliot was inducted into the Fantasy Sports Writers Association Hall of Fame in 2014.

Rotoworld was acquired by NBC Sports in 2006. In 2019, the site underwent a redesign with a larger focus on video content, mobile, and new search tools. In February 2021, Rotoworld was temporarily rebranded as NBC Sports Edge, carrying a larger emphasis on sports betting content and integration with NBC Sports television programming. As of 2023, the site no longer carries the Edge branding. It no longer exists and its content has been integrated into the NBC Sports website.

== Awards and recognition ==
=== 2005 ===
- Fantasy Sports Trade Association: Fantasy Content and services award for "Fantasy Magazine"

=== 2007 ===
- Fantasy Sports Trade Association: Unique Contest
- Fantasy Sports Trade Association: Draft Kit
- Fantasy Sports Trade Association: Fantasy Magazine
- Fantasy Sports Trade Association: Online Content service

=== 2008 ===
- Fantasy Sports Trade Association: Best Online Content Service

=== 2009 ===
- Fantasy Sports Trade Association: Fantasy Content and Services award for: "Draft Kit" & "Specialty Products or Services"

=== 2011 ===
- Fantasy Sports Trade Association: Most Valuable Fantasy Content

=== 2012 ===
- Fantasy Sports Trade Association: Most Innovative Fantasy Product or Service

=== 2013 ===
- Fantasy Sports Trade Association: Most Valuable Fantasy Content

=== 2014 ===
- Fantasy Sports Trade Association: Best Content: Multiple-Sports Sites
- Fantasy Sports Writers Association: Matthew Pouilot, 2014 Hall of Fame Class
- Fantasy Sports Writers Association: Best Football Series Column - Evan Silva
- Fantasy Sports Writers Association: Basketball Writer of the Year - Aaron Bruski
