= FSTA =

FSTA may refer to:

- Future Strategic Tanker Aircraft
- Fantasy Sports Trade Association
- Food Science and Technology Abstracts
