= Franchise Football League: Fantasy Football =

1991 video game

Franchise Football League: Fantasy Football is a 1991 software published by Space Tech Enterprises.

== Gameplay ==
Franchise Football League: Fantasy Football is a database program intended for running a fantasy football league.

== Reception ==
Wyatt Lee and J.D. Lambright reviewed the program for Computer Gaming World, and stated that

In spite of the weight given to quarterbacks and kickers, Franchise Football League: Fantasy Football has just about everything one could want in a fantasy football league program. It facilitates the massive amount of bookkeeping required to keep a league going and will allow many more football fans to enjoy the weekly performances of their favorite players, even if their favorite learn goes down in defeat.

== Reviews ==
- VideoGames & Computer Entertainment
- https://www.newspapers.com/article/columbia-daily-tribune/173661134/
