= Flea flicker (disambiguation) =

The flea flicker is an unorthodox "trick play" in American football.

Flea flicker may also refer to:

- Fleaflicker (website), an online fantasy sports platform
- Operation Flea Flicker, part of the Iraqi coalition counter-insurgency operations
- A type of jig in fly fishing
- A brand of monofilament fishing line
