= Tout Wars =

Tout Wars is the most high-profile fantasy baseball experts league and was the focus of the 2006 best-selling book Fantasyland. It was created in 1997 by Ron Shandler who was fed up with the lack of promotion USA Today gave its annual LABR fantasy baseball experts league. The drafts are conducted each year in late March shortly before the MLB season and include a 12 team AL-only league, a 13-team NL-only league and a 12-team mixed league (added in 2005). Tout Wars was featured as the subject of a 2010 documentary called "Fantasyland" based on the book.

== See also ==
- Tout Wars
- 2010 Mixed League Review
- 2007 Tout Wars Standings
