= Fantasy basketball =

Reality-based basketball game

Fantasy basketball is a game in which the participants serve as owners and general managers of virtual professional basketball teams. The competitors select their rosters by participating in a draft in which all relevant National Basketball Association (NBA) players are available. Fantasy points are awarded in weekly matchups based on the actual performances of basketball players in real-world competition. The game typically involves the NBA, but can also involve other leagues, such as the Women's National Basketball Association (WNBA) or NCAA.

== History ==
In the decades following the success of early fantasy leagues, such as Rotisserie League Baseball, the concept of applying the fantasy format to sports other than baseball and American football grew in popularity. This trend was due in large part to increased capabilities to easily compute and access sports statistics via the Internet.

In 2014, the NBA invested in daily fantasy sports company FanDuel. At the time, the legality of daily fantasy sports was not widely recognized. However, following the 2018 United States Supreme Court decision in Murphy v. National Collegiate Athletic Association, which allowed states to legalize sports betting, questions surrounding the legality of daily fantasy sports, as well as fantasy sports in general, within the United States have largely been settled. As of August 2022, FanDuel operates daily fantasy contests, including basketball competitions, in 44 US states.

== League types ==
A fantasy basketball league may be organized in a variety of ways. In rotisserie leagues, the scoring system is based on a series of preset statistical categories (such as points, rebounds, and assists, etc.) in the same format as Rotisserie League Baseball. Each team is ranked in each category at the end of the season. Points are then awarded based on these rankings. For example, in an eight-team league, the team that collectively blocks the most shots might earn eight points, the team that blocks the second most might earn seven, and so on. The number of statistics for which the teams are ranked may vary. Another common format is head-to-head competition, in which each team only competes against one other team in a given week. At the end of the week, the winner of each matchup may be determined in a variety of ways. In addition to scoring variations, league organization may also differ based on the structure of each team's roster.

=== Categories ===
Fantasy basketball leagues may use a variety of statistical categories to evaluate teams. Both rotisserie and head-to-head leagues use categories, either to rank all teams against one another at the end of a season or to determine the winners of weekly matchups between pairs of teams. For example, Yahoo! Sports hosts fantasy competitions with eight or nine categories. (Note: These leagues are known as "8-cat" and "9-cat" leagues, respectively.) The following are the nine default categories used by Yahoo! Sports.

- points
- rebounds
- assists
- steals
- blocks
- three-point field goals
- field goal percentage
- free throw percentage
- turnovers (Note: Lower values for this statistic are better.)

In a rotisserie league, following the end-of-season ranking in all categories, the team with the most points wins the league. In some leagues, the number of points awarded in each statistical category may be adjusted, rather than all of them being worth the same number of points.

=== Rotisserie (ROTO) ===
In rotisserie scoring, the real-life statistics accumulated by the players on a team are aggregated and ranked against the same statistics for the other teams in the league. Fantasy points are earned based on these rankings. For example, in a twelve-team league, the team with the most rebounds over the course of the season to date would be awarded twelve fantasy points. The team with the next-highest number of rebounds would be awarded eleven fantasy points, and so on, with the team with the fewest rebounds being awarded a single fantasy point. For negative categories like fouls or turnovers, the team with the fewest statistics is awarded the most fantasy points. This is done for all categories counted by the particular league. The team with the highest number of fantasy points at the end of the season is the winner.

Rotisserie scoring encourages balance on the team's roster. Winning the rebounds category by one rebound or by one thousand rebounds counts the same, while winning the steals category by one steal and the assists category by one assist is worth twice as many points as winning the single rebounding category by one thousand rebounds. Successful teams must fare well in several categories to win in rotisserie leagues. Some teams may elect to "punt" one or several categories by being intentionally poor in that category to optimize their roster for the other categories.

=== Head-to-head (H2H) ===
In head-to-head scoring, teams compete against a single other team over the course of a week. During that week, the real-life statistics of the players on each team are accumulated, and at the end of the week the team with the most points over the week wins.

There are three styles of head-to-head scoring:

- Most categories is a win—whichever team has the more favorable statistics in the categories chosen (most points, fewest turnovers, highest free throw percentage, etc.) is awarded a point for that category. One can also weight each category, for example: winning scoring earns a player three points, winning rebounds wins two points, winning steals wins one point. The team with the most points wins that game.
- Each category is a win—whichever team has the more favorable statistics in a category (most points, fewest turnovers, highest free throw percentage, etc.) is awarded a "win" for that category. The other team is tagged with a "loss". The results of these weekly match-ups are accumulated to provide a seasonal win–loss record.
- Points format - teams accumulate fantasy points throughout the week from each of their starters (similar to fantasy football) and whichever team scores the most fantasy points by the end of the matchup wins. An alternative style to points leagues is called Game Peak Mode, which is a scoring format that counts only one game's worth of fantasy points from a certain number of players on a team. This format helps eliminate the imbalance of games played between two teams in a given week.

== Daily fantasy basketball ==
Like traditional fantasy basketball, in daily fantasy basketball, players draft a team of NBA players who then score fantasy points according to set scoring rules. However, instead of each competitor having the same team for an entire season, daily fantasy sports contests last just one day. Many sites offer data and strategies to build lineups; some of these sites are free, while others charge a fee. Some other daily basketball contests incorporate a few of the traditional settings combined with daily fantasy basketball settings to create a new experience for users.

== Draft ==
Before each season, fantasy basketball leagues hold a draft in which each team drafts NBA players. These players are kept on the roster of the team that drafted them unless they are traded for other players or are dropped, whereby they enter a pool of unowned players that any team may claim. The order of draft picks may be determined randomly or by the league standings from the previous year, in which the team with the worst record picks first, followed by the team with the second-worst record, etc. In some cases, owners retain the same draft position in each round. In contrast, in a traditional "serpentine" or "snake" draft, owners draft players in a "snake" method, in which the owner who picks first in the odd rounds picks last in the even rounds, the owner who picks second in the odd rounds picks second to last in the even rounds, etc. in the interest of fairness.

In an auction draft, each owner has an imaginary budget which must be used to purchase players in an auction format. Owners take turns nominating players for open bid, and the owner who bids the highest on each player receives that player, reducing his or her remaining budget accordingly. One proposed advantage of auction drafts is their ability to offer every owner equal access to every player, whereas in a traditional format, a certain owner's desired player may be selected by another team before the owner's next turn to pick.

Drafts can be conducted in "live" or "auto" formats. Live drafts involve team owners selecting players in real time, while auto drafts are those in which selections are made automatically by computer based on pre-draft rankings set by each owner. Often, owners who are not present at the chosen time of the draft will "auto-draft" while the rest of the league makes their selections live.

Regardless of format, the vast majority of fantasy drafts take place online, but some leagues hold in-person drafts in which selections are made on computers or physical draft boards.

Regardless of the format in which a draft is held, each team owner may employ a variety of strategies when making his or her selections. In order to select the best possible players, owners must evaluate the talent and forecast the performance of each player for the upcoming season. A variety of resources may be used to this effect, including rankings released by fantasy basketball journalists and websites.

== Team rosters ==
For a standard 12-team league, the manager will usually draft 13 players. The roster considers to draft the following:

- Point Guard (PG) 1
- Shooting Guard (SG) 1
- Small Forward (SF) 1
- Power Forward (PF) 1
- Center (C) 1
- Guard (G) 1
- Forward (F) 1
- Utility (UTIL) 3
- Bench (BE) 3

Some leagues include an IR (Injury Reserve) roster spot pushing the count of the roster to 14. The IR is an extra spot on the roster that is used for players who suffer a prolonged injury or are out indefinitely.

Some leagues also have a limit on the number of positions you can draft. For example; ESPN allows only a maximum of 4 centers on a roster. This is to prevent a manager from drafting a majority of centers, leaving no centers for other managers.

=== Keeper/Dynasty leagues ===
In a keeper/dynasty league, the season does not finish at the end of the year. A manager's team is carried over in the following season and players can be kept between seasons. A commissioner can decide:

- Player Tenure: How long a player can be kept before he is released back into the pool of draft-able players.
- Team Tenure: The longer a player is kept the more that player costs to that manager's team.
- Draft Position: Where a player is drafted determines how much the player will cost.
- Player Salary: The value associated with each player and how much that value increases and decreases each season.

Rankings for keeper/dynasty leagues differ from regular season-by-season rankings, and factor in a player's age, future development potential, and long-term status with their team. Also considered are their initial fantasy draft position or auction value as players can often be kept the following year as the selection in the same draft position or for the same auction price.

=== Waiver wire ===
Waiver wire is specifically used for player transactions. The waiver wire consists of a list of available players that were not drafted and/or players that were dropped from a manager's roster. Managers can also drop a player(s), which inserts the dropped player into the waiver wire. Waiver wire is accessible to all players in a league. Waiver wire may have restrictions / specific rules depending on commissioner's preferred settings. Commissioners can set a bidding system when picking the un-drafted players as more than 1 person will want this specific player, where the winning bid will get the desired player.

== Demographics ==
According to the Fantasy Sports & Gaming Association (FSGA), an estimated 62.5 million people played fantasy sports in the US and Canada in 2022. The FSGA estimated that 19% of American adults played fantasy sports in 2023, compared to 13% in 2014. Around 32% of fantasy players play fantasy basketball, making it the second most popular fantasy sport behind fantasy football. A 2023 FSGA survey found that 64% of fantasy sports players were male, 48% were between the ages of 18 and 34, and 84% had a college degree or higher. A 2015 analysis found that 89.8% were white and 51.5% were unmarried.
