= LABR =

Fantasy sports league

LABR was the first high-profile fantasy sports experts league of its kind. Formed by John Hunt, the fantasy baseball columnist for USA Today Baseball Weekly, the league was first formed in 1994 and featured such celebrities as Peter Gammons, Keith Olbermann and Bill James. LABR stands for League of Alternative Baseball Reality and was given that nickname and the pronunciation ("labor") by Olbermann as a play on words with the labor strike in baseball at that time. Hunt ran the league and published the results of the LABR league in the Baseball Weekly's (now USA Today Sports Weekly) fantasy baseball preview issue each March from 1994 through 2006. He opted not to return for the 2007 league and was replaced with in-house staff. The dollar values players were sold for in the fantasy league are used as a benchmark for readers in their own fantasy drafts.

On its 20th anniversary in 2013 Steve Gardner of USA Today published the LABR of love: Experts fantasy league begins 20th season documenting its first two decades.

The LABR has lost its early status as the premier experts' league, as in 1997 a rival fantasy baseball experts league, Tout Wars, was created by Ron Shandler, who was fed up with the lack of promotion USA Today gave the LABR league.

The LABR Mixed league, AL-Only league and NL-Only league are online and can be viewed by the general public.

The 2020 Major League Baseball season was a 60-game pandemic shortened season. LABR auctions and drafts occurred during Spring Training before the pandemic shutdown.

== Scoring rules ==
LABR uses a Ranked, Rotisserie Based Scoring System of 5 batting categories and 5 pitching categories (5x5).

If there are N teams in the LABR, N points shall be awarded for first place in a category, N-1 for second place, down to 1 point for last place. In the event of a tie, the points will be split. Points will be aggregated over all ten scoring categories (see below). The team with the most points wins.

Example: LABR has 15 teams. Team A has the most home runs, and is awarded 15 points in that category. Teams B and C are tied for second in home runs; they split the second and third place points, and each receive 13.5 points. If a team finished first in all 10 categories, it would receive a total of 15*10=150 points. If it finished last in all categories, it would receive 1*10=10 points. In the case of ties in total points, the final places in the standings are determined by comparing the placement of the teams in the individual categories. The team ahead in a category is given a point. This is done over all categories. The team with the most points is declared the winner. Should the teams still be tied after this process, then the final result shall be declared a tie.

Batting Categories

- Batting Average
- Runs
- Home Runs
- Runs Batted In
- Stolen Bases

Pitching Categories

- Wins
- Earned Run Average
- WHIP (Walks+Hits)/(Innings Pitched)
- Strikeouts
- Saves

Each team will be required to attain a minimum of 950 innings pitched in order to qualify for placement in the pitching categories of; a) Ratio and b) Earned Run Average, and a minimum of 4,200 at-bats for placement in the batting average category. If these minimum innings or at-bats are not achieved the team will receive 1 point in these categories and every team that meets the minimum innings pitched or at-bats will be ranked in the standings with 15 points for 1st place and so on until all qualifying teams have received points.

== Rosters ==
Rosters shall consist of a lineup of 23 players and a bench of 6 reserve players.

A team's active roster consists of the following players: 5 outfielders, 2 catchers, 1 second baseman, 1 shortstop, 1 middle infielder (either second baseman or shortstop), 1 first baseman, 1 third baseman, 1 corner infielder (first or third baseman), one utility player who may be of any position and 9 pitchers (who may be either starters, relievers or both).

There will also be six reserve players on each team's roster to be selected on draft day. Players who go onto the disabled list may also be reserved on a separate list. There is no limit to the number of disabled list players that can exist on a roster.

Only members of the active roster generate statistics.

== Results ==
Past Champions
	AL-Only Auction	NL-Only Auction	Mixed Draft
2025	Ian Kahn	Matt Cederholm - Baseball HQ	Ryan Bloomfield - Baseball HQ
2024	James Anderson - Rotowire	Doug Dennis - Baseball HQ	Rudy Gamble - Razzball
2023	Jason Collette - Fangraphs	Glenn Colton / Rick Wolf - Colton & The Wolfman	Ryan Bloomfield - Baseball HQ
2022	Eno Sarris - The Athletic	Mike Gianella - Baseball Prospectus	Steve Gardner - USA Today Sports
2021	Ian Kahn - The Athletic	Derek Carty - Derek Carty	Jeff Erickson - Rotowire
2020	Larry Schechter - Winning Fantasy Baseball	Derek Carty - Derek Carty	Fred Zinkie - Fred Zinkie
2019	Glenn Colton / Rick Wolf - Colton & The Wolfman	Derek VanRiper - The Athletic	Steve Gardner - USA Today Sports
2018	Glenn Colton / Rick Wolf - Colton & The Wolfman	Howard Bender - Fantasy Alarm	Derek VanRiper - Rotowire
2017	Steve Gardner - USA TODAY Sports	Steve Gardner - USA TODAY Sports	Jake Ciely - The Athletic
2016	Larry Schechter - Winning Fantasy Baseball	Derek Carty - ESPN/RotoGrinders	Todd Zola - Mastersball
2015	Steve Gardner - USA TODAY Sports	Derek VanRiper - RotoWire	Mike Gianella/Bret Sayre - Baseball Prospectus
2014	Dave Adler - Baseball HQ	Lenny Melnick - RotoExperts	Steve Gardner - USA TODAY Sports
2013	Larry Schechter - Winning Fantasy Baseball	Greg Ambrosius/Shawn Childs - NFBC	Fred Zinkie - MLB.com
2012	Brad Evans - Yahoo	Steve Moyer - Baseball Info Solutions	Jonah Keri - Grantland and Ray Murphy - Baseball HQ (tie)
2011	Chris Liss - Rotowire	Doug Dennis - Baseball HQ	
2010	Steve Gardner - USA TODAY	Clay Davenport - Baseball Prospectus	
2009	Jason Grey - ESPN	Derek Carty - The Hardball Times	
2008	Jonah Keri - ESPN	Tristan Cockcroft - ESPN	
2007	Rick Wolf/Glenn Colton - Rotoworld	Clay Davenport - Baseball Prospectus	
2006	Jonah Keri - Baseball Prospectus	Bob Radomski - Sandlot Shrink	
2005	Jason Grey - Mastersball.com	Trevor Braunig, CDM contest winner	
2004	Michael McMahon - Baseball HQ	Steve Yoder - Baseball HQ	
2003	Rick Wolf/Glenn Colton - Rotoworld	Mark Allen - amateur player	
2002	Rick Wolf/Glenn Colton - Rotoworld	Tristan Cockcroft - CBS Sports	
2001	Jonathan Mayo - MLB.com	Ron Shandler - Baseball HQ	
2000	Michael Brown - amateur player	Greg Faulkner - Owner’s Box	
1999	Michael Brown/Malek Shubair - amateur players	John Hunt - Baseball Weekly	
1998	Gene McCaffrey/John Menna - Wise Guy Baseball	Keith Law - Baseball Prospectus	
1997	Bill Kulik - Forever Baseball	John Hunt - Baseball Weekly	
1996	Lenny Melnick/Irwin Zwilling - Rotisserie Sports Hour	Steve Moyer - Stats Inc. and John Hunt - Baseball Weekly (tie)	
1995	Lenny Melnick/Irwin Zwilling - Rotisserie Sports Hour	Mike Vogel - USA Stats	
1994	Larry Labadini - Fantasy Baseball Scouting Report	John Hunt - Baseball Weekly	
