= Scotty Stirling =

American sports executive and a sportswriter

Gordon "Scotty" Stirling (July 6, 1929 – November 11, 2015) was an American sports executive and a sportswriter. He was a longtime executive and scout in the National Basketball Association (NBA), including 27 years with the Sacramento Kings. In addition to roles with the Golden State Warriors and the New York Knicks, Stirling was the NBA's vice president of basketball operations.

Stirling began his career as a reporter with the Oakland Tribune. He later became the public relations director with the Oakland Raiders of the American Football League (AFL) in January 1964 and the Oakland Oaks in the American Basketball Association (ABA). He was also the color analyst for Bill King on Raiders radio broadcasts.

Stirling is also credited with being one of the pioneers of fantasy football, helping to invent the concept in the 1960s. He later regretted not copyrighting the idea.
