= Regis Cordic =

American actor (1926–1999)

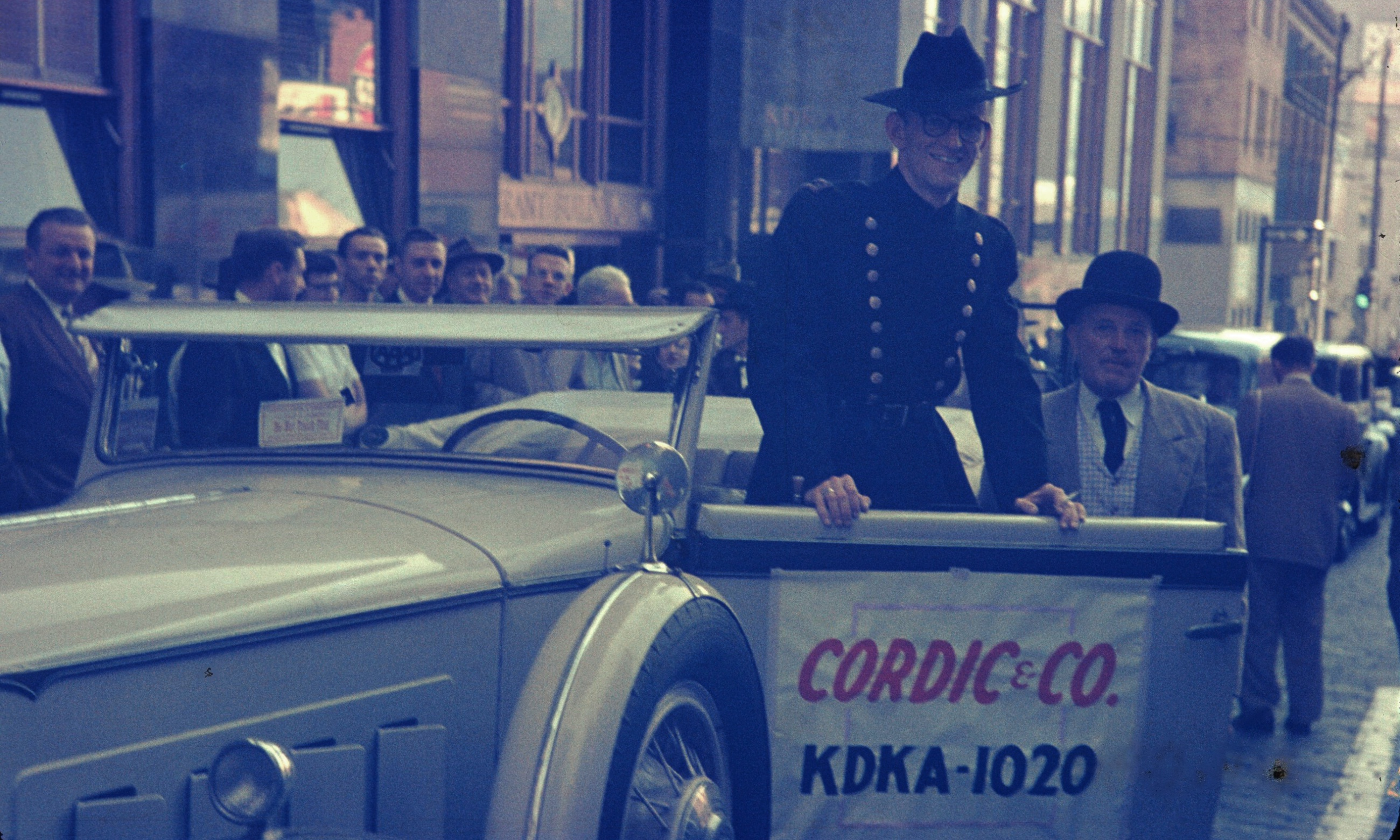
- Regis Cordic (standing in uniform) outside KDKA studio in Pittsburgh, early 1950s
- Born: Regis John Cordic; May 15, 1926; Pittsburgh, Pennsylvania, U.S.
- Died: April 16, 1999 (aged 72); Los Angeles, California, U.S.
- Other name: Rege Cordic
- Occupations: Actor, radio personality
- Years active: 1948–1999

Regis John Cordic (May 15, 1926 – April 16, 1999) was an American radio personality and actor, also known and credited as Rege Cordic.

His career in entertainment was divided roughly in half. From 1948 to 1965, he was the dominant morning drive-time radio host in Pittsburgh, Pennsylvania. From the late 1950s to the mid-1980s, he was a successful voice, television, and film actor in Los Angeles, California.

== Radio career ==
Cordic was born in the Hazelwood neighborhood of Pittsburgh and attended Central Catholic High School. He started in radio as a staff announcer and substitute sportscaster at WWSW-AM. When morning host Davey Tyson left the station in 1948, Cordic was one of a number of staffers given the opportunity to replace him. At first a straightforward announcer, Cordic began introducing comedy to his program—first in subtle ways, such as reading a sports score for "East Overshoe University" along with the real scores, and later by adding a repertory company of supporting comic characters. The morning show, renamed Cordic & Company, became the most popular in Pittsburgh.

In 1954, Cordic & Company moved to KDKA (AM) on Labor Day, one of the first times that an American radio station had hired a major personality directly from a local competitor. Popular Bette Smiley had decided to retire from her full-time KDKA wake-up show Radio Gift Shoppe of the Air and move to a Sunday-only condensed version on WCAE in August 1954 in order to raise her young son Robbie. Cordic's immediate predecessor in the morning slot was the Ed and Rainbow show, featuring Ed Schaughency with Elmer Waltman cast in the role of Rainbow, the janitor. Waltman was dropped, and Schaughency was moved to the afternoon with a show called Schaughency's Record Cabinet. Schaughency lasted less than two years in that role before he was replaced by Art Pallan, who also came over from WWSW. Schaughency took on a new role as a news reader and moved back to mornings, delivering the newscasts during Cordic & Company. The show's ratings continued to grow until, at some points, it had an 85 share—meaning that 85% of all radios in Pittsburgh were tuned to Cordic & Company while it was on. By the end of his tenure in Pittsburgh, Cordic was reportedly earning $100,000 a year, a huge sum for a radio host at the time.

=== Olde Frothingslosh ===
One of Cordic's most memorable running gags at both WWSW and KDKA were fake advertisements for "Olde Frothingslosh", "the pale stale ale with the foam on the bottom." This beer was supposedly brewed by Sir Reginald Frothingslosh at Upper Crudney-on-the-Thames. In 1955, Pittsburgh Brewing Company began issuing special Christmas-season cans and bottles of Olde Frothingslosh filled with real beer.

Since the Cordic ad read "The foam is on the bottom", the bottles and cans were packed upside down in the cases. The humorous labels changed every year and became favorites of collectors. The brewery (as well as a few other small local Pittsburgh breweries such as Tech Beer) released new editions of Olde Frothingslosh even after Cordic left Pittsburgh, continuing until 1982 and then reviving the brand in 1998, and more recently in 2007 (currently available).

=== Other products advertised on the show ===
Cordic advertised a wide variety of whimsical products on the show, including the Crudley white liner (an automobile that was only 18 inches (460 mm) wide, designed to drive on the white line that divided highways), Mediocre cigarettes in a crush-proof package made of stainless steel, and Cordoco Gasoline (it prevents undependable gas gauge problems by compressing ten gallons into nine). Another product was a book of sports misinformation, so one could memorize the alleged facts and win bar bets using the book as proof. Cordic also produced a short-lived radio show composed of simulated baseball games, based on a 1620 computer program developed by John Burgeson of the IBM Corporation.

=== Regulars on the show ===
Two characters who visited Cordic regularly on the show were Omicron and his girlfriend Matildacron, who were aliens from Venus. Sometimes he was accompanied by Noodnicron who was from Jupiter. After arriving noisily in their flying saucer, Cordic usually had to explain something about humans that puzzled them. Noodnicron was apparently shaped like a billiard ball, as in one famous skit he was injured while resting on a large green field when suddenly Earth people began to poke him with long sticks and shooting deaf and dumb Jovians at him. Omicron reportedly helped finish drilling the Fort Pitt tunnel by accidentally flying his saucer through it when incomplete and crashing into the unfinished section and out the other side. Cordic recorded a children's record featuring Omicron and Noodnicron called "Omicron and the Sputnik" which was, in turn adapted into a cartoon by Mel-O-Toons.

Brunhilda, a spectacularly overweight but jolly young woman with a heavy Western Pennsylvania accent, was also a regular. When she arrived, listeners would hear booming footsteps followed by the opening of the freight door (because she could not fit through the regular doors). Cordic called her "Bruny" and she called him "Chub", although he was a very thin man. Another frequent guest was Carmen Monoxide, known for his bad jokes and puns. In one episode, Carmen runs afoul of Milove, the resident cow. Milove and Milk, the milkman who collected her milk, often had run-ins over whether he was milking another cow. Mr. Goat was also present in the audience and often became offended when he was rudely pushed aside so that Bruny could get to her seat. Much of the material mentioned here and more can be heard at the official Cordic web site including some memorable moments on the radio and some of the ads printed locally in Pittsburgh.

Cordic had a creative team who wrote many of the routines and provided the voices for their characters. Although the cast changed over the years, the main contributors were Sterling Yates, Karl Hardman, Bob Trow, and Charlie Sords. Advertising man Bob McCully wrote for the show, but was not a performer. Hardman's long-time partner, Marilyn Eastman, also contributed as a writer and voice actor.

== Personal life ==
He was in a relationship with voice actress Joan Gerber.

== Move to Los Angeles ==
In 1965, CBS Radio offered Cordic the morning drive-time spot at KNX (AM) in Los Angeles. The spot was being vacated by Bob Crane, who was leaving radio to star in Hogan's Heroes. Cordic accepted the offer in July 1965, but KDKA owner Westinghouse Broadcasting Corporation refused to release Cordic from his contract until it ended in November 1965. KNX's morning ratings dropped precipitously during the four months that the show had no permanent host. They improved somewhat when Cordic arrived, but not enough to offset the drop, and the station switched to an all-news format after 18 months with Cordic as the morning host. The flair for Pittsburgh-centered satire, it seems, was difficult for Cordic to import to the more sophisticated Los Angeles radio market, despite the successes of similar personalities like Jim Hawthorne.

While he lived in Los Angeles, Cordic regularly flew back to Pittsburgh to tape segments for WTAE-TV's Sunday Afternoon Movie, giving detailed background information about the films presented.

Cordic, still being paid for the remaining time under his KNX contract, studied acting, and began to get television roles. He first appeared on television in The Monkees in 1967 and The Flying Nun in 1968. He had small parts in a few films, but was primarily a television actor. Over the years, he appeared several times on Gunsmoke, and also had roles in Kung Fu, Nichols, Columbo, The Rockford Files, Barnaby Jones, The Waltons, and McCloud, among many others.

From the late 1970s until 1991, he was heard in cartoon voice roles, starting with The Scooby-Doo/Dynomutt Hour in 1976, and also including Jabberjaw, Spider-Man, The Incredible Hulk, Transformers, and a voice part in the 1977 animated film The Mouse and His Child. Cordic had an uncredited part as a featured party guest in Woody Allen's 1973 movie, Sleeper.

Cordic returned to morning radio for a brief time in late 1981, taking over at oldies station KRLA/Pasadena. He signed on for a year, but left the job after just four months. He spent the rest of his career doing voice-over work, lending his voice to many national commercials.

Cordic died in Los Angeles of brain cancer in 1999, one month short of his 73rd birthday. He was buried in Glendale's Forest Lawn Memorial Park Cemetery.

== Filmography ==
Year	Title	Role	Notes
1960	Omicron and the Sputnik	Narrator/Omicron/Noodnicron	Voice
1967–1968	The Monkees	Doctor, Narrator, Town Crier	2 episodes
1970	R. P. M.	Minor Role	Uncredited
1971	The Seven Minutes	Louis Polk	
1973	Extreme Close-Up		
1973	Detroit 9000		
1973	Sleeper	Party Guest	Uncredited
1973	Emergency!	Patient	Season 2, Episode 20; "Rip-Off"
1974	The Mary Tyler Moore Show	Marc Williams	Season 4, Episode 16; "WJM Tries Harder"
1974	Newman's Law	Clement	
1975	The Wild Party	Mr. Murchison	
1976	Obsession	Newscaster	
1977	The Mouse and His Child	The Clock	Voice
1977	Telefon	Doctor	
1977	John Hus	Cardinal Anthony	
1979	Americathon	Herb	
1986	The Transformers: The Movie	Quintesson Judge	Voice

Kolchak nightstalker, TV show

== Sources ==
- Mehno, John (1999-11-21). "Doggone right: Cordic & Co.'s inspired lunacy tied up region's tunnels and airwaves". Pittsburgh Tribune-Review. Archived from the original on February 10, 2006.
