= ESPN Super Selector =

Super Selector was a fantasy cricket game that is run by ESPN Star Sports. It was conceptualised by Manu Sawhney and Anurag Dahiya as a means for attracting more viewer attention to non-India cricket, and produced for TV by Joy Bhattacharjya. Contests ranged from a month to the duration of an entire series.

The concept involves picking a team of 11 players within a fixed budget. A set number of substitutions are allowed throughout the tournament. Points are awarded based on players' performances on the field. There are many other factors to consider before making a team.

Players also have the ability to form mini-leagues with their friends.

== Popularity ==
Super Selector is popular in Asia, primarily the Indian subcontinent, and has set world records in online participation. During the 2003 Cricket World Cup in South Africa, over 500,000 contestants battled it out to be the Super Selector.

The popularity of Super Selector in India saw the launching of clones on BBC and Sky Television in Britain, and on Cricinfo.com, cricket's most popular web portal. During the 2003 World Cup, the Super Selector website remained inaccessible for long periods because it was overloaded with high traffic.

The contest even had its own daily TV show, hosted by popular Bollywood actor Naseeruddin Shah.

== Prizes ==
The grand prizes offered to Super Selector winners have included trips abroad to watch live cricket games. These winners are featured on ESPN to talk about their experiences. Prizes are also offered to 'daily' and 'weekly' winners. These include cash prizes, home appliances, or official merchandise.
