= John Burgeson =

German politician (1931 - 2016)

John W. Burgeson (19 August 1931 – 12 September 2016) was an IBM engineer who created the first computer baseball simulation game in 1961, on an IBM 1620 Computer in Akron, Ohio. Burgeson's invention was accepted and officially recognized by the National Baseball Hall of Fame in contribution.

A baseball fan and long-time member of SABR, Burgeson initially wrote the program on his own time for enjoyment. He shared the program with the company, and they included it as part of the IBM 1620 program library, for which it was the only game. The game was run by placing a deck of punch cards into a card reader, which in turn read them into the computer's memory. Users would pick a lineup from a roster of 50 players, the computer would pick its lineup from the remaining list and the simulation game was then played to completion based on the statistical probabilities for each batter and pitcher.

In 1961, a radio DJ at KDKA in Pittsburgh, Rege Cordic, read three of Burgeson's printed play-by-play game results on the air in a re-creation of the fictional games.

On September 12, 2016, at the age of 85, John W. Burgeson died. He is survived by his wife, eight children, twelve grandchildren, and five great grandchildren.

John W. Burgeson's Personal Website
