= Fantasy sport =

Imaginary sport teams ownership game

A fantasy sport (also known less commonly as rotisserie or roto) is a game, often played using the internet, where participants assemble imaginary or virtual teams composed of proxies of real players of a professional sport. These teams compete based on the statistical performance of those players in actual games. This performance is converted into points that are compiled and totaled according to a roster selected by each fantasy team's manager. These point systems can be simple enough to be manually calculated by a "league commissioner" who coordinates and manages the overall league, or points can be compiled and calculated using computers tracking actual results of the professional sport. In fantasy sports, as in real sports, team owners draft, trade, and cut (drop) players.

== History ==
=== Early simulations ===
The history of fantasy games can be traced to the 19th century. The tabletop game Sebring Parlor Base Ball, introduced in 1866, allowed participants to simulate games by propelling a coin into slots on a wooden board. Later games featured outcomes determined by dice rolls or spinners. In 1930, Clifford Van Beek designed the board game National Pastime, which contained customized baseball cards of Major League Baseball (MLB) players.

An example of such games was APBA, which was first released in 1951 and also contained cards of MLB players with in-game outcomes correlated to their stats from past seasons. Participants could compose fantasy teams from the cards and play against each other or recreate previous seasons using the statistics on the cards. Individual player cards and dice roll simulations were also emulated in the Strat-O-Matic game, which was first released in 1961. Daniel Okrent, who would later be credited with developing modern fantasy baseball, was an avid Strat-O-Matic player, telling Sports Illustrated in 2011 that "if there hadn't been Strat-O-Matic, I still think I would have come up with rotisserie, but unquestionably it helped."

In 1961, another early form of fantasy baseball was coded for the IBM 1620 computer by John Burgeson, then working for IBM. A user would select a team from a limited roster of retired players to play against a team randomly chosen by the computer. The computer would then use random number generation and player statistics to simulate a game's outcome and print a play-by-play description of it.

While some of these fantasy games produced outcomes based on the performances of real athletes, they were not designed to be played out over the course of a season, nor did they take current statistics into account, relying instead on those from previous years.

=== The first leagues ===
In the 1950s, Oakland, California businessman and future limited partner in the Oakland Raiders Wilfred "Bill" Winkenbach developed a fantasy golf game in which participants would select a roster of professional golfers and compare their scores at the end of a given tournament, with the lowest combined total of strokes winning. He also created a baseball game in which players drafted hitters and pitchers, comparing their real-life statistics against each other. These early experiments, however, failed to spread to the general public.

In 1960, sociologist William A. Gamson developed the Baseball Seminar league, in which participants would draft rosters of active MLB players and compare results at the end of the season based on the players' final batting averages, earned run averages, runs batted in, and win totals. Gamson would go on to play the game as a professor at the University of Michigan, where another competitor was Bob Sklar. One of Sklar's students was Daniel Okrent. According to Alan Schwarz's The Numbers Game: Baseball’s Lifelong Fascination with Statistics, Sklar told Okrent about the Baseball Seminar league.

Two years later, in a New York City hotel room during a 1962 Raiders cross-country trip, Winkenbach, along with Raiders public relations employee Bill Tunnel and Oakland Tribune reporter Scotty Stirling, developed the rules that would eventually be the basis of modern fantasy football. The inaugural league was called the Greater Oakland Professional Pigskin Prognosticators League (GOPPPL), and the first draft took place at Winkenbach's home in Oakland in August 1963. One of the league's original members, Andy Mousalimas, owned a sports bar in Oakland called the King's X, where the first public fantasy football league was founded in 1969. The idea spread by word of mouth when the patrons of other Bay Area bars visited the King's X for trivia contests.

=== Rotisserie League Baseball ===
Modern fantasy baseball was developed and popularized in the 1980s by a group of journalists who created Rotisserie League Baseball in 1980. The league was named after the New York City restaurant La Rotisserie Française, where its founders met for lunch and first played the game. Magazine writer-editor Daniel Okrent is credited with introducing the rotisserie league concept to the group and inventing the scoring system. Players in the Rotisserie League drafted teams of active MLB players and tracked their statistics during the season to compile their scores. Like the Baseball Seminar league, rather than using statistics for seasons whose outcomes were already known to simulate in-game outcomes, team owners would have to make predictions about the statistics that MLB players would accumulate during the upcoming season.

Rotisserie baseball, nicknamed roto, proved to be popular despite the difficulties of compiling statistics by hand, which was an early drawback to participation. Okrent credits the idea's rapid spread to the fact that the initial league was created by sports journalists, telling Vanity Fair in 2008 that "most of us in the league were in the media, and we got a lot of press coverage that first season. The second season, there were rotisserie leagues in every Major League press box." According to Okrent, rotisserie baseball afforded sportswriters the opportunity to write about baseball-related material during the 1981 Major League Baseball strike, saying "the writers who were covering baseball had nothing to write about, so they began writing about the teams they had assembled in their own leagues. And that was what popularized it and spread it around very, very widely."

=== Growth and early participants ===
Before the advent of the Internet, fantasy sports grew through print publications, such as magazines and newspapers. In 1987, Fantasy Football Index, the first national magazine dedicated to fantasy football, was launched by Ian Allan and Bruce Taylor.

In the late 1980s and early 1990s, the company Phoneworks created nationwide fantasy games for a variety of sports, launching them in a variety of newspapers across the United States. Players chose their teams by calling a toll-free phone number and entering four-digit codes for each of their player selections. The games served as an early version of today's daily fantasy sports by rewarding each week's highest-scoring participants with prizes.

In 1993, the magazine Fantasy Football Weekly was launched. Also that year, USA Today added a weekly fantasy baseball columnist, John Hunt. Hunt started a league among sports personalities called the League of Alternate Baseball Reality, which first included Peter Gammons, Keith Olbermann and Bill James, among others.

=== Internet expansion ===
The growth of the Internet during the 1990s brought a "broad demographic shift in fantasy sports participation" because it enabled fantasy sports participants to instantaneously download tabulated statistics, rather than having to search for box scores of individual games in newspapers and keep track of cumulative statistics on paper.

In 1995, ESPN launched its first entirely Internet-based fantasy baseball game, with other major sports and entertainment companies following suit in the ensuing years. In October of that year, a fantasy hockey website was released by Molson Breweries as part of the company's "I am Online" marketing strategy centered around its I am Canadian advertising campaign. The site focused on music, entertainment and hockey in general in addition to fantasy competitions. It allowed users to register accounts and participate in fantasy leagues of nine teams. The site included updates of National Hockey League (NHL) statistics and provided content from the Hockey Hall of Fame.

CBS Sports began offering fantasy football leagues in 1997, the same year that the fantasy news website now known as RotoWire was launched. In July 1999, Yahoo began offering its fantasy football product for free, a decision that gave the site an advantage over its competitors. The creators of Fantasy Football Weekly launched Fanball.com later that year. While some sites abandoned a paid model in the wake of Yahoo's decision, some smaller sites, such as RotoWire, began offering paid products as they started losing business to larger competitors. CBS, which had transitioned to a free model for its league commissioner services, switched back to a paid model before the 2002 MLB season.

A trade group for the industry, the Fantasy Sports Trade Association, was formed in 1998. Now known as the Fantasy Sports & Gaming Association (FSGA), the organization estimates that in 2003, there were 15.2 million fantasy sports players in the United States and Canada.

During the first decade of the 2000s, fantasy sports started to become a mainstream hobby. In 2002, the National Football League (NFL) found that while the average male surveyed on its website spent 6.6 hours a week watching the league on television, fantasy players surveyed said they watched 8.4 hours of NFL football per week. "This is the first time we've been able to demonstrate specifically that fantasy play drives TV viewing," said Chris Russo, the NFL's senior vice president at the time. As a result of the survey's findings, the league made fantasy offerings more prominent on its website and produced television ads for fantasy football featuring active players. Prior to these developments, fantasy sports were largely viewed negatively by major sports leagues, with Russo later recalling that "there were concerns about whether it would be right for the fans or could it be construed as gambling." However, leagues began to embrace fantasy sports as their value towards increasing fans' consumption of sports became more evident.

==== Daily fantasy sports ====
Daily fantasy sports are accelerated versions of the traditional fantasy format in which contests are conducted over shorter periods than a full season, often lasting one week or even a single day. Daily fantasy games are typically subject to an entry fee, a portion of which funds a prize pool that is distributed among the game's winner or winners.

In June 2007, Fantasy Sports Live, one of the first daily fantasy sites, was launched. In November 2008, NBC launched a daily fantasy site called SnapDraft, and FanDuel was founded in 2009 as a spin-off of a Scottish prediction market company. DraftKings was founded in 2012.

Following venture capital investments from various firms, including from professional sports leagues such as MLB and the National Basketball Association (NBA), DraftKings and FanDuel launched an aggressive marketing campaign prior to the 2015 NFL season. At its peak, the two companies collectively ran an ad on national television in the United States once every 90 seconds. In addition to receiving direct investments from sports leagues, the two companies have reached sponsorship deals with several leagues and teams. In November 2014, DraftKings entered into a multi-year sponsorship deal with the NHL. In April 2015, after the NFL began to allow daily fantasy providers to sign multi-year team sponsorship deals, FanDuel reached deals with sixteen teams for placements on team-oriented digital properties, radio broadcasts, and within their stadiums. DraftKings has also received investments from Jerry Jones and Robert Kraft, who own the Dallas Cowboys and New England Patriots, respectively.

The legality of daily fantasy sports has been questioned, with critics arguing that it more closely resembles proposition wagering on athlete performance than a traditional fantasy sports game. However, following the 2018 United States Supreme Court decision in Murphy v. National Collegiate Athletic Association, which allowed states to legalize sports betting, questions surrounding the legality of daily fantasy sports, as well as fantasy sports in general, within the United States have largely been settled. (Note: As of July 2025, sports betting is legal in 46 US states, while daily fantasy sports sites operate in 45 states.) Montana is the only US state to officially ban online fantasy sports. (Note: Louisiana and Arizona, states with bans previously not explicitly outlined by law, launched online fantasy offerings in their states in 2021.)

== Industry overview ==
=== Size of the industry ===
In May 2015, Australian market research firm IBISWorld reported that fantasy sports comprised a $2 billion industry in the United States, experiencing 10.7% annual growth and employing 4,386 people in 292 businesses.

According to the Fantasy Sports Trade Association, in 2017, the size of the fantasy sports industry reached $7.22 billion, per research by Ipsos. The study estimated that there were 59.3 million fantasy sports players in the United States and Canada as of that year.

=== Industry growth ===
The Fantasy Sports & Gaming Association estimates that the number of fantasy sports players in the US and Canada grew from 500,000 in 1988 to 15.2 million in 2003, declining slightly over the next few years before growing to 29.9 million in 2008 and 62.5 million in 2022. In 2015, Forbes estimated that the number of yearly non-betting fantasy sports users had grown 25% since 2011. This growth encouraged hundreds of millions of dollars in investments into emerging daily fantasy sports leagues, such as FanDuel and DraftKings.

Outside of North America, the fantasy industry has also experienced a recent period of growth. The development of daily fantasy sports has encouraged growth in European markets. ESPN Super Selector launched in 2001 for fantasy cricket and had 500,000 users during the 2003 Cricket World Cup. By 2017, there were 40 million fantasy sports players in India. In 2019, the number had grown to 90 million, and in 2020, an estimated 100 million Indians participated in fantasy sports. The market leader in fantasy sports in India, Dream11, signed a four-year sponsorship deal for the IPL in 2019.

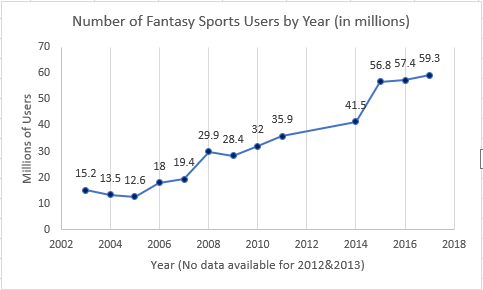

=== Trade associations ===
The Fantasy Sports Trade Association was formed in 1998 to represent the growing industry in the United States and Canada. Now known as the Fantasy Sports & Gaming Association, the organization aims to support fantasy sports, sports gambling in general, and its associated businesses and participants.

The Fantasy Sports Writers Association was formed in 2004 to represent the growing numbers of journalists covering fantasy sports exclusively. The Fantasy Sports Association was formed in 2006 as a rival trade group. However, the organization folded in 2010.

=== Demographics ===
According to the Fantasy Sports & Gaming Association (FSGA), an estimated 62.5 million people played fantasy sports in the US and Canada in 2022. The FSGA estimated that 19% of American adults played fantasy sports in 2023, compared to 13% in 2014. A 2023 FSGA survey found that 64% of fantasy sports players were male, 48% were between the ages of 18 and 34, and 84% had a college degree or higher. A 2015 analysis found that 89.8% were white and 51.5% were unmarried.

According to the FSGA, the most popular fantasy sport in the US and Canada is gridiron football, which is played by approximately 79% of fantasy participants. The next most popular sports are basketball (32%), baseball (22%), ice hockey (12%), association football (11%), and college football (11%).

Research has shown that fantasy players are also generally stronger consumers of alcoholic beverages, fast food, airline travel, video games, sports periodicals, athletic shoes, and cell phones relative to the general population. The FSGA reported in 2019 that fantasy players were also far more likely to use Instagram or Snapchat, visit a sports bar, and get food delivered than the general population.

=== Fantasy sports television programming ===
Due to the popularity of fantasy sports, major sports networks such as ESPN, NFL Network, and Fox Sports have created dedicated weekly fantasy programming to analyze player performance and predict outcomes in relation to particular scoring systems. ESPN's on-demand streaming platform ESPN+ offers a fantasy program called The Fantasy Show hosted by long time staff writer Matthew Berry. The Fantasy Show utilizes puppets and comedy to present statistical information about NFL players. ESPN also aires a show on Sunday mornings during the NFL season called Fantasy Football Now. "Fantasy Football Now" airs live on Sunday mornings during the NFL season, a time when fans are making last-minute roster moves and need the latest news from around the league. Providing the latest info are analysts Matthew Berry, Field Yates and licensed physical therapist Stephania Bell, who gives injury updates.

NFL Network aires NFL Fantasy Live as an hour long program containing a consistent weekly segment list that viewers can count on to help them manage their team. NFL Fantasy Live is hosted by Cole Wright and features Michael Fabiano, Adam Rank, Marcas Grant, Akbar Gbaja-Biamila, Graham Barfield and statistics analytics expert Cynthia Frelund. Fox Sports Net aires Fantasy Football Hour on a weekly basis during the NFL season hosted by Katy Winge and features industry experts Brad Evans and Nate Lundy.

== Legal issues in the United States ==
Fantasy sports are generally considered to be a form of gambling, though they are far less strictly regulated than other forms of sports betting. Unlike traditional sports betting, fantasy sports are generally viewed as "games of skill," rather than "games of chance," thus exempting them from gambling bans and regulations in many jurisdictions.

=== Federal law related to fantasy gaming ===
The Unlawful Internet Gambling Enforcement Act of 2006 (UIGEA), was enacted as part of the "American Values Agenda" of 2006 and was added as an amendment to the unrelated SAFE Port Act. The UIGEA generally prohibits funds transfers to businesses engaged in unlawful internet wagering. However the UIGEA does not itself define unlawful internet wagering, and expressly refrains from altering the legality of any underlying conduct other than funds transfers.

While the act does not alter the legality of any particular activity permitted or prohibited under other laws, it does contain some express exemptions to its funds transfer prohibitions. One of these exemptions from the UIGEA prohibitions is for fantasy sports that meet certain criteria. Specifically, fantasy sports that are based on teams of real multiple athletes from multiple real world teams, that have prizes established before the event starts, that use the skill of participants to determine the outcome, are exempted from the definition of a bet or wager that is the basis for requiring banks to identify and block funds transfers. According to Congressman Jim Leach, an author of the UIGEA, exemptions, particularly one for fantasy sports, were included to relieve the burden of enforcement on banks and the UIGEA does not make fantasy sports legal.

Because the UIGEA exempted fantasy sports from its definition of a bet or wager, there is a misconception that fantasy sports were made legal by the UIGEA. However the UIGEA is not a criminal gambling statute, and it specifically does not alter any criminal gambling laws and thus does not make fantasy sports legal. Federal criminal gambling statutes are found in Title 18 of U.S. Code, such as the Federal Wire Act 18 U.S. Code § 1084 (which prohibits interstate sports wagering) and the Illegal Gambling Business Act 18 U.S. Code § 1955 (which prohibits the interstate conduct of wagering activity prohibited under state law). By contrast, the UIGEA is found in Title 31 with other anti-money laundering and financial crimes statutes.

=== State laws related to fantasy gaming ===
Whether state laws can regulate fantasy sports conducted across state lines depends on whether fantasy sports are a form of sports wagering under federal law. This is because the Federal Wire Act prohibits the conduct of sports wagering in interstate or foreign commerce. With regard to intrastate sports wagering, in 2018 the United States Supreme Court in Murphy v. National Collegiate Athletic Association struck down the Professional and Amateur Sports Protection Act of 1992 (PASPA), which had prohibited states from authorizing any wagering, lottery, betting, sweepstakes or other wagering scheme that is based directly or indirectly on games in which professional or amateur athletes participate or on the performance of any athletes in such games.

Where states have not expressly authorized fantasy sports contests, usually general gambling laws prohibit lotteries or wagering if three elements are present: an entry fee (known as "consideration"), a prize (a "reward," in legal terms) and chance. Whether fantasy sports are legal under these laws hinges on the definition of "chance" that the state applies. For some states, if skill dominates the outcome of the event, then the contest is legal, and passes what is called the "dominant factor test." Other states with a stricter definition of chance, called "any chance test," have made fantasy football illegal.

Several states have clarified that paid fantasy sports contests are games of skill and exempt from gambling laws, beginning with Maryland in 2012.

One exception is the state of Nevada, which was exempted from PASPA. The Nevada attorney general issued an opinion that found Daily Fantasy Sports to be a form of sports wagering, similar to the current wagering offered by Nevada Sports Books. The opinions states that Daily Fantasy Sports are not illegal in Nevada; however, a sports pool license is required to conduct the activity in Nevada.

Several Attorneys General have also issued opinions that Daily Fantasy Sports are a form of sports wagering. A Florida state attorney general's opinion in 1991 called into doubt the legality of fantasy football contests, but companies have operated in the state without any legal action. Since then nine other AGs have issued options, statements or formal opinions that equate DFS with gambling.

However, several other Attorneys General have issued opinions that DFS are legal games of skill. In August 2015 in Kansas, due to uncertainty with the state's Racing and Gaming Commission position, the state's attorney general issued an opinion that daily fantasy sports was a skill game and thus permitted under state law. Kansas Gov. Sam Brownback signed legislation a month later authorizing fantasy gaming. The Attorneys General of West Virginia and Rhode Island have also issued opinions that clarified the legality of DFS and paid fantasy sports.

As of July 2025, online fantasy sports are legal in 49 of the 50 US states. The only state with a ban on online fantasy sports that is codified in statute is Montana. As of July 2025, daily fantasy sports sites operate in 45 US states.

=== Legal cases related to use of player statistics ===
There have been other legal cases involving fantasy sports and the use of professional athletes' statistics for purposes of scoring.

==== STATS, Inc. vs. NBA ====
In 1996, STATS, Inc., a major statistical provider to fantasy sports companies, won a court case, along with Motorola, on appeal against the NBA in which the NBA was trying to stop STATS from distributing in game score information via a special wireless device created by Motorola. The victory played a large part in defending other cases where sports leagues have tried to suppress live in-game information from their events being distributed by other outlets. The victory also accelerated the demand for real-time statistics amid the growth of the fantasy sports industry.

==== CDM vs. MLBAM ====
The development of fantasy sports produced tension between fantasy sports companies and professional leagues and players associations over the rights to player profiles and statistics. The players associations of the major sports leagues believed that fantasy games using player names were subject to licensing due to the right of publicity of the players involved. Since the player names were being used as a group, the players had assigned their publicity rights to the players association who then signed licensing deals. During the 1980s and 1990s many companies signed licensing deals with the player associations, but some companies did not. The issue came to a head with the lawsuit of Major League Baseball Advanced Media (MLBAM), MLB's Internet company, vs. St. Louis-based CBC Distribution and Marketing Inc., the parent company of CDM Sports. When CBC was denied a new licensing agreement with MLBAM (they had acquired the rights from the baseball players' association) for its fantasy baseball game, CBC filed suit.

CBC argued that intellectual property laws and so-called "right of publicity" laws don't apply to the statistics used in fantasy sports. The FSTA filed an amicus curiae in support of CBC, also arguing that if MLBAM won the lawsuit it would have a dramatic impact on the industry, which was largely ignored by the major sports leagues for years while a number of smaller entrepreneurs grew it into a multibillion-dollar industry, and a ruling could allow the MLBAM to have a monopoly over the industry.

"This will be a defining moment in the fantasy sports industry," said Charlie Wiegert, executive vice president of CBC. "The other leagues are all watching this case. If MLB prevailed, it just would have been a matter of time before they followed up. Their player unions are just waiting for the opportunity."

CBC won the lawsuit as US District Court Judge Mary Ann Medler ruled that statistics are part of the public domain and can be used at no cost by fantasy companies. "The names and playing records of major-league baseball players as used in CBC's fantasy games are not copyrightable," Medler wrote. "Therefore, federal copyright law does not pre-empt the players' claimed right of publicity."

The 8th Circuit Court of Appeals upheld the decision in October 2007. "It would be strange law that a person would not have a First Amendment right to use information that is available to everyone," a three-judge panel said in its ruling. The Supreme Court upheld the circuit court's decision by declining to hear the case in June 2008. In 2009, CBS Interactive won a lawsuit against the NFL Players’ Association over whether CBS had a First Amendment right to use players’ names and playing records in its fantasy sports offerings without paying licensing fees.

== Fantasy strategies ==
There are countless different approaches players can take to begin the new season to better their chances of winning the year, including watching and reading material as prep for the next year of Fantasy Sports.

== See also ==
- Esports
- Phygital sport
