= Fantasy baseball =

Virtual game to draft MLB players into teams

Fantasy baseball is a game in which the participants serve as owners and general managers of virtual baseball teams. The competitors select their rosters by participating in a draft in which all relevant Major League Baseball (MLB) players are available. Fantasy points are awarded in weekly matchups based on the actual performances of baseball players in real-world competition. The game typically involves MLB, but can also involve other leagues, such as American college baseball, or leagues in other countries, such as the KBO League.

== History ==
=== Early simulations ===
The history of fantasy baseball games can be traced back to the 19th century. The tabletop game Sebring Parlor Base Ball, introduced in 1866, allowed participants to simulate games by propelling a coin into slots on a wooden board. Later games featured outcomes determined by dice rolls or spinners, and some were endorsed by professional ballplayers. In 1930, Clifford Van Beek designed the board game National Pastime, which contained customized baseball cards of MLB players. After rolling a pair of dice, participants would consult the card of the MLB player "at bat" to determine an outcome, which could range from a single, double, triple, or home run to a strikeout, putout, walk, or error. Players with better statistics in the previous season were more likely to receive favorable outcomes; this allowed National Pastime to become one of the first games to attempt to accurately simulate the performances of real-life MLB players.

A notable example of such games was APBA, which was first released in 1951 and contained cards of MLB players with in-game outcomes correlated to their stats from past seasons. Participants could compose fantasy teams from the cards and play against each other or attempt to re-create previous seasons using the statistics on the cards. Individual player cards and dice roll simulations were also emulated in the Strat-O-Matic game, which was first released in 1961. Daniel Okrent, who would later be credited with developing modern fantasy baseball, was an avid Strat-O-Matic player, telling Sports Illustrated in 2011 that "if there hadn't been Strat-O-Matic, I still think I would have come up with rotisserie, but unquestionably it helped."

In 1960, sociologist William A. Gamson developed the Baseball Seminar league, in which participants would draft rosters of active MLB players and compare results at the end of the season based on the players' final batting averages, earned run averages, runs batted in, and win totals. Gamson would continue to play the game as a professor at the University of Michigan, where another competitor was Bob Sklar. One of Sklar's students was Daniel Okrent. According to Alan Schwarz's The Numbers Game: Baseball's Lifelong Fascination with Statistics, Sklar told Okrent about the Baseball Seminar league.

In 1961, another early form of fantasy baseball was coded for the IBM 1620 computer by John Burgeson, then working for IBM. A user would select a team from a limited roster of retired players to play against a team randomly chosen by the computer. The computer would then use random number generation and player statistics to simulate a game's outcome and print a play-by-play description of it. The game was coded for a computer with only 20 KB of computer memory and was entirely self-contained. In the fall of 1961, Rege Cordic, a KDKA (Pittsburgh) radio personality, produced a radio show based on the program.

=== Rotisserie League Baseball ===
Modern fantasy baseball was developed and popularized in the 1980s by a group of journalists who created Rotisserie League Baseball in 1980. The league was named after the New York City restaurant La Rotisserie Française, where its founders met for lunch and first played the game. Magazine writer-editor Daniel Okrent is credited with introducing the rotisserie league concept to the group and inventing the scoring system. Players in the Rotisserie League drafted teams of active MLB players and tracked their statistics during the season to compile their scores. Like the Baseball Seminar league, rather than using statistics for seasons whose outcomes were already known to simulate in-game outcomes, team owners would have to make predictions about the statistics that MLB players would accumulate during the upcoming season. The success or failure of a particular fantasy team would therefore depend on the real-life performance of its players rather than the results of a simulation.

Rotisserie baseball, nicknamed roto, proved to be popular despite the difficulties of compiling statistics by hand, which was an early drawback to participation. The traditional statistics used in early rotisserie leagues were often chosen because they were easy to compile from newspaper box scores or weekly information published in USA Today. Okrent credits the idea's rapid spread to the fact that the initial league was created by sports journalists, telling Vanity Fair in 2008 that "most of us in the league were in the media, and we got a lot of press coverage that first season. The second season, there were rotisserie leagues in every Major League press box." According to Okrent, rotisserie baseball afforded sportswriters the opportunity to write about baseball-related material during the 1981 Major League Baseball strike, saying "the writers who were covering baseball had nothing to write about, so they began writing about the teams they had assembled in their own leagues. And that was what popularized it and spread it around very, very widely."

=== Continued expansion ===
In 1985, the Grandstand Sports Services launched the first nationally available rotisserie baseball leagues online through Q-Link (later America Online). Between 1985 and 1996, the Grandstand continued to improve on the game and the technology by being the first to offer automated drafting, real-time scoring, real-time trading and transactions, and continuous leagues.

A national fantasy baseball game, Dugout Derby, was developed by Robert Barbiere and Brad Wendkos in collaboration with the company Phoneworks as a telephone-based fantasy sports promotion. The game launched in 1989 in a number of newspapers throughout the United States, including the Hartford Courant, the Los Angeles Times, the Philadelphia Inquirer, and the Tampa Bay Times. Players selected their teams by calling a toll-free phone number and entering four-digit codes for each of their choices. Dugout Derby is considered an early predecessor to modern daily fantasy sports, awarding weekly vacation packages to top-scoring participants. Its success led to the creation of similar fantasy contests for other sports.

The growth of the Internet during the 1990s brought a "broad demographic shift in fantasy sports participation" because it enabled fantasy sports participants to instantaneously download tabulated statistics, rather than having to search for box scores of individual games in newspapers and keep track of cumulative statistics on paper. In 1995, ESPN launched its first entirely Internet-based fantasy baseball game, with other major sports and entertainment companies following suit in the ensuing years. In the early 1990s, estimates of total fantasy sports participation in the United States and Canada ranged from 1 to 3 million; by 2003, the number of players had grown to 15.2 million.

Daily fantasy sports are accelerated versions of the traditional fantasy format in which contests are conducted over shorter periods than a full season, often lasting one week or even a single day. The first major daily fantasy sports company, FanDuel, was founded in 2009 as a spin-off of a Scottish prediction market company. DraftKings, now the other major daily fantasy firm, was founded in 2012. In April 2013, MLB invested an undisclosed amount in DraftKings, making it the first professional sports organization in the United States to invest in daily fantasy sports. In 2015, DraftKings became the official daily fantasy game of MLB, a move that Business Wire called "the most comprehensive league partnership in daily fantasy sports history" at the time.

As of 2022, an estimated 62.5 million people played fantasy sports in the United States and Canada, per the Fantasy Sports & Gaming Association, and around one out of five fantasy participants played fantasy baseball.

== League types ==
A fantasy baseball league may be organized in a variety of ways. The original rotisserie leagues, as well as their modern counterparts, rank each team in a number of statistical categories at the end of the season. Points are then awarded based on these rankings. For example, in an eight-team league, the team that collectively hits the most home runs might earn eight points, the team that hits the second most might earn seven, and so on. The number of statistics for which the teams are ranked may vary (see Competition variations). Another common format is head-to-head competition, in which each team only competes against one other team in a given week. At the end of the week, the winner of each matchup may be determined in a variety of ways (see Head-to-head variations). In addition to scoring variations, league organization may also differ based on the structure of each team's roster (see Roster variations).

=== Competition variations ===
The original Rotisserie League Baseball used the following statistics:

- team batting average (total hits divided by total at-bats)
- total home runs
- total runs batted in
- total stolen bases
- total wins
- total saves
- team earned run average (ERA) (9 times total earned runs allowed by pitchers divided by total innings pitched) (Note: Lower values for this statistic are better.)
- team walks plus hits per inning pitched (WHIP) (total number of hits and walks allowed by pitchers divided by total innings pitched) (Note: WHIP was invented by Daniel Okrent for use in his original league.)

These statistics have become the standard for modern rotisserie leagues. A league using these statistics is known as a "4×4" league because it uses four hitting stats and four pitching stats. Some leagues use a "5×5" format, with runs scored and strikeouts added as hitting and pitching stats, respectively. Others are "6×6", which can involve adding new statistics or replacing ones in the original 4x4 or 5x5 format. For example, ESPN fantasy writer Tristan H. Cockcroft has proposed a 6x6 league in which batting average is replaced with on-base percentage (OBP) and slugging percentage (SLG), while innings pitched is added as the sixth pitching stat, among other changes. The rotisserie format can theoretically be expanded to encompass any number of statistics, though online support for such expansive leagues is limited (for example, CBS Sports only offers 4x4 and 5x5 leagues).

==== Head-to-head variations ====
There are three major configurations for head-to-head play:

- Head-to-Head Rotisserie: Also called head-to-head each category, this format assigns wins, losses, and ties based on each team's performance in individual categories. For example, in a 5x5 league, if Team A performs better in six categories, Team A receives six wins and four losses for that week's matchup, while Team B receives four wins and six losses.
- Head-to-Head One Win: Also called head-to-head most categories, this format assigns wins, losses, and ties based on which team performs better in the most categories. For example, in a 5x5 league, if Team A performs better in six categories, Team A receives the sole win for that week's matchup, while Team B receives the loss. If each team performs better in the same number of categories, then each receives a tie.
- Head-to-Head Points: In this format, each category is assigned a certain number of points, and the team that performs better in each category receives the points. The team with the most points receives the sole win for the matchup.

In all three configurations, opponents are dictated by a round-robin system. At the end of the season, the team with the best win–loss record may win the league, (Note: In a head-to-head points league, the team with the most points may also be declared the victor. This variation is known as a season points league.) or playoffs may be held among the top teams in the league.

Major fantasy websites, such as ESPN and Yahoo, hold single-elimination playoffs over three or four weeks towards the end of the MLB regular season. The number of teams that make the playoffs and the existence of a consolation bracket for teams that miss out may vary based on the website used and the customized settings employed by a particular league. For example, Yahoo allows leagues to have four, six, or eight teams make the playoffs.

=== Roster variations ===
- Keeper leagues allow teams to keep a set number of players on their roster from one year to the next and sometimes even assign them contracts for a certain number of years. In the first season of a keeper league, the draft is performed in the same way as any other standard league draft, however, in all subsequent years, the draft only involves players not selected to be kept on their team. Keeper leagues may allow each team to retain as few as one player or as many as every player on the roster except one.
- In dynasty leagues, each team keeps all players on its roster from one year to the next. Rosters are replenished with drafts of rookies and players who were not on a team the previous year.
- Salary cap leagues assign each eligible MLB player a salary before each season. The combined salary of each roster may not exceed a predetermined salary cap.

After teams have set their rosters via the draft, owners may add free agents, players who are not currently on any team, to their roster if the roster is not already full. There are a few possibilities by which teams may acquire these players:

- Under the waiver wire format, which is also commonly used in fantasy football, teams may place claims on free agents until a predetermined deadline, at which time the team with the lowest position in the standings with a claim on a player gains that player. Teams with lower positions in the standings are therefore said to have higher waiver priority. After acquiring a player, a team is moved to the bottom of the priority list.
- Under the Free Agent Acquisition Budget (FAAB) format, each team has a predetermined budget that may be used to bid on available free agents. If a team uses its entire budget, it will be unable to acquire new free agents until the league budgets are reset, which may occur on a weekly or even daily basis.
- The First Come, First Served (FCFS) format allows any team to add any free agent at any time with no restrictions.

== Draft ==
Before each season, fantasy baseball leagues hold a draft in which each team drafts MLB players. These players are kept on the roster of the team that drafted them unless they are traded for other players or are dropped, whereby they enter a pool of unowned players that any team may claim. The order of draft picks may be determined randomly or by the league standings from the previous year, in which the team with the worst record picks first, followed by the team with the second-worst record, etc. In some cases, owners retain the same draft position in each round. In contrast, in a traditional "serpentine" or "snake" draft, owners draft players in a "snake" method, in which the owner who picks first in the odd rounds picks last in the even rounds, the owner who picks second in the odd rounds picks second to last in the even rounds, etc. in the interest of fairness.

In an auction draft, each owner has an imaginary budget which must be used to purchase players in an auction format. Owners take turns nominating players for open bid, and the owner who bids the highest on each player receives that player, reducing their remaining budget accordingly. One proposed advantage of auction drafts is their ability to offer every owner equal access to every player, whereas in a traditional format, a certain owner's desired player may be selected by another team before the owner's next turn to pick.

Drafts can be conducted in "live" or "auto" formats. Live drafts involve team owners selecting players in real time, while auto drafts are those in which selections are made automatically by computer based on pre-draft rankings set by each owner. Often, owners who are not present at the chosen time of the draft will "auto-draft" while the rest of the league makes their selections live.

Regardless of format, the vast majority of fantasy drafts take place online, but some leagues hold in-person drafts in which selections are made on computers or physical draft boards.

Regardless of the format in which a draft is held, each team owner may employ a variety of strategies when making their selections. In order to select the best possible players, owners must evaluate the talent and forecast the performance of each player for the upcoming season. A variety of resources may be used to this effect, from rankings released by fantasy baseball journalists and websites to algorithms created by professional daily fantasy competitors.

== Team rosters ==
A fantasy baseball roster is conventionally composed of players from each position. Each team is allowed a set number of players on its roster, as well as a specified number of starters at each position that can be used in a head-to-head matchup. Owners may determine which players will start and which will be "benched" on a weekly or even daily basis. Only players who are designated as starters will have their statistics count towards the team owner's totals in the weekly matchup.

Just like in real baseball, players who are usually benched can become starters for various reasons: due to a starting player's injury, poor performance, or if the starter's team is not playing on a particular day. Whether to sit or start a player is also based on strategic considerations, such as the player's past and expected performance and the team he is playing, specifically its starting pitcher. (Note: Batters perform statistically better against pitchers with the opposite dominant hand. Pitches thrown by a pitcher with the opposite dominant hand of the batter will break towards the batter, rather than away from him, making them easier to see, track, and hit. As a result, a fantasy owner may prioritize the batters on their roster who are facing pitchers with opposing dominant hands. The owner may also prioritize pitchers on the roster who will be facing many batters with the same dominant hands.) If a league does not have head-to-head matchups, then there may be no distinction between starters and bench players, as a team's end-of-season results are derived from the cumulative statistics of the entire roster.

The precise positions included in online rosters vary widely, along with the number of players allowed at each position and on each team's bench. For example, ESPN's default roster includes one middle infielder, one corner infielder, and one utility player. A default Yahoo roster includes two utility players, neither of which is designated as a middle or a corner infielder. DraftKings, which operates a variety of daily and weekly games, does not have utility slots on its rosters for some games, but does for others.

The following table lists the default roster settings for head-to-head leagues managed by ESPN, Yahoo, and CBS Sports, as well as in DraftKings' MLB Classic weekly competitions. A note next to a position's name indicates its definition.

Position	ESPN	Yahoo	CBS Sports	DraftKings
Pitchers (Note: Can be starting or relief pitchers.)	9	4	0	2
Starting Pitchers	0	2	5	0
Relief Pitchers	0	2	2	0
Catchers	1	1	1	1
First Basemen	1	1	1	1
Second Basemen	1	1	1	1
Third Basemen	1	1	1	1
Shortstops	1	1	1	1
Middle Infielders (Note: Can be a second baseman or shortstop.)	1	0	0	0
Corner Infielders (Note: Can be a first or third baseman.)	1	0	0	0
Outfielders	5	3	3	3
Utility Players (Note: Can play any position.)	1	2	1	0
Bench Players (Note: Players who are not starting and whose statistics will not count towards weekly totals. Can play any position.)	4	5	5	0
Injured Reserve (Note: Players with long-term injuries. Can play any position.)	3	4	2	0

The injured reserve is used to store players with real-life injuries who are unable to compete for an extended period of time. Fantasy leagues usually only allow players to be placed on injured reserve if they have been placed on the injured list by their MLB team.

Some leagues limit teams to a certain number of free agent transactions or trades per season or per week. Such limitations are commonly used to prevent team owners from artificially inflating their statistics or otherwise achieving an unfair advantage by using an excessive number of players during a matchup. Another common limitation on roster moves is the adoption of a list of "undroppable" players, generally those selected in the first few rounds of the draft or those who are generally deemed too valuable to be allowed to freely change teams without being exchanged for other players.

== Demographics ==
According to the Fantasy Sports & Gaming Association (FSGA), an estimated 62.5 million people played fantasy sports in the US and Canada in 2022. The FSGA estimated that 19% of American adults played fantasy sports in 2023, compared to 13% in 2014. Around 22% of fantasy players play fantasy baseball, making it the third most popular fantasy sport behind fantasy football and fantasy basketball. A 2023 FSGA survey found that 64% of fantasy sports players were male, 48% were between the ages of 18 and 34, and 84% had a college degree or higher. A 2015 analysis found that 89.8% were white and 51.5% were unmarried.
