= Fantasy Sports & Gaming Association =

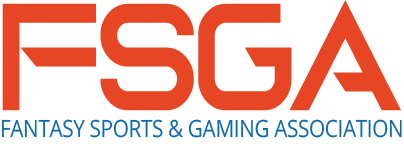
- Abbreviation: FSGA
- Legal status: Trade Association
- Headquarters: Middleton, Wisconsin
- Region served: International
- Members: Over 200 companies
- Chairperson: Stacie Stern
- Staff: 1
- Volunteers: 17
- Website: https://thefsga.org/

The Fantasy Sports & Gaming Association (FSGA), formerly the Fantasy Sports Trade Association, is a Middleton, Wisconsin-based trade group representing the fantasy sports and gaming industries. In 2019, the FSTA changed its name to the Fantasy Sports & Gaming Association with to coincide with changes in US law allowing states to enable sports betting.

Founded in 1998, the FSGA provides demographic data, annual conferences, and collective action, including lobbying, to support the growth of fantasy sports and sports betting leagues. Its members range from small startups to large media corporations. The FSGA currently holds two annual conferences, one in the summer and one in the winter.

== History ==
In 1997, CDM Fantasy Sports, a St. Louis, Missouri-based fantasy sports company, invited competitors Sportsline, Prime Sports Interactive, Sports Buff Fantasy Sports, and The Sporting News to St. Louis to discuss pending legislation that could severely limit the growth of the fantasy sports industry. Over the next year, the companies communicated without an official organization and tracked the legislation. In 1998, during a fantasy sports conference in Las Vegas hosted by Fantasy Insights, a meeting was organized to again discuss pending legislation and several other topics related to the industry. The representatives from CDM, Fantasy Insights, EA Sports, The Sporting News, and USFANS decided that it was time to create an official organization to help promote fantasy sports, and the Fantasy Sports Trade Association was born.

Carl Foster was president from 1999 to 2002. Greg Ambrosius was president from 2003 to 2006. Jeff Thomas was the president from 2006 to 2008. Paul Charchian was president from 2009 to 2020. Stacie Stern became the new leader, with the position title changed to chairperson, in 2020 and currently heads the organization.

== Demographic data ==
The FSGA has tracked the growth of fantasy sports from 500,000 players in 1988. FSGA demographic data shows that of the 59.3 million people who played fantasy sports in the US and Canada in 2017, 43.2 million were American adults. In 2019, 45.9 million American adults participated. The FSGA estimated that 19% of American adults played fantasy sports in 2019, compared to 13% in 2014. A 2019 FSGA survey found that 81% of fantasy sports players were male, 50% were between the ages of 18 and 34 (with an average age of 37.7), 67% were employed full-time, and 47% made more than $75,000 per year. A 2015 analysis found that 89.8% were white and 51.5% were unmarried.

According to the FSGA, the most popular fantasy sport in the US and Canada is gridiron football, which is played by approximately 78% of fantasy participants. The next most popular sports are baseball (39%), basketball (19%), ice hockey (18%), and association football (14%).

== Legal issues ==
The FSGA has been at the forefront of the tension that has existed between fantasy sports companies and professional leagues and players associations over the rights to player profiles and statistics. The issue came to a head with the lawsuit of Major League Baseball Advanced Media (MLBAM), MLB's Internet wing, vs. St. Louis-based CBC Distribution and Marketing Inc., the parent company of CDM Sports. When CBC was denied a new licensing agreement with MLBAM (they had acquired the rights from the baseball players' association) for its fantasy baseball game, CBC filed suit.

The FSGA filed a friend of the court brief in support of CBC arguing that intellectual property laws and so-called "right of publicity" laws do not apply to the statistics used in fantasy sports. The FSGA also argued that if MLBAM won the lawsuit it would have a dramatic impact on the industry, which was largely ignored by the major sports leagues for years while a number of smaller entrepreneurs grew it into a multi-billion-dollar industry, and a ruling could allow the MLBAM to have a monopoly over the industry.

"This will be a defining moment in the fantasy sports industry," said Charlie Wiegert, executive vice president of CBC. "The other leagues are all watching this case. If MLB prevailed, it just would have been a matter of time before they followed up. Their player unions are just waiting for the opportunity."

CBC won the lawsuit as U.S. District Court Judge Mary Ann Medler ruled that statistics are part of the public domain and can be used at no cost by all fantasy companies. "The names and playing records of major-league baseball players as used in CBC's fantasy games are not copyrightable," Medler wrote. "Therefore, federal copyright law does not pre-empt the players' claimed right of publicity."

The 8th Circuit Court of Appeals upheld the decision in October 2007. "It would be strange law that a person would not have a First Amendment right to use information that is available to everyone," a three-judge panel said in its ruling.

== Board of directors ==
The Fantasy Sports Trade Association is managed by an elected Board of Directors that hosts elections each year in February.

== Hall of Fame ==
Beginning in 2000, the FSGA has honored past members and contributors to fantasy sports with induction into its Hall of Fame.

As of 2014, 17 people have been inducted into the FSGA Hall of Fame. They are:

- 2000: Daniel Okrent, inventor of rotisserie baseball
- 2000: Glenn Waggoner, editor of the Rotisserie Baseball Handbook
- 2000: Cliff Charpentier, Fantasy Sports Inc.
- 2001: Greg Ambrosius, STATS, Inc.
- 2001: John Dewan, STATS, Inc.
- 2001: Charlie Wiegert, CDM Fantasy Sports
- 2001: Bill James, author and sabermetrician
- 2002: John Benson, Diamond Analytics Corporation
- 2004: Peter Pezaris, Daedalus World Wide Corporation
- 2006: Ron Shandler, Baseball HQ
- 2011: Peter Schoenke, Rotowire.com
- 2011: Bill Winklebach, founder of the GOPPPL fantasy football league
- 2011: Rick Wolf, Full Moon Sports Solutions
- 2012: Matthew Berry, fantasy sportswriter for ESPN
- 2013: Paul Charchian, LeagueSafe
- 2013: Glenn Colton, Dentons, U.S.
- 2014: Rob Pythian, SportsData, LLC
