= FanDuel Sports =

FanDuel Sports may refer to:

- FanDuel Group, an American gambling company.
- FanDuel TV, an American sports betting-oriented digital cable and satellite television network owned by FanDuel Group.
- FanDuel Sports Network, a group of regional sports networks in the United States owned by Diamond Sports Group which FanDuel Group owns the naming rights for.
