= Kappa Delta Rho =

American collegiate social fraternity

- ΚΔΡ
- Founded: May 17, 1905; 121 years ago Middlebury College
- Type: Social
- Affiliation: NIC
- Status: Active
- Scope: National
- Motto: Honor Super Omnia "Honor Above All Things"
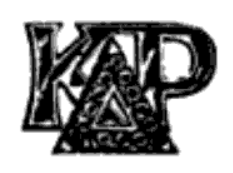
- Member badge
- Colors: Middlebury blue Princeton orange
- Flower: Red rose
- Mascot: Peregrine falcon
- Publication: Quill & Scroll
- Chapters: 35
- Members: 1,761 active 26,476 living lifetime
- Nickname: KDR, KAP, The Rho
- Headquarters: 2900 Seminary Drive; Greensburg, Pennsylvania 15601; United States
- Website: www.kdr.com

Kappa Delta Rho (ΚΔΡ), commonly known as KDR, is an American collegiate social fraternity that was established at Middlebury College in 1905. It has chartered 84 chapters, 35 of which are active, in the United States, primarily in the Midwest and Mid-Atlantic regions.

== History ==
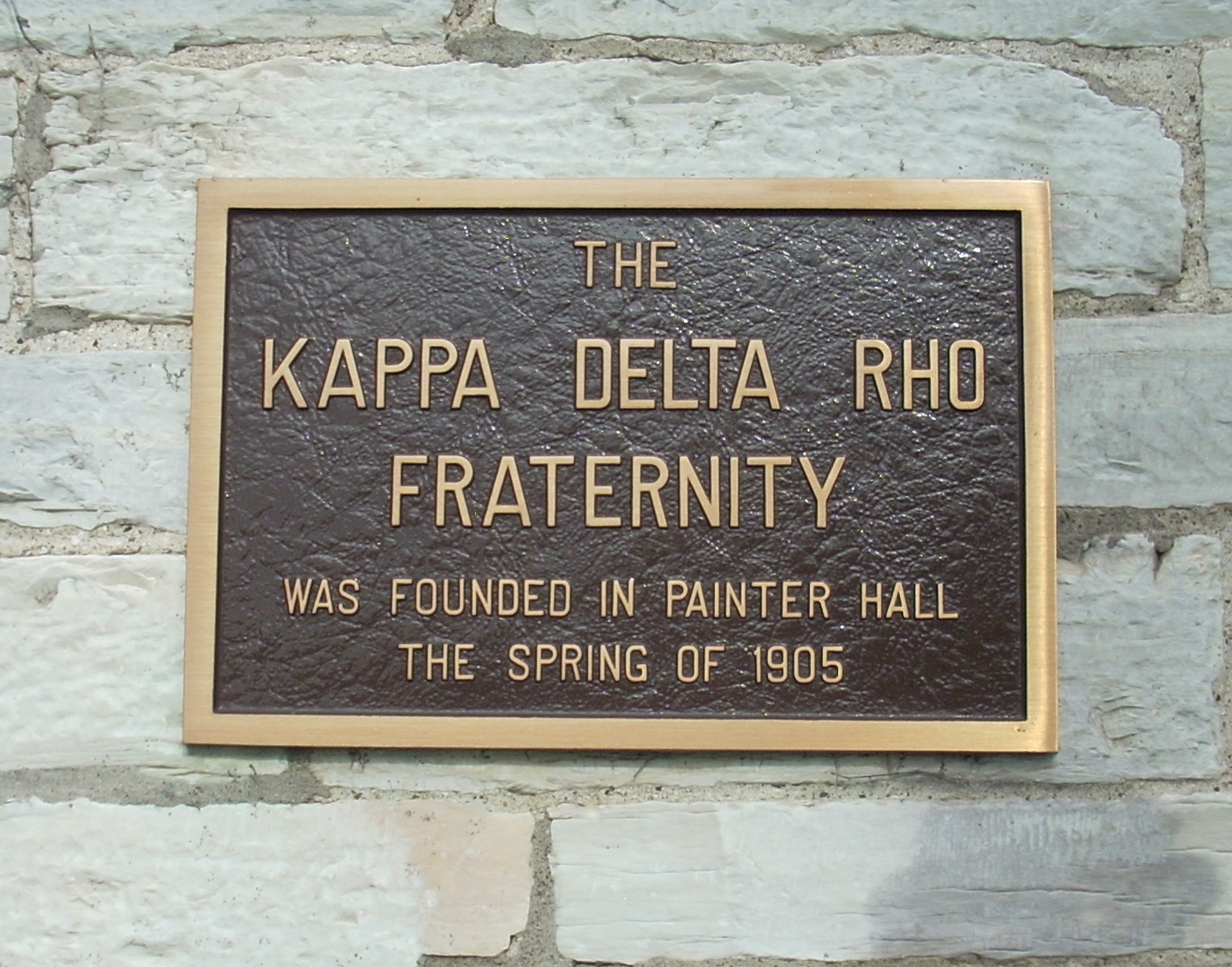
A plaque on Painter Hall at Middlebury College commemorating the founding of Kappa Delta Rho within the building.

=== Founding and development ===
Kappa Delta Rho was founded in room 14 of Old Painter Hall at Middlebury College in Middlebury, Vermont on May 17, 1905. Middlebury was the site of chapters of three fraternities that year: Chi Psi, Delta Kappa Epsilon, and Delta Upsilon. However, not finding these organizations to their liking, the founders of Kappa Delta Rho chose to create their new organization. Kappa Delta Rho was the created by ten men from the Middlebury Commons Club. The ten principal founders are George Edwin Kimball, Irving Thurston Coates, John Beecher, Pierce Wordsworth Darrow, Thomas Howard Bartley, Benjamin Edward Farr, Gideon Russell Norton, Gino Arturo Ratti, Chester Monroe Walch and Roy Dyer Wood.

In the fraternity's first year, founders Kimball, Walch, and Ratti met by committee to draft the ritual, open motto, and constitution. Walch created the fraternity's secret motto and password. For its organizational structure, the founders chose Roman nomenclature for fraternity positions, evocative of Roman values. Ratti, who had previous artistic experience, designed the coat of arms and helped develop the ritual. He also chose the fraternity's colors and flower.

This activity was soon noticed by a representative from Delta Tau Delta fraternity, who met with the founding members to discuss the absorption of KDR into DTD. While the founders indeed had expressed some interest in joining a national fraternity, the debate soon turned against this idea. In Kimball's words: "We had decided that we preferred to paddle our own canoe and took no further action in the matter." Yet the idea of national expansion took root, and by 1913, KDR had established its second chapter, Beta, at Cornell, and soon after, its third chapter, Gamma, at SUNY Albany.

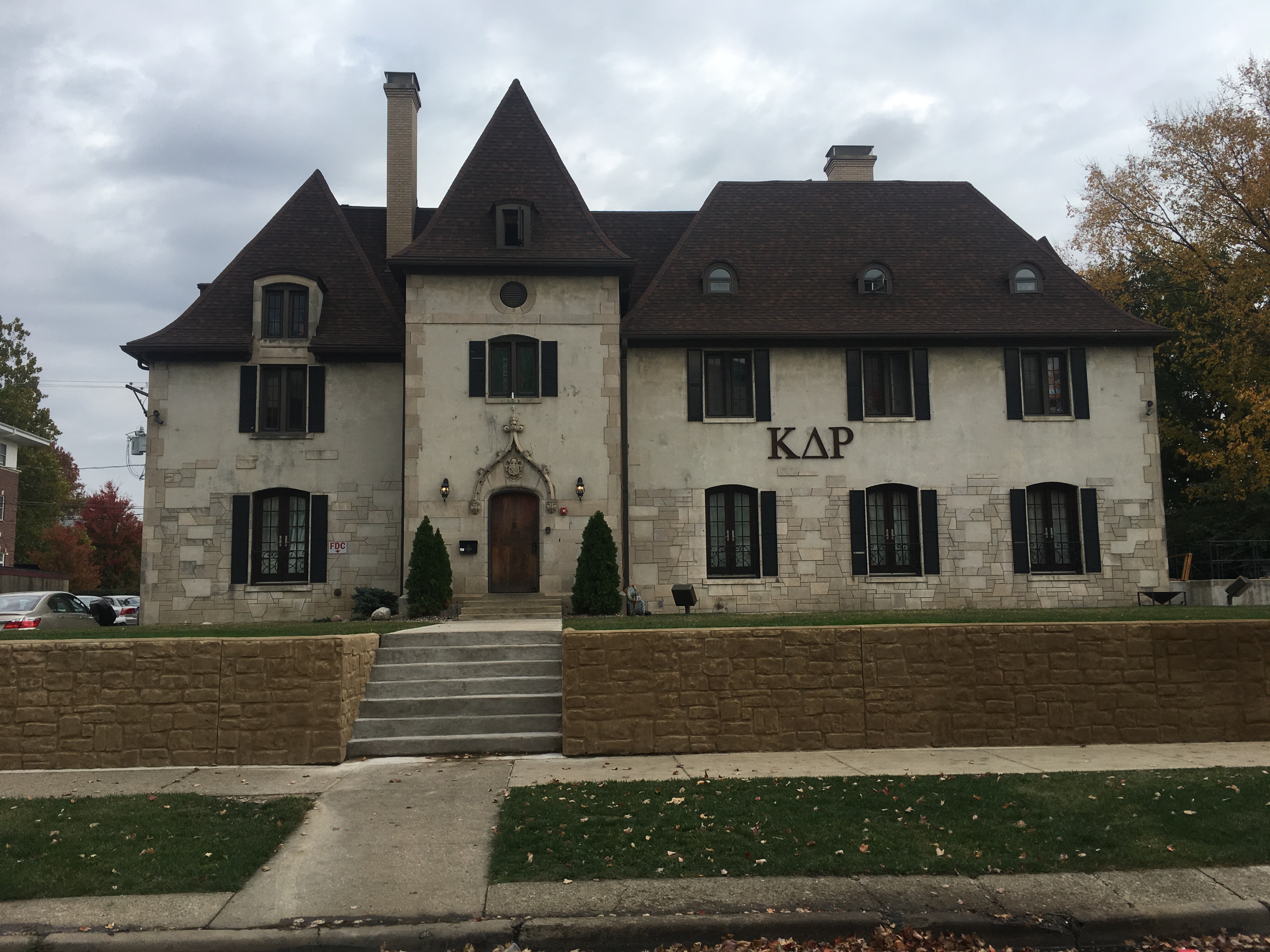
University of Illinois chapter house, listed on the National Register of Historic Places

=== Growth ===
Kappa Delta Rho became a Junior Member of the North American Interfraternity Conference (NIC) in 1921, and a Senior Member in 1929.

Growth continued after World War II, when chapters that had briefly ceased operations reopened to returning students, and expansion again became possible. Similarly, after World War II, the fraternity successfully reopened to the flood of returning GIs fifteen of its then twenty chapters in the fall of 1946.

In 1960, the KDR Trust was formed, which marked the birth of today's KDR Foundation, an educational, charitable, and literary foundation.

KDR has allowed moderate expansion during most of its history, with several new chapters forming in each ensuing decade. The pace of chapter growth increased substantially in the 1980s and 1990s. For example, while the 1970s saw just two chapters formed, during the 1980s the fraternity gained 28 new chapters. All told, the fraternity has organized at more than 80 campuses, and from these boasts 35 active chapters and colonies. See the list of KDR chapters.

=== Co-educational pressure ===
Unusual among college fraternities, KDR's Alpha chapter at Middlebury chose to coeducate or accept both male and female members in 1989, due to a policy at the school against single-sex organizations. Their choice was stark: either that or disband, an unthinkable choice for the founding chapter of a national fraternity. After several years of negotiation, the Alpha chapter was restored to its place as the eldest chapter of the fraternity and by agreement was the only chapter of the Kappa Delta Rho Society, a parallel branch of the fraternity meant to support this, its only co-ed chapter.

Because of its special status, Alpha chapter maintained its traditions and a unique badge, slightly modified from the standard fraternity badge, which ironically, Alpha men had designed at the 1905 birth of the fraternity. Alpha chapter was also the only nationally affiliated fraternity chapter at Middlebury, where all other groups remain "locals". On June 25, 2015, Middlebury College terminated its relationship with KDR.

Kappa Delta Rho is one of two fraternities (the other being Alpha Delta Phi) to have a co-ed chapter within the North American Interfraternity Conference.

== Symbols and traditions ==
Kappa Delta Rho's open motto is "Honor Super Omnia" or "Honor Above All Things". The fraternity's publications describe its values as fellowship, leadership, scholarship, service, and tradition. Its credo was first nationally published in The Fraternity Month in October 1946. The author was George E. Shaw, Alpha (1910), director of Kappa Delta Rho and national historian.

Its colors are Middlebury blue and Princeton orange. Its flower is the red rose and its symbol is the Peregrine falcon. The fraternity's badge is gold and set in pearls, in the form of the Greek letters Κ and Ρ, with Δ on top.

The Kappa Delta Rho coat of arms is a shield over crossed daggers. On the shield, is a scale, an open book, and a lighted lamp. Under the shield, in scroll with the fraternity's motto in Latin.

== Publications ==
The National Office of the fraternity publishes a semi-annual news magazine called the Quill & Scroll. First published as The Scroll in 1909 at Middlebury College, the Fraternity changed its name in 1924 after it became a national publication. Today, articles in The Quill and Scroll detail the successes of the National Fraternity, the various alumni corporations, undergraduate chapters, and individual members. The articles reflect the high ideals of KDR as experienced by its undergraduates and alumni.

The Pathfinder is the KDR educational and historical manual. It is given to those who choose to pledge to the fraternity so that they may understand the responsibilities of membership. It also provides them with an introduction to how KDR is organized, how it operates, and what the roles are of the chapter, alumni, and National Office. The Manual is updated every few years by the National Office to bring it up to date with new information, policies, and ideas.

== Awards ==
Awards are given out to chapters and individual Brothers each year at the National Convention. Chapter awards include the Robert D. Corrie Award for Chapter of The Year, O.D. Roberts Award for Chapter Improvement, Donald C. Wolfe for Outstanding Newsletter, George E. Kimball Award for Outstanding Social Service, John L. Blakely Award for Outstanding Philanthropics, Leo T. Wolford Award for Outstanding Campus Involvement, Gino A. Ratti Award for Outstanding Alumni Relations, E. Mayer Maloney Award for Outstanding Faculty Relations, Dr. Harold Osborn Award for Outstanding Intramural Sports, and the George E. Shaw Award for Outstanding Public Relations.

Individual awards are also handed out, including Outstanding Senior, Outstanding New Member, Outstanding Advisor, and the Red Rose Award. In addition, qualified Alumni may be inducted into the prestigious Ordo Honoris based upon achievements in either their career, community, or their dedication to the fraternity.

== Foundation ==
Kappa Delta Rho is financially supported through undergraduate dues and by the Kappa Delta Rho Foundation, a 501(c)(3) charity. The Foundation raises funds from Brothers, family, and friends of KDR to financially support the educational, leadership, and character development programs undertaken by the National Fraternity. The Foundation also manages both individual and collective scholarship endowments of the National Fraternity, providing more than $100,000 in academic support each year to qualified members of the Fraternity.

=== Scholarships ===
The Kappa Delta Rho Foundation provides competitive scholarships based on academic achievement, as well as financial need. Applications are submitted online. The Foundation also serves as a caretaker to several Chapter-specific scholarships and area-of-study-specific scholarships that can be applied for with the same application. The Foundation typically gives away more than $100,000 in annual scholarships with individual awards ranging from a minimum of $500 upwards to $5,000.

In addition to competitive academic scholarships the Foundation also gives away non-competitive New Member academic scholarships. Any KDR brother who received above a 3.0 GPA on a 4.0 scale during his pledging semester will receive $100 from the Foundation, providing they submit the proper documentation.

The Kappa Delta Rho Foundation also offers scholarships for the Undergraduate Interfraternity Institute and Futures Quest, both of which are educational programs run by the North American Interfraternity Conference. The scholarships cover the full cost of registration for each program.

=== Programs ===
The Elmon M. Williams Leadership Academy is a multi-day leadership program that occurs each August (in conjunction with the National Convention in even-numbered years) and is funded in large part by the Foundation. The Academy allows undergraduate KDR brothers to learn more about being an effective leader in their Chapter and the professional world.

The Consuls Academy is a three-day leadership program held every January for incoming Chapter Consuls (presidents). This intensive academy prepares Consuls for the responsibilities of running a Chapter.

In 2007 the KDR Foundation created the Kappa Delta Rho Wilderness Institute, which occurred once a year in a different wilderness location around the country. Brothers who were admitted to the program through an application process took part in a multi-day hike that was led by an alumni mentor and experienced guide. The program was designed to provide hands-on leadership programming, substance-free brotherhood-building activities, personal growth opportunities, and core values exploration. The Wilderness Institute continued until 2011.

In 2014, KDR introduced a total-member education program called The Legion. This four-year personal development track grounded in the Fraternity's values combines the latest educational technology with a holistic personal development curriculum to mold Brothers from the first day of new member education to prepare them for life after graduation.

== Chapters ==
Kappa Delta Rho has 84 chapters, 35 of which are active.

== Local chapter or individual member misconduct ==
In 2003, the KDR chapter at Colgate University had its recognition withdrawn for repeated violations of the university's hazing policy.

In 2015, the KDR chapter at Pennsylvania State University was suspended for three years after their private Facebook page that showed naked women who appeared to be sleeping, passed out, or otherwise incapacitated, apparently without the subjects' consent. At least 144 current KDR members and alumni were members of the social media group. An earlier version of the site had been taken down after a woman saw a naked photo of herself and threatened to report it. 38 members of the fraternity were expelled. A student claimed that as a pledge, he was burned with cigarettes, physically beaten, and forced to drink liquor mixed with urine and hot sauce.

In 2024, Bucknell University revoked KDR's recognition after an alleged hazing incident.

== Notable members ==
=== Business ===
- Nicholas M. Bonaddio, Tau 2004 - CEO, numberFire and Chief Product Officer, FanDuel
- Douglas Cifu, Nu Alpha 1987 - CEO, Virtu Financial; vice chairman and alternate governor, Florida Panthers
- Robert J. Sinclair, Rho 1953 - President, Saab-Scania of America, Inc.
- Colston E. Warne, Beta 1920 - founder of Consumers Union; publisher of Consumer Reports magazine
- Archibald C. West, Epsilon 1936 - Vice President, Frito-Lay; creator of Doritos

=== Athletics ===
- C. Edward Ackerly, Beta 1920 - 1920 Olympic Games gold medalist, wrestling
- Steve Axman, Beta Alpha 1969 - Indoor Football League and college football coach
- John Cannady, Nu 1947 - Pro Bowl NFL linebacker
- Owen Dougherty, Zeta 1951 - college football and baseball coach at IUP
- Chuck Ealey, Pi Alpha Honorary - CFL football player and Grey Cup champion, holds NCAA record for consecutive wins by a quarterback
- Milt Graham, Delta 1956 - CFL and AFL football player
- Jim Harbaugh, Mu 1986 - former NFL quarterback, head football coach of the Los Angeles Chargers, former head football coach of the San Francisco 49ers, Stanford University, University of Michigan and University of San Diego
- Joe Hoague, Delta 1941 - NFL football player; National High School Association Hall of Fame Coach
- Jim LeClair, Beta Alpha 1966 - NFL quarterback
- Greg Manusky, Delta 1988, former NFL linebacker and coach
- Harold Osborn, Eta 1922 - 1924 Olympic Games gold medalist, decathlon, high jump
- Steve Rivera, Lambda 1976 - All-American college and NFL wide receiver
- Peter D. Rocca, Lambda 1979 - Olympic silver medalist, Pan American Games gold medalist, swimming
- Fran Rogel, Zeta 1950 - Pro Bowl NFL fullback
- Donald F. Yenko, Zeta 1951 - race car driver; muscle car driver; creator of Yenko Camaro

=== Military and public service ===
- Gene Dodaro, Psi 1973 - Comptroller General of the United States
- Charles I. Carpenter, Iota 1927 - Major General, Air Force Chaplain
- Joseph B. McDevitt, Eta 1940 - Rear Admiral, Judge Advocate General of the Navy
- John S. Fisher, Iota Honorary - Governor of Pennsylvania
- Ari Fleischer, Alpha 1982 - White House Press Secretary
- Christopher Mellon, Xi (c.) 1979 - United States Deputy Assistant Secretary of Defense for Intelligence
- Matt Urban, Beta 1941 - Lieutenant Colonel, U.S. Army; Medal of Honor recipient

== See also ==
- List of social fraternities and sororities
- Kappa Delta Rho Fraternity House (Champaign, Illinois)
