= Stronach Group =

North American entertainment and real estate company

The Stronach Group
- Formerly: Magna Entertainment Corporation
- Type: Private
- Industry: Horse racetracks
- Founded: 1999; 27 years ago
- Headquarters: Aurora, Ontario, Canada
- Key people: Belinda Stronach
- Website: www.1st.com

Stronach Group, doing business as 1/ST (pronounced "first"), is an entertainment and real estate company in North America with thoroughbred horse racing and parimutuel gambling at the core.

== History ==
Magna Entertainment Corporation (MEC) was created in 1999 by parent company Magna International Inc. Magna International, a major automotive supplier based in Ontario, Canada, underwent a corporate reorganization in which its non-automotive businesses and interests were transferred to MEC. In March 2000, Magna International distributed shares in its new division to its current stockholders, establishing MEC as a separate public company. Magna Entertainment filed for Chapter 11 bankruptcy.

The Stronach Group entered the horse racing industry by purchasing Magna Entertainment Corporation's former holdings from MI Developments. In January 2020, the company announced a rebranding to the 1/ST banner for all consumer-facing operations.

== Stronach Group today ==
Stronach Group currently owns or manages racetracks in North America, including many thoroughbred tracks and two mixed (thoroughbred and standardbred) tracks. Stronach Group also operates the simulcasting venues at these tracks, as well as OTB (Off-track betting) facilities.

Other ventures include Xpressbet, a wagering business that allows customers to wager on over 100 horse racing tracks via internet or telephone.

Stronach Group also owns thoroughbred training facilities in conjunction with its racetracks in California, Florida, and Maryland, and owns and operates facilities that manufacture a straw-based bedding product, StreuFex.

In 2004, voters in Oklahoma approved legislation that allowed Stronach Group to add slot machines at Remington Park racetrack in Oklahoma City. Remington Park opened its casino, featuring 650 Class II gaming machines, in November 2005. Gulfstream Park in Hallandale Beach, Florida, followed suit in November 2006, with 516 slot machines and poker.

In 2006, under what was Magna Entertainment Corporation completed its purchase of AmTote International, who provide totalizator services to the horse racing industry. On March 23, 2010 an agreement was reached to sell the two Maryland Jockey Club tracks (Pimlico and Laurel Park) from Magna Entertainment Corporation to its parent company MI Developments. MI Developments received the tracks from M.E.C. in exchange for paying $25 million in cash for claims to Maryland Jockey Club creditors and $89 million to other creditors through a new reorganization plan. The U.S. Bankruptcy Court in Delaware, had until April 30 to approve Magna's reorganization plan.

== Owned racetracks and assets ==
Stronach Group owns the following tracks in order of acquisition date:

=== Race tracks ===
- Santa Anita Park, Arcadia, California. Acquired in December 1998 for $126 million.
- Gulfstream Park, Hallandale Beach, Florida. Acquired in September 1999 for $95 million.
- Laurel Park, Laurel, Maryland. Acquired 58% in November 2002 for $117.5 million (as part of MJC package) and an additional 20% for $18.3 million in September 2007. Management of Laurel changed in January 2025 to the Maryland Thoroughbred Racetrack Operating Authority, with Stronach Group retaining ownership of the property. Laurel hosted the 2026 Preakness Stakes and will close following renovations at Pimlico Race Course, where thoroughbred racing in Maryland will eventually be consolidated. The Stronach Group has an agreement to sell the Laurel property to the Maryland Stadium Authority for conversion to a year-round training center.
- Rosecroft Raceway, Fort Washington, Maryland. Acquired in August 2016.

=== Intellectual property ===
Stronach Group formerly owned the intellectual property for the Preakness Stakes, one of the three races in the U.S. Triple Crown. It also owned the rights to the Black-Eyed Susan Stakes, a race for fillies run on the same weekend as the Preakness.

In April 2026 it was announced that The Stronach Group would sell the rights for the Preakness and Black-Eyed Susan to Churchill Downs Incorporated. The transaction was expected to close after the 2026 Preakness. The sale agreement gave the state of Maryland the right to purchase said rights by matching CDI's offer, and the governor's office announced that the state had acquired the rights on July 30.

=== Other assets ===
- AmTote International, Hunt Valley, Maryland. A leading totalisator service provider with technological advancements in the pari-mutuel wagering industry. Magna acquired 30% for $3.82 million in August 2003 and acquired the balance of 70% in July 2006 for $14 million.
- Bowie Race Track, Bowie, Maryland, ceased racing operations in July 1985 prior to Magna's acquisition, the track now serves as a training center for Thoroughbred racehorses.
- Maryland Turf Caterers, Inc., Baltimore, Maryland. Acquired the caterers for $12.1 million in September 2005. MTC conducts on or off-premises catering services and also operate the Food & Beverage operations at Pimlico and Laurel.
- Palm Meadows Thoroughbred Training Center, Boynton Beach, Florida, built at a cost of $90 million on 304 acres (1.23 km2). The center opened in November 2002 as the largest training center in the United States.
- Xpressbet, Washington, Pennsylvania, was launched by Magna in March 2002 is a legal, licensed, U.S.-based account wagering provider that offers pari-mutuel wagering on thoroughbred, harness and quarter horse racing events either online or by telephone.
- STREUfex, Finley, New South Wales, Australia. A company that manufactures horse bedding made from pelletised straw.
- 800 acres (3.2 km^{2}) of land, in Porter, New York. Magna is attempting to sell the land where they had proposed to build a track. The asking price is believed to be $960,000.
- Dixon Downs, Dixon, California. Acquired in December 2000 Magna bought 260 acres (1.1 km^{2}) of land approximately 20 minutes west of Sacramento off I-80.
- The Village at Gulfstream Park, Hallandale Beach, Florida. Magna owns 50% interest (in conjunction with Forest City Enterprises) of the first phase of the development, scheduled for completion in February 2010, there will be more than 70 specialty shops, restaurants and outdoor cafes. Office space will also be available above a portion of the retail buildings.
- 1/ST TV is an online horse racing network that features live and video-on-demand coverage of thoroughbred races and workouts primarily from tracks operated by the Stronach Group. It was launched in 2015 as XBTV (Xpressbet TV) after the Stronach Group sold the HRTV network, and was rebranded to 1/ST TV in February 2025.

== Former properties ==
=== Race tracks ===
- Portland Meadows, Portland, Oregon. Acquired in October 2001 for $4.78 million (80% of $5.97 million package).
- Bay Meadows Racetrack, San Mateo, California (near San Francisco); Magna acquired (racing and operating rights) in August 2000 for $24.1 million, agreement expired in December 2004.
- Flamboro Downs, Hamilton, Ontario. Acquired in June 2002 for $46.2, sold to Great Canadian Gaming Corp. for a total of $63.9 million in August 2005.
- Multnomah Greyhound Park, Wood Village, Oregon. Magna acquired (racing and operating rights) in October 2001 for $1.2 million (20% of sale of Portland Meadows, sale totaling $5.97 million), agreement expired in September 2005.
- The Meadows Racetrack, North Strabane Township, Pennsylvania near Pittsburgh; Magna acquired in April 2001 for $53 million, sold to Millennium Gaming, Inc. for a total of $225 million in November 2006. Magna has agreement to manage racing operations for 5 years.
- San Luis Rey Downs Training Center, Bonsall, California a 205-acre (0.83 km^{2}) horse racing training facility that was sold by Magna in June 2007 for $24 million to M.I. Developments. The facility was leased back to a subsidiary of Magna and continues to operate.
- Great Lakes Downs, Muskegon, Michigan. Acquired in February 2000 for 267,000 Shares of Class A Voting Stock in Magna Entertainment. Magna had closed the track in November 2007, and sold the property to the Little River Band of Ottawa Indians in July 2008 for $5.9 million. The tribe is redeveloping the property.
- Thistledown Racecourse, North Randall, Ohio. Acquired in October 1999 for $14 million, sold to Harrah's Entertainment in September 2009 for $43 million (sale closed 07/28/10).
- Lone Star Park, Grand Prairie, Texas. Acquired in October 2002 (Owns racing and operating assets) for $100 million has agreed to sell to Global Gaming, RP (owned by the Chickasaw Nation) for $27 million in September 2009 (sale has been delayed by the Delaware bankruptcy judge due to a competing bid by Penn National Gaming.)
- Remington Park, Oklahoma City, Oklahoma. Acquired in for $10 million in February 2000, Magna has agreed to sell to Global Gaming, RP (owned by the Chickasaw Nation tribe) for $80.25 million in September 2009 (sale has not formally closed).
- Golden Gate Fields, Albany, California. Acquired in December 1999 for $77 million. The Stronach Group closed Golden Gate in June 2024.
- Pimlico Race Course, Baltimore, Maryland. Acquired 51% in November 2002 for $117.5 million (as part of MJC package) and an additional 20% for $18.3 million in September 2007. Pimlico was transferred to the Maryland Thoroughbred Racetrack Operating Authority (MTROA) in July 2024 after the Stronach Group reached an agreement with the state of Maryland.

=== Other assets ===
- Colonial Downs, New Kent, Virginia. Acquired majority management interest and simulcast rights in November 2002. Sold off for $10 million in September 2005.
- TrackNet Media, a media company owned by Churchill and Magna, acted as a horse racing content provider and negotiated Advance Deposit Wagering (ADW) contracts and simulcast agreements with racetracks. Dissolved in 2010.
- Horse Racing TV (HRTV) was a premium television network featuring racing from both Stronach Group tracks and other participating tracks. It was launched by the former Magna Entertainment in January 2003. In 2007, Magna sold 50% of Horse Racing TV to Churchill Downs Incorporated. In February 2015, HRTV was acquired by Betfair, owner of the competing TVG Network, and rebranded TVG2.
- Magna Racino, Ebreichsdorf, Austria. Built and opened in April 2004, Magna has agreed to sell to Sakoyah Beteiligungsverwaltungs GmbH, Vienna for just short of €40 million in September 2020.
- Ocala Meadows, Ocala, Florida. Magna has agreed in September 2009 to sell 490 acres (2.0 km^{2}) near Interstate 75 for $8.1 million (sale has not formally closed).
- In Romulus, Michigan, Magna purchased 218 acres (0.88 km^{2}) of vacant land in September 2002 for potential use as a thoroughbred race track, which would have been called Michigan Downs. Plans for the track were scrapped in 2007.
