= Kay Adams (sportscaster) =

American sportscaster, television personality (born 1986)

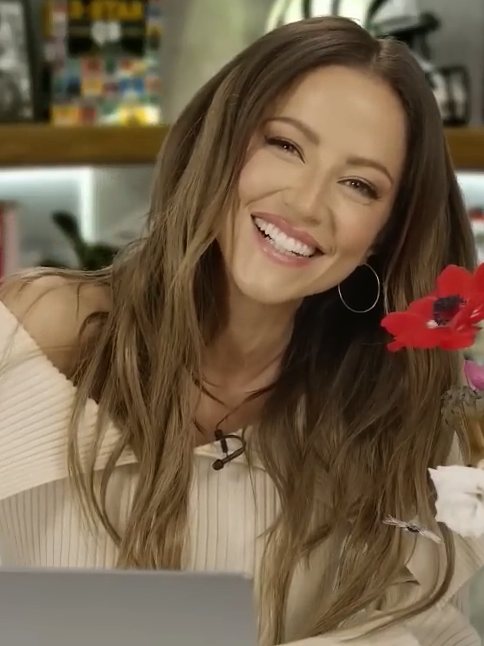
- Adams in 2023
- Born: April 6, 1986 (age 40); Chicago, Illinois, U.S.
- Education: University of Missouri
- Occupations: Sportscaster; television personality
- Years active: 2010–present

Kay Adams (born April 6, 1986) is an American sportscaster and television personality. She hosted Good Morning Football on NFL Network from 2016 to 2022. She previously had several on-air hosting roles and also hosted the DirecTV Fantasy Zone channel during football season. Following her departure in 2022 from NFL Network, Adams has hosted her own daily NFL show, Up & Adams, for FanDuel TV. From 2020 to 2022 she hosted the daily entertainment show People (the TV show!).

== Early life ==
Adams was born in Chicago on April 6, 1986. Her parents were immigrants from Poland. She became interested in a media career while attending Whitney M. Young Magnet High School.

After graduating from high school, Adams attended the University of Missouri, majoring in communications and working various part time jobs to pay for her education, including bartender at a sports bar and radio personality on local music and sports radio stations.

== Career ==
Early in her career, Adams was an in-game host for the St. Louis Cardinals at their home games.

Adams’ first role with professional football was on fantasy football shows, including SiriusXM's Livin' the Fantasy and SiriusXM Fantasy Drive and DirecTV's NFL Sunday Ticket Fantasy Zone. Adams was a guest on the October 17, 2012, episode of The Late Late Show with Craig Ferguson.

She has also worked for FanDuel and was a reporter for NBC Sports Network. While with NBCSN, she occasionally appeared as a guest on network shows such as The Crossover with Michelle Beadle, hosted by Michelle Beadle, and NBC SportsTalk.

From 2016 to 2022, Adams was one of the hosts of NFL Network's Good Morning Football. The show is the network's year-round morning show Monday through Fridays. She has also hosted special events for the Chicago Bears and a sideline reporter for Kansas City Chiefs exhibition games.

On November 3, 2016, Adams was co-host on Impractical Jokers in the Nitro Circus live event at the Prudential Center alongside Travis Pastrana on November 3, 2016.

On September 17, 2018, it was announced that Adams would be joining the DAZN boxing broadcast team hosting each fight night broadcast on the live and on-demand sports streaming platform, alongside Sugar Ray Leonard, Brian Kenny, Chris Mannix and LZ Granderson.

In 2020, Adams hosted a mobile version of Who Wants to be a Millionaire where the general public played for real money. Adams also hosted People (the TV show!), a daily entertainment newsmagazine based on People magazine which aired from the fall of 2020 until the spring of 2022 over the stations of Meredith Corporation (merged with Gray Television in the fall of 2021).

After deciding to not re-sign with NFL Network, Adams began hosting her own daily NFL sports show, Up & Adams, for FanDuel TV. The show, which launched on September 6, 2022, was credited with contributing to the growth of the channel's audience.
