= FanDuel Racing =

- Country: United States
- Broadcast area: National
- Headquarters: Los Angeles, California

Programming
- Picture format: 480i (SDTV); HDTV

Ownership
- Owner: FanDuel Group
- Sister channels: FanDuel TV

History
- Launched: November 1, 1983; 42 years ago
- Former names: Meadows Racing Network (1983–2002); HRTV (2003–2015)

Links
- Website: racing.fanduel.com

FanDuel Racing (formerly TVG2, HRTV, and Meadows Racing Network) is an American sports-oriented digital cable and satellite television network. It is part of the FanDuel Group and is owned by Flutter Entertainment. Dedicated to horse racing, it broadcasts events from U.S. and international racetracks, as well as a range of English and Western horse competitions, news, original programming and documentaries

== History ==
The Meadows racetrack launched the part-time Meadows Racing Network, distributed to Pennsylvania cable systems via satellite, on November 1, 1983, with the participation of Total Communications Systems. The launch of MRN coincided with the launch of Call-A-Bet, a service allowing users to wager for races on their phones. MRN preceded live races with a half-hour preview show hosted by track announcer Roger Huston.

The Meadows' owner Ladbroke Group PLC leased operations of the racetrack to Magna Entertainment Corp. in 2001. Magna replaced Call-A-Bet with Xpressbet, an internet and telephone-based wagering service encompassing both The Meadows and other racetracks managed by Magna. On January 1, 2003, Magna relaunched MRN as the nationally distributed Horse Racing Television (HRTV) network, providing coverage of races at the 13 company-owned racetracks and programming from 60 other tracks. Magna used the network to promote their Xpressbet wagering system.

Magna Entertainment sold 50% of the network to Churchill Downs Incorporated in 2007; Stronach Group acquired Magna's stake in HRTV in 2011. In February 2015, HRTV was acquired by Betfair, owner of the competing TVG Network. HRTV was consolidated into TVG Network's Los Angeles facilities, and re-branded as TVG2 on October 28, 2015. The move to TVG's facilities also allowed the network to begin broadcasting in high definition.

In September 2022, the network was relaunched as FanDuel Racing, consistent with its sister-network's rebrand as FanDuel TV.

== Programming ==
Since rebranding as FanDuel Racing, the channel broadcasts continuous live horse races in blocks branded as Live Racing! The blocks feature regular and special stakes races from Santa Anita Park, Churchill Downs, Gulfstream Park, Arlington Park, Pimlico Race Course, NYRA, and numerous other top U.S. and international racetracks.
