= Pro Football Focus =

Gridiron football player rankings system

Pro Football Focus

Pro Football Focus (also written as ProFootballFocus, and often referred to by its initials, PFF) is a sports analytics company that focuses on thorough analysis of the National Football League (NFL) and NCAA Division-I football in the United States. PFF produces 0–100 Player Grades and a range of advanced statistics for teams and players by watching, charting, and grading every player on every play in every game both at the NFL and FBS level.

The company publishes their data as a collection of various mostly web-based products. Some basic information is made freely available, while other more advanced products are on a fee or subscription basis.

== History ==
PFF was founded by Neil Hornsby in the United Kingdom. Dissatisfied with some limitations of standard statistics, Hornsby began grading players in 2004. The staff gradually expanded over the next few years, and the site was launched in 2007. The 2006 NFL season was the first season for which PFF has compiled a complete set of data.

For the 2011 season, PFF provided customized data to three NFL teams, agents, media and NFL players.

In 2014, sports commentator and former NFL player Cris Collinsworth bought a majority interest in the service, which moved its operations to Cincinnati, near where Collinsworth lives in Fort Thomas, Kentucky.

PFF began collecting data for every NCAA Division-I college football game in 2014.

As of 2021, PFF provides customized data to all 32 NFL teams, 102 NCAA FBS teams, 9 CFL teams, national/regional media (e.g., The Washington Post, The Athletic, ESPN) and sports agencies/agents.

In March 2026, PFF’s B2B entity was acquired by Teamworks with the consumer arm of the business remaining with Cris Collinsworth.

== Grades ==
PFF grades every NFL player on every play on a scale of -2 to +2 using half-point increments. The grades are contextual and not necessarily based on statistics. For example, a four-yard run may be graded differently based on factors like down and distance or broken tackles; while a four-yard run for a touchdown may be a +2, a four-yard run that is stopped short of the line to gain on 3rd down may be graded as a negative play. Similarly, an interception may be graded differently if it is tipped by a wide receiver or thrown directly to a defender.

The evaluations are then extrapolated onto a 0–100 ratings scale that is sorted by position and free for anyone to view. These grades appear in many areas of NFL media, including NBC Sunday Night Football player introductions.

Furthermore, grades are separated by play type. Beyond just an overall grade, an offensive lineman receives one grade for pass-blocking and one for run-blocking. The average grade for every position and play type is meant to be a 60, with raw grades being normalized.

In watching every game, PFF is also able to record information and create data that is typically unavailable. One example is how frequently individual offensive linemen yield pressure.

== Advanced statistics ==
PFF claims to cover every player on every play of every game at the NFL and major college football levels and creates advanced statistics based on the information gleaned from this.

== Criticism ==
PFF has been criticized by the analytics community regarding the accuracy and veracity of its ratings. In contrast to the purely quantitative ratings released by sources such as Football Outsiders, TeamRankings, and numberFire, PFF uses qualitative and opinion-based grading as the root of its 0–100 Player Grades – not its advanced statistics. As such, the 0–100 Player Grades are not truly quantitative and could be seen as being prone to bias, poor sample sizing, or other issues.

== Notable employees ==
- Bobby Slowik - Former Senior Analyst
- Zac Robinson - Former Senior Analyst
- Bruce Gradkowski - Former Senior Analyst
- Gunther Cunningham - Former Director of Football Oversight
