= Nigel Eccles =

Northern Irish businessman

- Born: 8 December 1974 (age 51); County Tyrone, Northern Ireland
- Education: University of St. Andrews
- Employer: Flick
- Title: CEO
- Spouse: Lesley Eccles (m. 2004)
- Children: 3

Nigel Eccles (born 8 December 1974) is a technology entrepreneur and the CEO of the online crypto casino BetHog. He is best known for being the co-founder and CEO of Hubdub and FanDuel.

== Early life ==
Eccles was born on 8 December 1974 in County Tyrone, Northern Ireland. He was educated at the Cookstown High School and majored in pure mathematics at University of St Andrews.

== Career ==
Eccles launched the online political prediction market Hubdub in 2007. Later he stated that Hubdub lacked a sustainable business model, prompting the company’s focus to shift, eventually evolving into FanDuel.

Eccles co-founded the daily fantasy company FanDuel in 2009. Beginning in 2016, he oversaw plans for a merger between FanDuel and Draftkings, which was blocked by the Federal Trade Commission in 2017.

In November 2017 Eccles left FanDuel to pursue a new venture in the esports industry.

In January 2018, Eccles co-founded an Edinburgh-based video game and social streaming platform Flick.

In May 2020, Eccles co-founded StarStock, a platform for buying and selling sports cards. In March of 2021, StarStock raised $8 million in a round of funding, with investors including Andreesen Horowitz and Atlanta Hawks guard Trae Young.

== Personal life ==
Eccles married Lesley in 2004; she was also a co-founder of FanDuel. They have three children.
