= Hollywood Casino at The Meadows =

Racing track in North Strabane Township, Pennsylvania

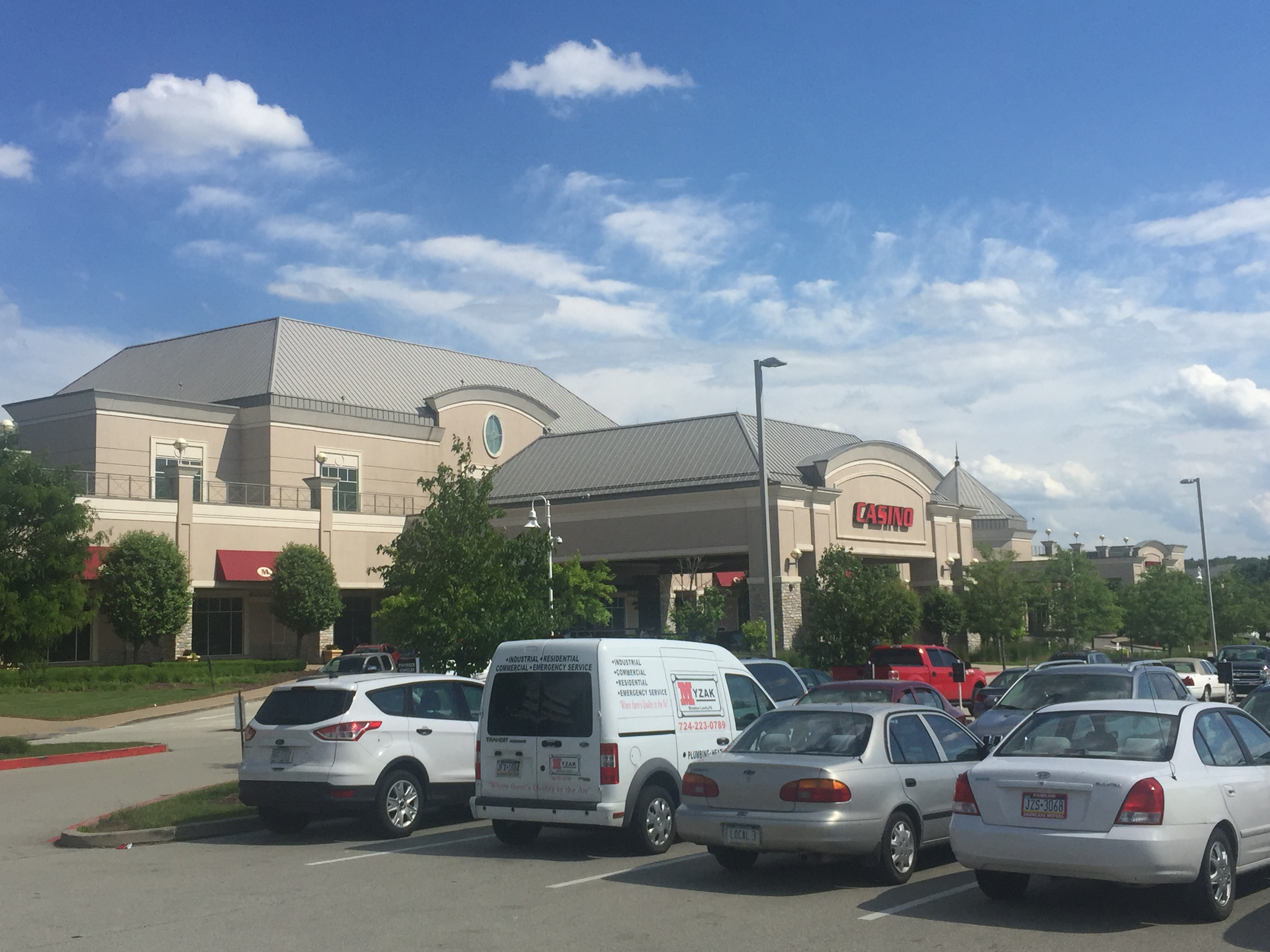
- Interactive map of Hollywood Casino at The Meadows
- Location: North Strabane Township, Pennsylvania, U.S.A.
- Owned by: Gaming and Leisure Properties
- Operated by: Penn Entertainment
- Date opened: June 28, 1963; 63 years ago (Horse racing); 2007 (Casino) (Note: Casino gambling started in a temporary onsite facility in June 2007, moving to a permanent facility in April 2009)
- Race type: Harness
- Course type: Dirt
- Notable races: The Adios

The Hollywood Casino at The Meadows, formerly The Meadows Racetrack and Casino, originally (1963) just The Meadows horse-racing track, is a Standardbred harness-racing track and slot-machine casino which is located in North Strabane Township, Pennsylvania, United States, about 25 miles (40 km) southwest of Pittsburgh. After 44 years as a racetrack, the casino was added in 2007. The real estate has been owned by Gaming and Leisure Properties since 2016, with the business operations owned by Penn Entertainment since 2018, including a long-term lease agreement to Gaming and Leisure Properties.

== History ==
Delvin Miller
- Location within Pennsylvania
- 40.21622°N 80.20184°W
- Location: 210 Racetrack Road; Washington, Pennsylvania

In November 1962, ground was broken for the first parimutuel horse-racing track in Western Pennsylvania, to be operated by the Washington Trotting Association. The track opened on June 28, 1963, and was officially named The Meadows.

The Washington Trotting Association was purchased in February 1973, by a group that included trainer/driver Delvin Miller. Miller's imprint still exists on the track today, with The Meadows most prestigious race bearing his name (the Delvin Miller Adios Pace for the Orchids), and a statue of his famous sire Adios located at the track's entrance. In 2009, the Pennsylvania Historical and Museum Commission erected a historical marker at The Meadows to note Miller's historic importance.

The Meadows introduced two significant technological advancements in 1983: Call-A-Bet and the Meadows Racing Network (MRN). Call-A-Bet allowed users to create individual wagering accounts and phone-in wagers for races. In conjunction, the MRN telecast each day's live races and was distributed to local cable providers. The telecast also included a half-hour preview show hosted by track announcer Roger Huston. The track used a marketing campaign to promote the services with the slogan "Every 16 minutes, the place goes crazy", alluding to the typically quick pace from race-to-race at harness tracks.

Pittsburgh lawyer Stuart A. Williams purchased the track in 1986, and subsequently sold it to England-based Ladbroke Group PLC in 1988. The company changed the name to Ladbroke at the Meadows and opened a series of off-track betting parlors named Ladbrokes. The first opened in New Castle, Pennsylvania, in June 1990. Locations followed in Greensburg, Johnstown, Harmar Township, Moon, and West Mifflin (all in Pennsylvania). The Greensburg location was closed in 2000 following the decline and eventual vacancy of the Greengate shopping mall where it was located. The Johnstown location was later sold to the Penn National Gaming corporation in July 1998. All other locations remained operational.

Magna Entertainment Corp. leased the track from Ladbroke in 2001. Magna transformed Call-A-Bet into Xpressbet, an internet- and telephone-based wagering service that allowed users to not only wager on The Meadows, but also on numerous other tracks owned by Magna or with whom a business agreement was in place. Xpressbet later expanded its operation to over 300 tracks. The Meadows was also featured on HRTV, a cable television station part-owned by Magna. The OTB names were changed to "The Meadows-location" (e.g. The Meadows-Harmar). Another Greensburg OTB location was opened in 2004, but closed in 2007. The Meadows-West Mifflin also closed it doors in April 2012.

Las Vegas-based Cannery Casino Resorts purchased the track in July 2006. Magna was retained to operate the track under a five-year management contract.

In December 2007, Crown Limited, an Australian company, agreed to purchase Cannery's casino assets and The Meadows, but in March 2009 Crown backed out of the deal.

In May 2014, Cannery agreed to sell The Meadows to Gaming and Leisure Properties Inc. (GLPI) for $465 million. GLPI said that it would retain ownership of the real estate, while a third-party company would operate the facility. The price was reduced to $440 million after GLPI filed a lawsuit accusing Cannery of misleading them about the property's financial performance. The sale was completed in September 2016, with Pinnacle Entertainment buying the operating business from GLPI for $138 million and leasing the property for $25 million per year.

Horse racing was suspended at the racetrack in late January 2018 and 190 horses and five barns placed under quarantine after the virus EHV-1 was detected. Racing resumed again less than a month later.

Penn National Gaming (now Penn Entertainment) acquired the operations of The Meadows in October 2018 as part of the acquisition of Pinnacle.

== Casino ==
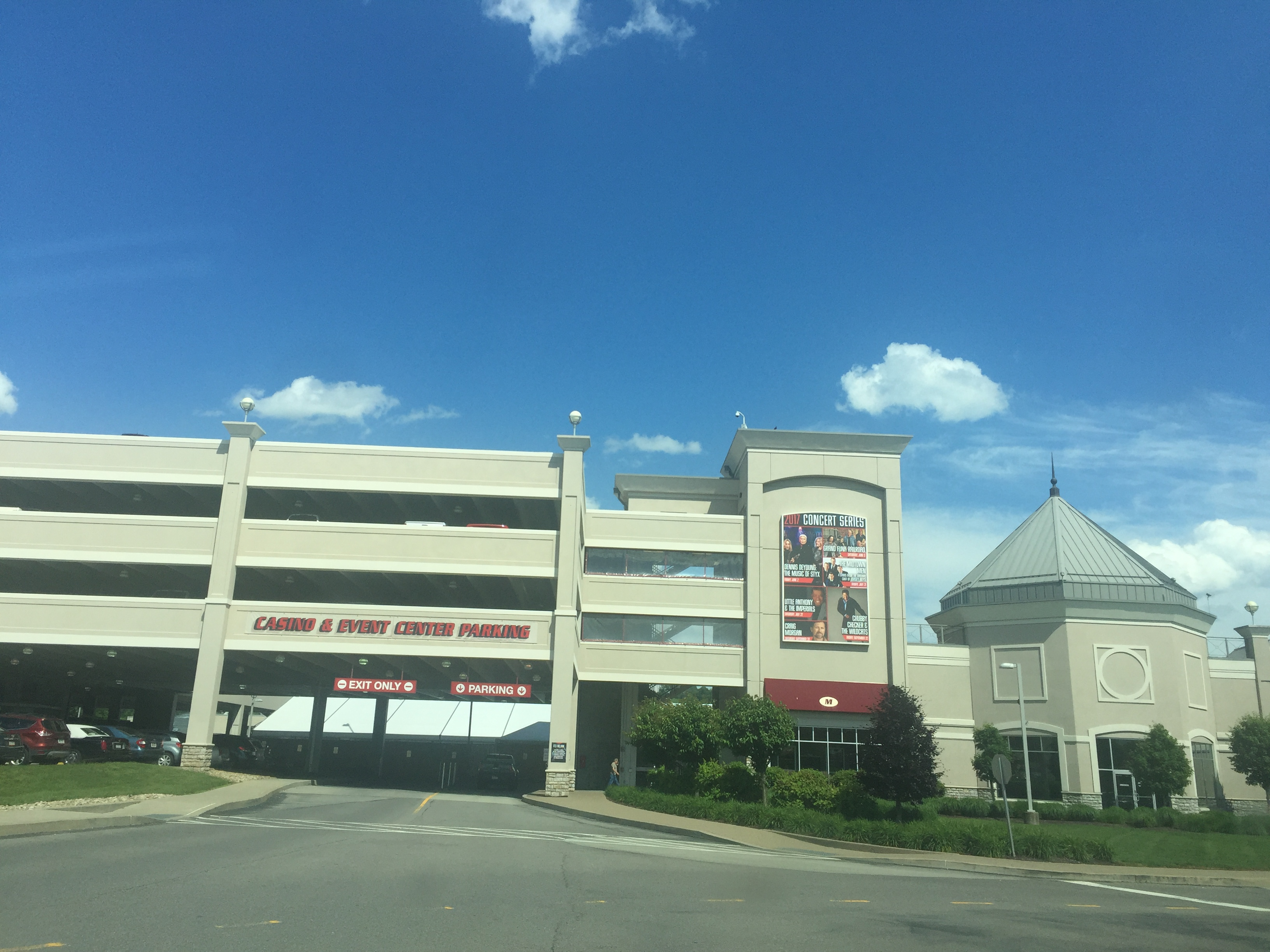
The Meadows garage

Legislation passed in Pennsylvania in July 2004 included The Meadows among the locations slated to obtain a gambling license for slot machines. The legislation upheld a 2005 legal challenge by gambling opponents, and on September 27, 2006, The Meadows was awarded a gaming license by the Pennsylvania Gaming Control Board.

On November 16, 2006, The Meadows broke ground on construction. Plans called for initial construction of a temporary casino adjacent to the track, which opened on June 11, 2007.

On September 5, 2007, a ceremony was held to mark the beginning of the grandstand removal, which was necessary to clear space for the permanent casino. The permanent casino opened on April 15, 2009; the temporary building was also closed on this date. Amenities include a 350,000-square-foot (33,000 m^{2}) casino, food court, café restaurant, premier steakhouse with view of the race track, covered grandstand, simulcast viewing area, VIP boxes, and a 24-lane, state-of-the-art bowling center. The Meadows features over 3,300 slot machines.

On July 6, 2010, The Meadows Casino hosted an "invitation-only test date" for casino table games. The test runs were successful, and at 6 AM on July 8, 2010, the table games (including roulette, blackjack, craps, etc.) opened to the general public. The chips used by the Meadows Casino are RFID chips containing a microchip that identifies them as legitimate. This measure prevents counterfeit chips from entering into the play area.

On October 2, 2019, the Pennsylvania Gaming Control Board approved a sports-betting license for The Meadows Racetrack and Casino, which will also offer online sports betting in partnership with DraftKings. A soft opening for the sportsbook occurred on October 8, 2019, with the grand opening on October 10, 2019, featuring former Pittsburgh professional athletes in attendance for the ribbon-cutting ceremony. The DraftKings online sportsbook launched on November 4, 2019.

== The Meadows ==
The Meadows, the harness racing facility in operation since 1963, forms a component part of the racino.

=== Physical attributes ===
The race track is a 5/8-mile (1006-m) oval. As the standard harness race distance is 1 mi (1609 m), races start on the backstretch and proceed through three turns.

The original track surface was made of Tartan track, a synthetic material manufactured by 3M. As problems with Tartan surfaces began to emerge, the surface was changed to a more traditional stone dust.

The track has no hub rail (inner portion is marked by pylons). The stretch is 566 ft (173 m) in length, and 80 ft (24 m) in width, with an inside passing lane in the stretch, referred to as the Lightning Lane.

=== Racing ===
Unlike many other tracks in the United States, The Meadows conducts racing throughout the year, with more than two hundred days of the year featuring live racing. The specific days that the track conducts live racing vary. Racing is conducted primarily on Monday, Tuesday, Wednesday, and Saturday afternoons with first race post time at 1:00 pm Eastern.

Races are conducted with a maximum of nine starters on the gate; horses in post ten start from the second tier.

=== Current stakes races ===
- Delvin Miller Adios Pace for the Orchids: In August, as part of Grand Circuit week and The Meadows signature event, the Adios is a prestigious race for three-year-old open pacers. It has been raced every year since 1967. The 2008 running was held at Mohegan Sun at Pocono Downs due to ongoing construction at The Meadows.
- Adioo Volo: Also in August, part of Grand Circuit week, it is the female equivalent of the Adios, conducted for three-year-old filly pacers. It has been raced every year since 1972. The 2008 running was held at Mohegan Sun at Pocono Downs due to ongoing construction at the Meadows.
- Arden Downs: Also part of Grand Circuit week, these two-year-old filly pace, filly trot, and colt/gelding trot races have been run every year since 1957; three-year old filly trot and colt/gelding trot races have been run every year since 1958.
- Currier and Ives: In May and June, these three-year-old open and filly trot races have been run every year since 1975.
- Pennsylvania Sire Stakes: On various dates May through September, all combinations of two- and three-year-old, colt/gelding and filly, trotter and pacer races are held.
- Pennsylvania Fair Finals: In October, all combinations of two- and three-year-old, colt/gelding and filly, trotter and pacer races are held.
- Keystone Classic: In October, all combinations of two- and three-year-old, colt/gelding and filly, trotter and pacer races are held.

=== Past stakes races ===
- The Messenger Stakes (1995–2003): Traditionally run at Roosevelt Raceway, The Messenger is the final leg of the three-year-old Pacing Triple Crown. In the nine years the event was run at The Meadows, three horses captured the Triple Crown: Western Dreamer (1997), Blissfull Hall (1999), and No Pan Intended (2003).
- The John Simpson Sr. Memorial Stakes (1963–1967): "The Super Bowl" two-year-old colt trot, "The Bret Hanover" two-year-old colt pace, "The Ayres" three-year-old colt trot, and "The Albatross" three-year-old colt pace
- Pacing Classic Final (1997): This open pacing event has been run every year since 1997, at various distances, all longer than the standard mile (1610 m), and at a different track each year. The Meadows hosted the inaugural version of the race at 1 1/4 miles (2012 m).
- Classic Distaff Final (1998): A filly and mare pacing event, it has been run every year since 1997. The race is conducted at various distances, all longer than a mile, and at a different track each year. The Meadows version of the race was held at 1-1/4 mi (2012 m).
- Classic Oaks Final (1999): This filly and mare trotting event has been run every year since 1997, at various distances, all longer than a mile, and at a different track each year. The Meadows version of the race was held at 1-1/4 mi (2012 m).
- The Lady Maud (2001–2003). Traditionally run at Yonkers Raceway, this three-year-old filly pacing event has been run every year since 1960.

== See also ==
- List of casinos in Pennsylvania
- List of casinos in the United States
- List of casino hotels
