= Palm Meadows Thoroughbred Training Center =

Horse training facility in Boynton Beach, Florida

Coordinates: 26°32′43″N 80°10′58″W

Palm Meadows Thoroughbred Training Center is an American stable and training facility for Thoroughbred racehorses located near Boynton Beach, Florida, just north of the Gulfstream Park racetrack. It is owned by Stronach Group. It was built by MI Developments (MID) at a cost of $90 million. The 304-acre (1.23 km^{2}) center opened in November 2002 and is regarded as one of horse racing's largest and most modern training centers in the United States.
