= RotoGrinders =

RotoGrinders.com
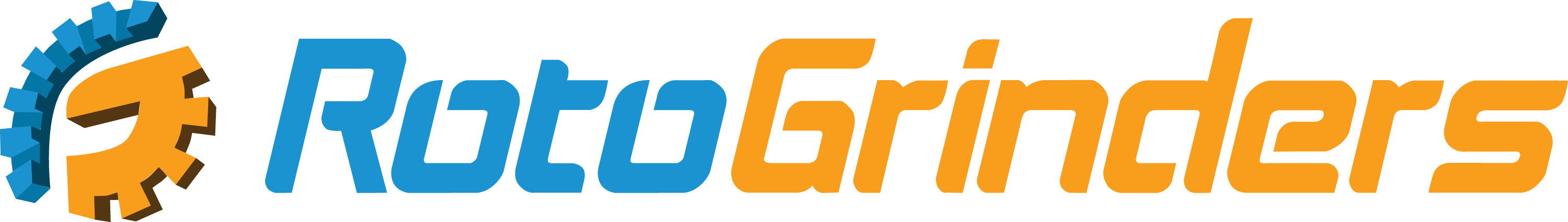
- Website type: Daily fantasy sports
- Founded: September 3, 2010
- Headquarters: Nashville, Tennessee, United States
- Area served: Worldwide
- Founders: Cal Spears; Cameron MacMillan; Riley Bryant
- Key people: Cal Spears, CEO Cameron MacMillan, COO Dan Back, SVP Riley Bryant, CTO
- Industry: Internet, fantasy sport
- Website: www.rotogrinders.com

RotoGrinders is a web-based daily fantasy sports community and daily content website co-founded by Cal Spears, Riley Bryant and Cameron MacMillan in 2010.

Since 2012, RotoGrinders has hosted the “Tournament Player of the Year” race, which is designed to recognize the best large-field, daily fantasy tournament player each year. The Tournament Player of the Year rankings are calculated by aggregating results from contests across all major daily fantasy gaming sites. Participants are awarded points using a formula based on their top-50 finishes in tournaments with prize pools greater than $10,000.

In addition to ranking the top players, the site offers news, tips, forums, daily shows, tips and tools for creating daily fantasy lineups. In October 2014, NBC Sports announced the creation of a partnership with RotoGrinders for daily fantasy content. RotoGrinders was named the 2015 Best News & Analysis Site in the Daily Fantasy Sports category by the Fantasy Sports Trade Association.

In October 2018, RotoGrinders created the RG Network. The purpose of the network is to establish player rankings systems similar to the Tournament Player of the Year in other online gaming industries, including poker and sports betting. The RG Network consists of RotoGrinders and three other platforms owned by the company: PocketFives, Fantasy Insiders and SharpSide.

In May 2019, Copenhagen-based Better Collective purchased a controlling interest in RotoGrinders. In the terms of the agreement, Better Collective acquired a 60% stake in RotoGrinders for a fee of $21 million and will acquire the remaining 40% between 2022 and 2024. In light of 2018 legislative changes legalizing sports gambling on a state-by-state basis, the transaction created a strategic crossover between daily fantasy sports and sports betting for both companies.

On November 4, 2021, Better Collective decided to complete the acquisition of the remaining 40% share stake in the US based RotoGrinders Network at a total price of 33 mEUR. The acquisition of the remaining 40% of the shares were paid through a 22 mEUR cash consideration and the remaining part in shares or cash. This brought the expected transaction price for 100% of the shares in RotoGrinders Network to a total of 51 mEUR, an equivalent to 7.5x the expected 2021 EBITDA.

On January 1, 2022, Dan Back took on a new role as the Senior Vice President of Operations at RotoGrinders. In a corresponding move, Cal Spears and Cameron MacMillan stepped back, and into advisory roles.
