= Kappa Delta Rho Fraternity House (Champaign, Illinois) =

- U.S. National Register of Historic Places
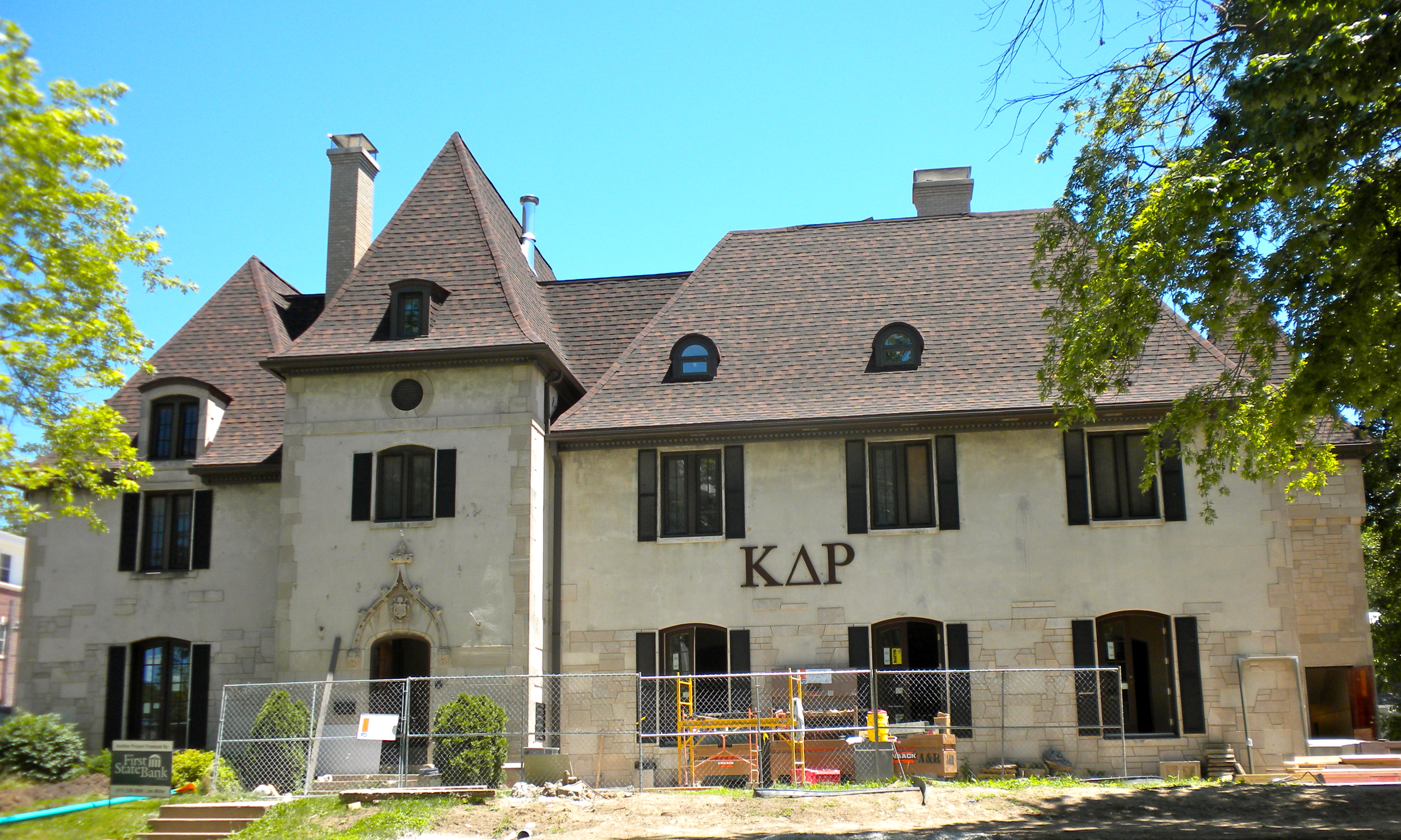

- Location within Illinois Location within the United States
- Location: 1110 S. Second St., Champaign, Illinois
- Coordinates: 40°6′17″N 88°14′15″W
- Area: less than one acre
- Built: 1928
- Architectural style: French Eclectic
- MPS: Fraternity and Sorority Houses at the Urbana--Champaign Campus of the University of Illinois MPS
- NRHP reference No.: 90000750
- Added to NRHP: May 21, 1990

The Kappa Delta Rho Fraternity House was a historic fraternity house located at the University of Illinois at Urbana–Champaign in Champaign, Illinois. The house was built in 1928 for the university's Eta chapter of the Kappa Delta Rho fraternity, which chartered in 1921.

The building had a French Eclectic design, a style popularized in America after World War I by returning soldiers and several photographic studies of French homes. Its key French Eclectic features include a stucco exterior, a limestone entrance surround shaped like a basket handle, a stair tower, casement windows, and a hip roof with flared eaves.

The house was added to the National Register of Historic Places on May 21, 1990.

== See also ==
- North American fraternity and sorority housing
