= Nik Bonaddio =

American Internet entrepreneur

- Born: Nicholas Bonaddio
- Education: Carnegie Mellon University
- Occupation: internet entrepreneur
- Known for: Founder of numberFire, Chief Product Officer at FanDuel
- Website: nikbonaddio.com

Nik Bonaddio is an American Internet entrepreneur, and founder and CEO of the sports analytics site numberFire. In 2017, he was named Chief Product Officer at FanDuel, who acquired numberFire in September 2015.

== Career ==
After graduation, Bonaddio began work at Yahoo! as a software engineer. Bonaddio founded numberFire in 2009, after a successful appearance on ABC's Who Wants to Be a Millionaire with Regis Philbin. During the show's 10th anniversary run, Bonaddio won $100,000, which was then used to found numberFire.

Since its founding, numberFire has grown to over 600,000 subscribers and has gained recognition in the marketplace for accurate predictions, including correctly predicting winners of the Super Bowl and the NCAA Men's Division I Basketball Championship.

numberFire was purchased by FanDuel in September 2015. Terms were not disclosed.

After spending three years as the Chief Product Officer at FanDuel, Bonaddio left in 2020 to start BigBrain, an online gaming company. BigBrain's core gaming IP was purchased by US-based fantasy sports and sports betting app Fliff in 2025; terms were not disclosed, and Bonaddio joined Fliff as Chief Product Officer as a part of the transaction.

== Education ==
Bonaddio was raised in Wexford, Pennsylvania, a suburb in the North Hills neighborhood of metropolitan Pittsburgh, and graduated from nearby North Allegheny Senior High School. During his time at North Allegheny, he was featured multiple times in local newspapers for awards received for his online design collective, Lockjaw and was a varsity athlete on the soccer and tennis teams.

He received a B.S. in 2004 from Carnegie Mellon University in Information Systems, followed by a M.S. in Information Systems Management in 2005. During his time at Carnegie Mellon, he was a two-time All-American athlete and record holder in track and field and a member of the Kappa Delta Rho fraternity.

== Awards ==
A prominent member of the emerging NYC tech scene, Bonaddio has been featured in a variety of publications and conferences. In addition to routinely contributing to ESPN, he has been featured in Sports Illustrated in 2011, FastCompany in 2012, and Under30CEO and Entrepreneur magazine amongst others in 2013.

== Other ventures ==
Bonaddio has also participated in high-stakes daily fantasy sports competitions. In 2022, he placed third in FanDuel's World Fantasy Baseball Championship and first in its World Fantasy Football Championship. In March 2023, he won the World Fantasy Basketball Championship, achieving multiple top finishes in FanDuel live final events.
