= PrizePicks =

Sports betting company in the US

SidePrize LLC
- Traded as: PrizePicks
- Industry: Daily fantasy sports; Sports betting
- Founded: 2015; 11 years ago
- Founders: Adam Wexler; Jay Deuskar
- Headquarters: Atlanta, Georgia, U.S.
- Key people: Mike Ybarra (CEO); Adam Wexler (Executive Chairman); Jay Deuskar (CTO); Renee White (CPO)
- Products: Daily Fantasy Sports
- Owner: Allwyn
- Website: www.prizepicks.com

SidePrize LLC, also known as Performance Predictions LLC, is an American daily fantasy sports (DFS) operator doing business as PrizePicks. The company is known for offering DFS contests, such as "pick 'em"-styled games for its users.

Headquartered in Atlanta, it has encountered contentious legal issues due to its distinction as a DFS operator, as opposed to a sportsbook. On January 16, 2026, it was announced that lottery operator Allwyn had completed the purchase of a 62.3% stake in the firm for approximately $1.5 billion.

== Description and operation ==
PrizePicks is particularly known for its daily fantasy sports, holding a status as the largest daily fantasy sports operation in North America and the United States. The Chicago Tribune has written that PrizePicks is a DFS operator specifically, "rather than a sportsbook" or "a traditional sports betting site".

Due to this distinction, it has been able to operate in states where online sports betting is not legal. Some of the DFS contests that PrizePicks offers include "pick'em-style games", which have been described as "closely [mirroring] player prop betting" found in traditional sports betting.

As of June 2024, the company offers paid fantasy games in 30 U.S. states and Washington, D.C.

== History ==
Adam Wexler developed the concept for PrizePicks in late 2014, and co-founded the company with Jay Deuskar as PredictPicks. (Note: Sources differ on when PrizePicks was officially founded. Chicago Tribune lists it as 2015, while the Inc. 5000 profile on PrizePicks lists it as 2017.) Wexler and Deuskar also serve as the company's chief executive officer (CEO) and chief technology officer (CTO), respectively. The service's name was changed to PrizePicks in October 2018. Despite sports betting being illegal in Georgia, PrizePicks' DFS distinction allows it to operate in the state. As such, it is headquartered in Atlanta, having originally worked out of the Atlanta Tech Village, before moving its headquarters to the Star Metals building in West Midtown in April 2024. PrizePicks invested $25 million into its West Midtown headquarters. Wexler has ties to the area, being an Atlanta native and a graduate of the University of Georgia. Deuskar is also from Atlanta, having graduated from Georgia Tech.

The company is known for its support of esports since 2019, having connected with the video game publisher and fellow Atlanta-based company Hi-Rez Studios to support the publisher's Smite game. The DFS operator stated that its total esports entry fees increased over 110% from 2022 to 2023.

On February 1, 2024, the company announced a marketing partnership with the Stephen A. Smith Show, hosted by the titular sports media personality. The company announced a partnership with the Atlanta Braves in April, and in June, PrizePicks announced various partnerships and program launches. The company partnered with Kindbridge Behavioral Health in order to provide free assistance to users experiencing problem gambling issues. PrizePicks also entered a marketing partnership with State Farm Arena. The arena is notably located in Atlanta, the site of PrizePick's headquarters. Due to its history with esports, PrizePicks also launched "The Esports Lab", which details "stats, live matches and educational resources" regarding esports tournaments. The Esports Lab supports Counter-Strike 2, League of Legends and Dota 2.

On August 5, the company announced former Blizzard Entertainment president Mike Ybarra as Wexler's successor as CEO effectively immediately, with Wexler transitioning to an executive chairman role.

=== Legal issues and status ===
PrizePicks has been shut down in several states due to what these states deemed to be "sports betting"; as a result, in January 2024, PrizePicks launched betting products "more in line with traditional DFS constructs".

In September 2023, the Florida Gaming Control Commission (FGCC) sent a cease-and-desist letter to PrizePicks, with the state's gambling regulators accusing the DFS operator of "offering potentially illegal mobile betting games." The letter alleged PrizePicks offers "wagers on contest of skills", prohibited under Florida law. They were later ordered to end their pick 'em games in the state in February 2024. However, in April, PrizePicks re-entered the state's DFS market with a peer-to-peer contest format, which features "skill-based competitions where outcomes are determined by players' decisions, not by odds from the operators". PrizePicks dubbed their peer-to-peer contest as "Arena", with the format complying with Florida's law on gambling.

Also in February 2024, PrizePicks announced it would be at least temporarily ceasing paid contests in the state of New York due to changes in the state's gaming laws. Though PrizePicks stated it operated in good faith, believing that it had the capabilities to offer interactive fantasy sports (IFS) contests, the company agreed to pay "nearly $15 million to the state's gaming commission for operating without a license". The $15 million figure was based on revenue PrizePicks garnered from the purported IFS bets placed by New York-based bettors from June 4, 2019, through December 19, 2023. New York regulators had previously agreed to ban "pick'em" games in October 2023, though PrizePicks was in violation regardless because they did not have the authorization to offer any type of IFS games in the state.

In April 2026, a Maryland man was arrested for allegedly communicating graphic threats at PrizePicks executives via the company's customer service chat bot.
