= Daily fantasy sports =

Subset of fantasy sport games

Daily fantasy sports (DFS) are a subset of fantasy sport games. As with traditional fantasy sports games, players compete against others by building a team of professional athletes from a particular league or competition while remaining under a salary cap, and earn points based on the actual statistical performance of the players in real-world competitions. Daily fantasy sports are an accelerated variant of traditional fantasy sports that are conducted over short-term periods, such as a week or single day of competition, as opposed to those that are played across an entire season. Daily fantasy sports are typically structured in the form of paid competitions typically referred to as a "contest"; winners receive a share of a pre-determined pot funded by their entry fees. A portion of entry fee payments go to the provider as rake revenue.

In the United States, the daily fantasy sports industry was dominated by two competing services: the New York-based FanDuel, and the Boston-based DraftKings. Both companies were established as venture capital-backed startup companies, received funding from investment firms, sports broadcasters, leagues, and team owners, and became known for the aggressive marketing of their services. As of September 2015, both companies had an estimated value of at least $1 billion and controlled 95% of the U.S. DFS market. The two primarily compete against smaller DFS services, such as Fantasy Aces and Yahoo! Sports. The popularity of the daily fantasy format has been credited to its convenience in comparison to season-length games, as well as the focus on major cash prizes in the promotion of these services. Daily fantasy was also credited with helping to improve television viewership and engagement with sports.

DFS faced criticism over its semblance to sports betting; multiple U.S. states ruled that DFS contests constituted gambling and sports betting—which, at the time, was effectively illegal in most states under the Professional and Amateur Sports Protection Act of 1992—arguing that their elements of chance were predominant over those of skill, or how much control the player has over the outcome of the game. A New York State lawsuit, spawned from an investigation of allegations that DraftKings and FanDuel employees had used inside information to win cash prizes from each other, spawned retaliatory lawsuits from the companies. They argued that the rulings were the result of a misinterpretation of the nature of their services. By December 2017, 18 states, including Massachusetts and Virginia, had ruled that DFS was a legal game of skill.

In the U.S., these issues became largely moot in 2018, when the Professional and Amateur Sports Protection Act of 1992 was struck down in the Supreme Court lawsuit Murphy v. National Collegiate Athletic Association. With states free to legalize sports betting, DraftKings and FanDuel subsequently expanded into bookmakers to leverage their existing customer base and legal expertise, while FanDuel agreed to be acquired by Irish company Paddy Power Betfair to become its main U.S. subsidiary.

In the years following the legalization of sports betting, the industry diversified beyond the salary-cap contests pioneered by DraftKings and FanDuel. Operators such as PrizePicks, founded in Atlanta in 2015, grew by offering simplified pick'em-style contests in which users predict whether athletes will exceed or fall short of statistical projections. PrizePicks became the largest standalone daily fantasy sports operator in North America by the mid-2020s, operating in dozens of U.S. jurisdictions, including several states without legal sports betting. Other operators, including Underdog Fantasy, Betr, and Sleeper Fantasy, introduced alternative formats such as best ball drafts and peer-to-peer pick'em games. Beginning in 2023, regulators in multiple states scrutinized house-backed pick'em products, leading some operators to modify their contest structures or exit certain markets.

== Gameplay ==
There are several main disciplines of daily fantasy sports competitions, divided into two categories: cash games, and guaranteed prize pool (GPP). DFS contests typically utilize a salary cap format, in which players are allotted a maximum budget to spend on athletes for their team, represented as either play money or points. Each athlete has their own cost, with elite athletes having the highest costs.

In "Double-up" or "50/50" cash game competitions, players win a prize equal to double their entry fee if they finish with a score within the top 50% of all participants. Head-to-head competitions are similar, except that the player must win against another user of their choice. Guaranteed prize pool contests have higher stakes, using tiered payouts based on finishing in different percentiles or positions of the field of contestants. Further variations of double-up games, including Triple-up, Quadruple-up, and Quintuple-up, may also be offered. Leagues are smaller versions of GPP contests, with tiered payouts and a smaller number of contestants.

Daily fantasy games exist in a variety of major and minor sports, depending on service, including but not limited to American football (college and the NFL), association football (soccer), auto racing, baseball, basketball, cricket, golf, ice hockey, rugby, horse racing and sumo wrestling. Daily fantasy contests have also been held in professional-level e-sports events.

== History ==
=== Early examples ===
In the late 1980s and early 1990s, the company Phoneworks created nationwide fantasy games for a variety of sports, launching them in a variety of newspapers across the United States. Players chose their teams by calling a toll-free phone number and entering four-digit codes for each of their player selections. The games served as an early version of today's daily fantasy sports by rewarding each week's highest-scoring participants with prizes.

Among the first websites to specialize in the format of daily fantasy was Instant Fantasy Sports, established in 2007; the service's co-founder Chris Fargis explained that the service was inspired by the format of online poker, and that his goal was to "take the time frame of season-long fantasy sports leagues and shrink it." The site was later acquired by NBC Universal and re-branded as SnapDraft; NBC had also acquired the fantasy sports-focused website Rotoworld in 2006. SnapDraft was later shut down.

=== Growth ===
On July 21, 2009, the Edinburgh, Scotland-based prediction market game Hubdub launched a spin-off known as FanDuel; the service attempted to market itself as a modern alternative to the fantasy sports services provided by other media properties, such as Yahoo! Sports and CBSSports.com, with the daily fantasy format and integration with popular social networks. Its founder, Nigel Eccles, was inspired to create the site when he realized that the carve-out for fantasy sports in the U.S. Unlawful Internet Gambling Enforcement Act of 2006 did not state that a legal, paid fantasy sports competition had to last for an entire season. In February 2012, the Boston-based DraftKings was established by former VistaPrint executives Jason Robins, Matthew Kalish, and Paul Liberman. DraftKings gained a local, Somerville-based competitor in StarStreet, when it introduced a daily fantasy game of its own.

DraftKings and FanDuel in particular became the subjects of venture capital investments by various parties; in April 2013, Major League Baseball invested an undisclosed amount in DraftKings, becoming the first U.S. professional sports organization to invest in daily fantasy sports. In 2014, DraftKings acquired DraftStreet, as well as StarStreet, and raised another $41 million in investment led by The Raine Group, bringing the company to a total of $75 million in outside funding. FanDuel pursued investments as well, with an $11 million Series C funding round that included Comcast Ventures, a $70 million Series D round in September 2014 led by Shamrock Capital Advisors with participation from NBC Sports Ventures and KKR among others, and a Series E funding round of $275 million in July 2015, valuing the company at over $1 billion. In October 2014, NBC Sports entered into a content sharing partnership with the DFS information website Rotogrinders, in which it would provide daily fantasy-oriented content for Rotoworld.

DraftKings and FanDuel began to pursue advertising and endorsement deals with sports franchises and leagues; in November 2014, DraftKings entered into a multi-year sponsorship deal with the National Hockey League, complementing team-level sponsorship deals it had previously reached with seven NHL franchises. Also in November, the National Basketball Association acquired an equity stake in FanDuel and entered into a four-year sponsorship deal with the company. In April 2015, after the National Football League began to allow daily fantasy providers to sign multi-year team sponsorship deals, with caveats, FanDuel reached deals with sixteen NFL teams for placements on team-oriented digital properties, radio, and in-stadium. DraftKings had also received an investment by Robert Kraft—a local businessman whose holdings include the New England Patriots.

=== Mainstream popularity ===
By 2015, the daily fantasy sports industry had experienced a major growth in mainstream popularity. The rise was credited to several factors, including the convenience of the format, the ability to access the services on mobile devices, and aggressive marketing campaigns which promoted the prospective cash prizes of their largest contests. The structure and payouts of daily fantasy games have been described as providing a feeling of "instant gratification" to its players, similar to that of online gambling.

Writing for The New York Times Magazine, Jay Caspian Kang noted that despite its similarities to gambling, DFS appealed to mainstream sports fans because it evoked the feelings of community commonly associated with traditional fantasy sports, rather than the "shady underground games" of poker. The popularity of daily fantasy has also influenced fan engagement with sports; Fox Sports president Erik Shanks felt that daily fantasy sports help improve television viewership of sporting events, while FanDuel stated that players became more engaged with sports content after joining the service.

In July 2015, Yahoo!, a historic provider of season-length fantasy sports, announced that it would begin to offer paid daily and weekly fantasy games as part of its Yahoo! Sports website. Moneyball, one of the first Australian DFS services, was also established by former Fairfax Media employees James Fitzgerald and Rax Huq; the company secured $1.8 million in series A funding. Fitzgerald noted that the sports betting industry in Australia had brought in $900 million in yearly revenue and that DFS was "a more ethically and morally preferred means of partnership with a bookmaker."

In September 2015, DraftKings and FanDuel expanded their offerings into competitive video gaming; FanDuel acquired the e-sports focused DFS service AlphaDraft (which FanDuel planned to operate as an independent brand), while DraftKings added contests for the 2015 League of Legends World Championship.

=== Increased scrutiny ===
In 2015, daily fantasy sports began to face increased legal scrutiny. In August 2015, a class action lawsuit was filed against DraftKings, alleging that it engaged in false advertising in regards to a promotion in which the service claimed it would double a new user's first deposit. The suit alleged that DraftKings would only credit the deposit bonus to a player's account if they fulfill certain monetary and participation requirements within four months, causing them to "incur additional and substantial monetary obligations", rather than instantly receive the bonus as implied by advertising.

On October 6, 2015, following reports that a DraftKings employee had used inside information to win $350,000 on FanDuel, New York Attorney General Eric Schneiderman announced that he had opened an investigation into the two services and the allegations that employees from the two services were using this information to win prizes from each other. Both sites have since barred their employees from participating in daily fantasy games. On October 14, 2015, the FBI launched an investigation of its own into the two services regarding the inside information scandal.

In the wake of the scandal, multiple class-action lawsuits were filed against both DraftKings and FanDuel, with suits alleging charges such as fraud, racketeering, negligence, and false advertising, arguing that the employees' use of inside information had made the games unfair. One of the lawsuits were filed by a resident of New Orleans, despite paid fantasy games being illegal in the state. On October 30, 2015, Washington NFL player Pierre Garçon also filed a class-action lawsuit against FanDuel, arguing that the service had exploited his name and likeness without permission as part of its services and marketing. FanDuel objected to the lawsuit, arguing that its use of his likeness fell within existing case law surrounding the use of player names and statistics in fantasy sports games. Garçon's lawsuit was settled out of court.

In December 2015, Canadian media company TheScore launched QuickDraft, a daily fantasy game targeted at both Canada and the United States, based on the intellectual property of its 2014 acquisition of Swoopt. In contrast to other DFS services and in an effort to work around the increased scrutiny and uncertain legality of paid games, the service is being positioned as a free-to-play service with smaller cash prizes, a more "casual" atmosphere with fewer "sharks", and the possibility of being advertising-funded in the future.

DraftKings and FanDuel attempted to merge in 2017, but the deal was shelved after the U.S. Federal Trade Commission threatened to block it over concerns that the combined company would have a monopoly on paid DFS.

=== Legalization of sports betting in the United States ===
In May 2018, the Professional and Amateur Sports Protection Act of 1992—which outlawed state legalization of sports betting in most U.S. states (excluding grandfathered states such as Nevada)—was declared unconstitutional by the Supreme Court in Murphy v. National Collegiate Athletic Association. The following month, Delaware became the first state to create new legislation to allow sports betting, followed shortly by New Jersey.

Analysts predicted that the duopoly of DraftKings and FanDuel would make moves to capitalize on the decision, including leveraging their regulatory expertise and influence to lobby for state legalization of sports betting, and incorporating betting features into their platforms to take advantage of their existing market positions and brand recognition. Later that month, FanDuel announced that it would be acquired by Paddy Power Betfair, to bolster the Irish bookmaker's U.S. operations. Both DraftKings and FanDuel launched sports betting operations in New Jersey in August 2018.

=== Pick'em and prop-based contests ===
A distinct format from salary-cap contests, pick'em games present users with statistical projections for individual athletes and ask whether each player will exceed or fall short of the listed figure. Users typically combine multiple selections into a single entry, with payouts scaling based on the number of correct picks. The format has been described by industry observers as more accessible to casual players than traditional salary-cap daily fantasy, because it does not require roster construction under a budget.

PrizePicks, headquartered in Atlanta, was an early and prominent operator of this format in the United States. The company's contests allow users to select over/under predictions across major professional and college sports, as well as esports. PrizePicks has described its product as a daily fantasy sports offering rather than a sportsbook, which has allowed it to operate in jurisdictions where sports betting remained prohibited, including Georgia and Texas.

Other operators adopted similar pick'em mechanics, including Underdog Fantasy, Betr, and Sleeper Fantasy. DraftKings later introduced Pick6, a pick'em product offered through its licensed sportsbook platform. Pick'em contests differ from traditional daily fantasy salary-cap games in that they focus on individual player statistics rather than the combined performance of a user-assembled roster.

Some operators also offer peer-to-peer pick'em contests, in which users are matched against other players rather than against the platform. PrizePicks introduced a peer-to-peer product called Arena in response to regulatory actions in several states that classified house-backed pick'em games as sports wagering.

== Marketing ==
The aggressive marketing tactics used by daily fantasy services have also affected the growth of the industry. In June 2015, DraftKings entered into a three-year sponsorship deal with ESPN valued at $250 million; the deal gave DraftKings exclusivity in advertising daily fantasy services on ESPN networks beginning in January 2016, and included "integration" of the service into ESPN's television and digital content. DraftKings also entered into an advertising deal with Fox Sports; in exchange for Fox acquiring a $150 million equity stake in the company, DraftKings agreed to buy $250 million in advertising over the next three years. DraftKings' sponsorship exclusivity deal with ESPN was also to include the acquisition of an equity stake in the company, but this aspect of the deal was reportedly called off due to objections by ESPN's parent, The Walt Disney Company, over financially associating itself with activities that could be classified as gambling.

DraftKings and FanDuel also became known for their use of direct response advertising on television, especially during sports telecasts. Capitalizing on the start of football season, iSpot.tv estimated that DraftKings and FanDuel collectively spent over $107 million on television advertising in September 2015 alone—with nearly half being spent on advertising during National Football League telecasts ($23.6 million by DraftKings, and $26.7 million spent by FanDuel). Of the total, $60.1 million was spent by DraftKings, with $7.95 million spent during college football games, $2.05 million during ESPN's sports news program SportsCenter, and $1.36 million during South Park episodes. The marketing push was met with a negative reaction from viewers on social networks such as Twitter, who considered the repetitive airplay of DFS commercials during football games to be an annoyance.

The increased legal scrutiny surrounding DFS resulted in providers spending less on marketing in order to focus more on legal costs. On February 10, 2016, it was reported that ESPN had backed out of its advertising deal with DraftKings, and that Fox had marked down its investment in DraftKings by 60%—a loss of $95 million.

== Classification as gambling ==
There are conflicting arguments over whether paid daily fantasy sports games constitute gambling, due to its mixture of chance-based and skill-based elements. Critics of DFS have argued that because athlete performance can vary on a week-to-week basis, players are essentially wagering on the performance of individual athletes during a given game, rather than managing their team on a week-to-week basis across a season. On the other hand, proponents have argued that the act of preparing a daily fantasy team is an activity of skill, as it requires knowledge of the sport, its individual players and their respective performance at a particular moment in time, and the ability to select suitable players within the limitation of a salary cap.

In an "IAmA" thread on Reddit, DraftKings CEO Jason Robins described the service as being "almost identical to a casino", described the concept of DFS as a cross between fantasy sports and online poker, and repeatedly referred to the service using gambling-oriented terms such as "wager" and "betting". DraftKings and FanDuel have also entered into affiliation and sponsorship agreements with gambling-oriented entities; DraftKings sponsored the 2015 Belmont Stakes and the World Series of Poker, while FanDuel has affiliated with websites related to sports betting. At the same time, both companies have stated that their daily fantasy games represent a game of skill. In the 2007 federal lawsuit Humphrey v. Viacom, Inc., Judge Dennis M. Cavanaugh of the U.S. District Court of New Jersey distinguished an "entry fee" in a paid fantasy sports competition as being a fee required to participate rather than a "wager", because they are "paid unconditionally", and because the prizes in such games were "guaranteed" and determined in advance.

=== Skill of players ===
Bloomberg Businessweek acknowledged that daily fantasy contests are often won by a minority of skilled professional players, or "sharks", who employ "elaborate statistical modeling and automated tools that can manage hundreds of entries at once and identify the weakest opponents". A DFS player interviewed by Bloomberg argued that "no matter how much somebody knows about sports, if you put an established player up against a new player, that established player's probably going to have a 75 percent chance of winning—at least." A study by McKinsey & Company over the first half of the 2015 MLB season estimated that 91% of winnings were won by only 1.3% of players. FanDuel CEO Nigel Eccles disputed the accuracy of the study, arguing that its daily fantasy baseball contests do not have as many participants as those it runs for football.

Writing for The New York Times Magazine, Jay Caspian Kang argued that DFS games themselves were "not inherently crooked", explaining that "most of the benefits praised by its enthusiasts — the ease of play, the camaraderie among fans, the challenge of solving what amounts to a math puzzle — are real. It does take skill to parse game film, diligently follow the news and interpret the thousands of bits of sports information that are generated each night. If a problem gambler at the poker rooms I frequent in New York City were to hire a programmer and flood the D.F.S. market with his lineups, he would almost certainly hemorrhage money."

In response to these concerns, DFS services implemented changes to improve the fairness and transparency of their contests, including entry limits, banning off-site scripts, identifying veteran-level players, allowing users to block players they do not wish to compete against, and adding beginner-level contests intended for new users.

=== Legal definitions of gambling ===
In U.S. federal law, criminal gambling statutes include the Federal Wire Act—which prohibits interstate sports wagering, the Illegal Gambling Business Act (18 U.S.C. § 1955)—which prohibits the interstate conduct of wagering activity prohibited under state law, and the Unlawful Internet Gambling Enforcement Act (UIGEA)—which prohibits the transfer of funds in connection to online gambling that is prohibited under state law. The Professional and Amateur Sports Protection Act of 1992 also forbade all states, besides Nevada and other grandfathered states, from authorizing sports wagering activities, although it was ruled in May 2018 that this law was unconstitutional.

Each state applies varying standards in regards to determining whether a game is one of skill, or of chance; in most states, this determination is based on whether the skill-based elements of the game are predominant over those of chance, and whether these chance-based elements have more than an incidental effect on the outcome of the game (dominant factor test, material degree). Some states use stricter criteria, under which games whose outcomes are influenced by any element of chance, or appeal to a "gambling instinct", are considered games of chance, regardless of the presence of skill-based elements. Applying the predominance test, the Supreme Court of Illinois ruled that participants in daily fantasy contests are "actual contestants in the bona fide contest for the determination of skill" and do not violate Illinois' prohibition on gambling. The court disagreed with an Illinois Attorney General Opinion that interpreted "actual contestants" to mean the persons in the athletic contest.

In 2015, the Canadian Gaming Association commissioned an opinion on the legality of DFS in Canada from former Alcohol and Gaming Commission of Ontario general counsel Don Bourgeois. He determined that DFS would likely be classified as a game of chance under Canadian law, going on to say in an interview that under the Criminal Code of Canada, games that mix chance- and skill-based elements are considered games of chance. However, Canadian authorities have not yet targeted DFS services; historically, the government has only targeted illegal gambling operations that have a presence within the country. While the service Sport Select offers legal sports wagering games through Canada's lotteries, it is subject to a legal prohibition on wagering on individual sporting events.

==== UIGEA carve-out ====
The UIGEA has frequently been cited as having exempted daily fantasy games from being considered gambling, as the law does not consider an online contest with pre-determined prizes, and an outcome based on skill that is "determined predominantly by accumulated statistical results of sporting events, including any non-participant's individual performances in such sporting events", to be unlawful wagering. The carve-out was based on the language of an amendment proposed by Senator Richard Bryan to the failed Internet Gambling Prohibition Act.

The act itself does not define unlawful internet wagering, and expressly refrains from altering the legality of any underlying conduct other than funds transfers, meaning that state law remains binding. It also depends on banks to act as enforcers of the prohibitions. Congressman Jim Leach, who authored the UIGEA, explained that the fantasy sports carve-out was meant to relieve the burden of enforcement of the act by banks, nor cover the present-day daily fantasy industry, and that "it is sheer chutzpah for a fantasy sports company to cite the law as a legal basis for existing".

=== Self-imposed restrictions ===
Daily fantasy services have historically blocked residents of Arizona, Iowa, Louisiana, Montana and Washington from participating in paid games, under a presumption that DFS is illegal in these states due to the strictness of their gambling laws. However, a November 2015 investigation by The New York Times found that these geoblock restrictions could easily be circumvented using anonymous proxies, and it was estimated that in 2014, DraftKings had still collected $484,897 in entry fees from players in the five states where it had voluntarily asserted that DFS was illegal. These reports led to regulatory probes by investigators in the aforementioned states. Both websites have since implemented measures to block proxy users.

=== Legal opinions and challenges ===
Louisiana attempted to pass a law that would exempt fantasy sports from its anti-online gambling laws, but the bill was defeated as the result of lobbying by both the Louisiana Family Forum (which showed concerns that players could develop an addiction to daily fantasy games), and the Louisiana Video Gaming Association (which felt that DFS would cannibalize the legal video poker industry, and needed to be highly regulated).

On October 15, 2015, the Nevada Gaming Control Board published a memorandum ruling that daily fantasy sports games were a form of sports wagering, and that DFS services must cease serving customers in the state of Nevada until they obtain a sports pool license. The Board felt that DFS fell under the state's definitions of a "gambling game" and a "sports pool", as they "[accept] wagers on sporting events or other events by any system or method of wagering", including wagers on events occurring during a sporting event (props), combinations of multiple events occurring within an event (parlays), and against the performance of other players, with "rake-offs" taken by the operator on each wager (defined as a "percentage game" under Nevada law). In further support of its argument, the memorandum cited Jason Robins' comments on Reddit that described DraftKings using gambling-oriented terminology; the board stated that its classification was "consistent with how operators of certain daily fantasy sports describe themselves".

On January 17, 2016, Attorney General of Texas Ken Paxton issued an opinion, stating that "it is prohibited gambling in Texas if you bet on the performance of a participant in a sporting event and the house takes a cut." On the other hand, Paxton stated that traditional, season-length fantasy sports were legal. Prior to the ruling, it was also reported that Gary Grief, executive director of the Texas Lottery, had been investigating ways of integrating DFS into the state lottery system, including attempts to pursue DraftKings as a partner for a proposed game which would have offered credit for the service as prizes. FanDuel ceased serving residents of Texas, but DraftKings filed a request for declaratory judgment on March 4, 2016, seeking clarification on the matter.

On January 27, 2016, at the request of Senator Rosalyn Baker, Attorney General of Hawaii Doug Chin issued an opinion that DFS could be illegal under Hawaii law, as it involves a wager on an event outside of the player's control. He explained that "the technology may have changed, but the vice has not."

On April 5, 2016, Attorney General of Alabama Luther Strange ruled that DFS was illegal under state law, and sent cease and desist notices to DraftKings and FanDuel ordering them to stop serving residents of Alabama by May 1, 2016. He argued that while picking players for a fantasy team is an activity of skill, player performance can vary, and Alabama law dictates that it is illegal to risk something of value on any game with an element of chance.

==== Legalization ====
In September 2015, the state of Massachusetts tabled a bill exploring the possibility of allowing the Massachusetts Lottery to run online, skill-based games, such as daily fantasy sports. On November 19, 2015, the government announced that it would allow daily fantasy sports services to operate within Massachusetts under proposed regulations, including the requirement for all players to be 21 and over, banning members of the professional sports industry from playing the games (including athletes), and banning the marketing of the services in colleges and high schools.

On March 7, 2016, the state of Virginia passed legislation regulating "fantasy contests", defined as skill-based games with cash prizes that are based on the "accumulated statistical results of the performance of individuals"; the law makes no reference to sports or DFS. Services must pay a $50,000 registration fee, be restricted to those who are 18 and older, and be subject to yearly independent audits. The law was criticized for being broadly-worded, with critics believing that it could feasibly apply to season-length games or any similar activities, and that the required licensing fee adds a financial barrier for doing business in the state.

On May 10, 2016, it was reported that the U.S. House Subcommittee on Commerce, Manufacturing and Trade was planning to discuss the legal aspects of DFS in a hearing.

In August 2016, New York became the largest state to legalize daily fantasy sports. Nearby New Jersey and Pennsylvania each followed suit in mid-2017.

By the end of 2017, 18 different states had legalized paid-entry fantasy sports contests. Governor John Kasich of Ohio signed a bill in late December making Ohio the eighteenth.

==== New York ruling and lawsuit ====
On November 10, 2015, Attorney General of New York State Eric Schneiderman issued a cease-and-desist order to DraftKings and FanDuel, arguing that DFS was illegal under state law (which specifies that games where players "risk something of value" and do not have "control or influence" over the outcome, are gambling), and ordering the two services to cease serving residents of New York. He stated that DFS "wagers" represented "a wager on a 'contest of chance' where winning or losing depends on numerous elements of chance to a 'material degree'". He characterized the DFS industry as being a "massive, multi-billion-dollar scheme intended to evade the law and fleece sports fans across the country", causing the "same public health and economic problems associated with gambling, particularly for populations prone to gambling addiction and individuals who are unprepared to sustain losses, lured by the promise of easy money."

In response, DraftKings and FanDuel filed lawsuits against the state of New York on November 13, arguing that their games were one of skill, they had been denied due process due to the Attorney General's abruptness, that he does not have the power to make such a ruling, and that Schneiderman engaged in tortious interference by sending cease and desist notices to their payment processors. On November 16, the two services tried to request a temporary restraining order to prevent Schneiderman from enforcing the cease-and-desist, but a state judge declared their request to be premature. Following the hearing, a spokesperson for the Attorney General declared that he could file a formal lawsuit against the two sites "as soon as tomorrow". The same day, state senator Michael Ranzenhofer introduced a bill that would explicitly classify daily fantasy sports as a game of skill.

On November 17, 2015, the Attorney General filed a request for a temporary injunction to force DraftKings and FanDuel to cease serving customers in the state of New York. In the filing, Schneiderman argued that DFS was merely a "re-branding" of sports betting, and in response to claims that DFS constitutes a game of skill, he argued that "a few good players in a poker tournament may rise to the top based on their skill; but the game is still gambling." Schneiderman also acknowledged that the two services had "basic compliance issues" (alluding to the inside information scandal), had associated themselves with gambling-oriented entities, and that DraftKings had accepted entry fees from users in states where it argued that DFS was illegal. The Attorney General also issued a subpoena for information from Yahoo! in regards to its own daily fantasy offerings. FanDuel stated that it would comply with the order and restrict participation by residents of New York, while DraftKings stated that it would continue to serve them, arguing that Schneiderman's decision was based on an "incomplete understanding of the facts about how our business operates and a fundamental misinterpretation and misapplication of the law".

During hearings on November 25, 2015, Judge Manuel J. Mendez disputed assertions by the services that a player's choice of athletes represents "control or influence" over the outcome, stating that players are ultimately "relying on someone else's skill" to determine an outcome. On December 11, 2015, the temporary injunction was granted, forbidding DraftKings and FanDuel from "accepting entry fees, wagers or bets" from residents of New York state. Mandez argued that "the payment of an 'entry fee' as high as $10,600 on one or more contests daily could certainly be deemed risking 'something of value'." He also ruled that the UIGEA "has no corresponding authority under New York State law". However, Mandez granted a temporary stay following requests for an appeal. On December 31, 2015—prior to an appeals court on whether they could continue to operate during the lawsuit, the Attorney General amended the lawsuit to demand that the two companies pay restitution—including the return of all money collected from customers in New York State. Schneiderman also acknowledged the services' deceptive advertising practices, such as "convoluted" first deposit bonuses.

On January 11, 2016, DraftKings' and FanDuel's stay was granted, meaning that they could continue to serve New York residents, pending the outcome of the appeal. However, later that month, Vantiv announced that it would no longer provide its payment processing services to the DFS industry, and in early-February 2016, Citigroup announced that it would no longer process payments for DraftKings and FanDuel made by residents of New York State, "pending a final decision by the courts".

The Boston Globe believed that a ruling on the legality of DFS in New York State would have industry-wide implications, as it is one of the largest markets for these services. Writing for The New Yorker, James Surowiecki believed that it was hypocritical for the state of New York to campaign against daily fantasy sports—which, in an op-ed, the Attorney General classified as a "particularly pernicious" activity, as the state already sponsors and/or endorses other forms of legal gambling based purely on chance rather than a mix of chance and skill, such as the state lottery, casinos, and horse racing. Surowiecki argued that "given the absence of a good argument for why daily fantasy should be illegal in New York, while the lottery and racetrack betting and casinos are not, the best strategy that DraftKings and FanDuel could pursue might be to get the State Legislature to eliminate the inconsistency and explicitly legalize them."

On March 21, 2016, the Attorney General announced a partial settlement of its lawsuit, under which DraftKings and FanDuel agreed to cease offering paid games in the state of New York, and abide by the result of an upcoming appeals court hearing. The hearings, which would determine whether the services would have to pay restitution, were tentatively scheduled for September 2016—assuming that legislation legalizing daily fantasy sports was not passed by then. DraftKings and FanDuel spokespersons stated that the companies were working with local officials and supporting legislation to legalize DFS under state law. This settlement does not address the false advertising claims, which are still being pursued. The next day, Yahoo announced that it would voluntarily comply with the settlement and also cease offering paid games in the state of New York.

On June 18, 2016, the New York State senate approved legislation to legalize daily fantasy sports. Daily fantasy providers will be required to pay 15.5% of their annual revenue to the New York Lottery's education fund in order to serve customers in the state.

=== League policies ===
The NCAA considers all paid fantasy games—including daily fantasy—to fall under its prohibition of sports wagering by student athletes, punishable by ineligibility to participate in NCAA-sanctioned athletics for one year. Advertising for daily fantasy services are also forbidden from being broadcast during telecasts of the NCAA's tournaments. In August 2015, the NCAA and a group of ten conferences jointly campaigned against daily fantasy games featuring college sports, asserting that DFS is inconsistent with the NCAA's policies and values. The SEC had discussions with its broadcast partners in an attempt to discourage the advertising of daily fantasy games during its telecasts, while both Big Ten Network and Pac-12 Network prohibited advertising for daily fantasy games involving college sports. On December 9, 2015, it was reported that ESPN had similarly agreed not to air advertising for daily fantasy services during telecasts of the College Football Playoff. On March 31, 2016, DraftKings and FanDuel jointly agreed to stop offering daily fantasy college sports following the conclusion of the 2016 NCAA Men's Division I Basketball Tournament.

The NFL does not outright ban participation in paid or daily fantasy sports games by its players and staff, but does restrict how much one may win in such games.

The PGA Tour previously prohibited its players from participation in paid DFS games involving golf, or endorsing DFS companies. In 2019, the PGA Tour changed its rules to allow players to endorse casinos and other legal gaming operators, but within the United States players cannot endorse a company whose "primary purpose" is sports betting. The new policy specifically cited DraftKings and FanDuel as examples of companies allowed under the new rules, and FanDuel would subsequently reach a sponsorship deal naming it the official sports betting operator of the PGA Tour.

FanDuel's terms of service bans any athlete, coach, referee, or owner from entering contests for the sport in which they are involved with. Furthermore, DraftKings announced that CFL players were not allowed to enter any CFL contests shortly after announcing their partnership with the league.

== See also ==
- Skin gambling
