= Arch West =

American businessman

Archibald Clark West (September 8, 1914 – September 20, 2011) was a marketing executive credited with the development of Doritos, a brand of seasoned tortilla chips. The successful snack food was marketed as an alternative to the more traditional potato chips. Doritos are now Frito-Lay's second best-selling item, bested only by Lay's Potato Chips. An estimated five billion dollars in Doritos are sold every year worldwide.

== Biography ==
=== Early life ===
West was born on September 8, 1914, in Indianapolis, Indiana. His parents, James and Jessie West, were immigrants from Scotland. West and his brother were raised at a Masonic home because his mother was too impoverished to care for them.

He received a bachelor's degree in business from Franklin College in Indiana in 1936. West was also a member of Kappa Delta Rho during his time at FC. West then served in the United States Navy in the Pacific theater during World War II as a gunnery officer aboard the USS Holt.

=== Career ===
He began his career at Standard Brands, where he worked as a traveling sales representative. West then switched careers to advertising, based in New York City. His early portfolio included the Jell-O ad campaign.

Arch West joined the staff of the Frito Company, now called Frito-Lay, in 1960. (Pepsi acquired Frito-Lay in 1965.) West is widely credited for the invention and development of one of the company's signature products, Doritos. According to West's daughter, Jana Hacker, West first envisioned the idea of Doritos in the early 1960s while working as Frito's vice president of marketing. West was vacationing with his family in San Diego, California, in 1961, when he noticed customers at a small, roadside restaurant eating corn chips that had been deep fried. West reportedly enjoyed the taste of this type of snack food.

Almost simultaneously, Frito merged with the H.W. Lay Company in 1961. West pitched the idea for Doritos soon after. His colleagues at Frito-Lay were initially not enthusiastic about his idea for a snack food made from tortilla chips. However, West conducted market research and development which revealed a potential market for his proposed snack. The company produced the first Doritos chips in 1964. West developed the snack as a triangle-shaped, crispy tortilla chip flavored with chilli and cheese. The shape and signature orange color of the chips were inspired by West's fraternity at Franklin, Kappa Delta Rho. The first flavors of Doritos were corn and taco and an early television commercial called Doritos "a swinging, Latin sort of snack." The food historian Andrew F. Smith noted West's credited contributions to Doritos in his 2006 book, Encyclopedia of Junk Food and Fast Food.

West also had a hand in the marketing of Pace salsas and picante sauces. He was a longtime friend of Dave Pace, the founder of Pace Foods. West suggested that Pace's products be displayed on the same grocery aisle as the chips, rather than with ketchup. The move quickly increased sales of Pace products.

West retired from his position as vice president of marketing at Frito-Lay in 1971.

=== Later life ===
West was injured in a car accident while volunteering for disaster relief in Amarillo, Texas, circa 1990, but recovered from his injuries. His car was hit by a tanker truck in the accident.

Arch West died from peritonitis and complications from vascular surgery at Presbyterian Hospital of Dallas on September 20, 2011, at the age of 97. He and his wife, Charlotte F. Thomson (died 2010), had four children.
