= List of Kappa Delta Rho chapters =

Kappa Delta Rho is collegiate social fraternity established at Middlebury College in 1905. In the following list, active chapters are indicated in bold and inactive chapters are in italics.

Chapter	Charter date and range	Institution	Location	Status	Ref.
Alpha	May 17, 1905 – 1990; 2000–2015	Middlebury College	Middlebury, Vermont	Inactive	(Note: After going dormant, the chapter reformed from the Kappa Delta Rho Society (local), established in 1990.)
**Beta**	May 24, 1913 –1943; 1950–1952; 1956 ?	Cornell University	Ithaca, New York	Active	
Gamma	June 10, 1915 – 1952	University at Albany, SUNY	Albany, New York	Inactive	
Delta	February 22, 1917 – 1972; 1985 – 2004	Colgate University	Hamilton, New York	Inactive	
**Epsilon**	May 24, 1919 –1972; 1983	Franklin College	Franklin, Indiana	Active	(Note: Chapter formed from Phi Alpha Pi (local), established in 1909. After going dormant, it reformed as a colony in 1979.)
Zeta	March 12, 1920 – 2015	Pennsylvania State University	State College, Pennsylvania	Inactive	(Note: Chapter formed from Chi Alpha Pi Zeta (local), established in 1917.)
Eta	February 18, 1921 – 1990; 1994 – 2024	University of Illinois Urbana-Champaign	Champaign, Illinois	Inactive	(Note: Chapter formed from Delta Pi (local), established in 1919. After going dormant, it reformed as a colony in 1992.)
**Theta**	February 19, 1921	Purdue University	West Lafayette, Indiana	Active	(Note: Chapter formed from Epsilon Zeta Psi (local), established in 1920.)
Iota	November 10, 1921 – 1987; 1991–2009; 2014	Bucknell University	Lewisburg, Pennsylvania	Inactive	(Note: Chapter formed from Epsilon Lambda Sigma (local), established in 1903. After going dormant, it reformed as a colony in 1988 and 2012.)
**Kappa**	May 20, 1922 – 1976; 2021	Ohio State University	Columbus, Ohio	Active	(Note: Chapter formed from the Chums Club (local), established in 1922. After going dormant, it reformed as a colony in 2018.)
**Lambda**	February 22, 1924 – 2012; 2019	University of California, Berkeley	Berkeley, California	Active	(Note: Chapter formed from the Delphic Club (local), established in 1921. After going dormant, it reformed as a colony in 2015.)
Mu	May 23, 1925 – 1943; 1988–199x ?	University of Michigan	Ann Arbor, Michigan	Inactive	(Note: Chapter formed from Chyron (local), established in 1922.)
**Nu**	April 9, 1926	Indiana University	Bloomington, Indiana	Active	(Note: Chapter formed from Sigma Eta Chi (local), established in 1924.)
Xi	May 29, 1926 – 1983	Colby College	Waterville, Maine	Inactive	(Note: Chapter formed from Pi Delta Phi (local), established in 1917.)
Omicron	January 7, 1928 – 1937	Butler University	Indianapolis, Indiana	Inactive	(Note: Chapter formed from Kappa Delta Pi (local), established in 1928.)
Pi	January 14, 1928 – 1974	Gettysburg College	Gettysburg, Pennsylvania	Inactive	(Note: Chapter formed from Theta Phi (local), established in 1909.)
**Rho**	February 11, 1928 – 2011	Lafayette College	Easton, Pennsylvania	Colony	(Note: Chapter formed from the Krescent Club (local), established in 1923. It absorbed the Tams (local), established in 1931.)
Sigma	May 12, 1928 – 1992; 2013–2020	Oregon State University	Corvallis, Oregon	Inactive	(Note: Chapter formed from Alpha Pi Delta (local), established in 1919.)
Tau	May 16, 1930 – 1939; 1987–2009	Carnegie Mellon University	Pittsburgh, Pennsylvania	Inactive	(Note: Chapter formed from Delta Mu (local), established in 1921. After going dormant, it reformed as a colony in 1985.)
Upsilon	October 15, 1939 – 1956	Fresno State College	Fresno, California	Inactive	
Phi	May 13, 1950 – 1954	University of Oklahoma	Norman, Oklahoma	Inactive	(Note: Chapter formed from Gamma Mu Theta (local), established in 1948)
Chi	January 20, 1952 – xxxx ?	University of Florida	Gainesville, Florida	Inactive	
Psi	May 30, 1953 – 2016	Lycoming College	Williamsport, Pennsylvania	Inactive	(Note: Chapter formed from Theta Pi Pi (local), established in 1896.)
**Omega**	April 24, 1955 – 2005; 2018	Indiana University of Pennsylvania	Indiana, Pennsylvania	Active	(Note: Chapter formed from Delta Gamma Tau (local), established in 1952. After going dormant, it reformed as a colony in 2015.)
**Alpha Alpha**	April 26, 1958 – 1980; 1988	Lock Haven University of Pennsylvania	Lock Haven, Pennsylvania	Active	(Note: Chapter formed from Epsilon Omega Alpha (local), established in 1957. After going dormant, it reformed as a colony in 1987.)
Beta Alpha	March 26, 1960 – 1973; 1982–1988	LIU Post	Brookville, New York	Inactive	(Note: Chapter formed from Kappa Phi (local), established in 1956. After going dormant, it reformed as a colony in 1980.)
Gamma Alpha	January 7, 1967 – 1981	Bradley University	Peoria, Illinois	Inactive	
Delta Alpha	May 17, 1969 – 1973	Rhode Island College	Providence, Rhode Island	Inactive	(Note: Chapter formed from Delta Tau Chi (local), established in 1967.)
Epsilon Alpha	February 13, 1971 – 1980	Lewis University	Romeoville, Illinois	Inactive	(Note: Chapter formed from the K. of C. Club (local), established in 1964.)
Zeta Alpha	March 27, 1971 – 1973	University of Dayton	Dayton, Ohio	Inactive	(Note: Chapter formed from Theta Beta Kappa (local), established in 1969.)
**Eta Alpha**	April 3, 1981	Robert Morris University	Pittsburgh, Pennsylvania	Active	(Note: Chapter formed from Alpha Psi (local), established in 1975.)
**Theta Alpha**	April 4, 1981 – 2004; 2014	Slippery Rock University	Slippery Rock, Pennsylvania	Active	
**Iota Alpha**	March 27, 1982	University of Pittsburgh at Johnstown	Johnstown, Pennsylvania	Active	
Kappa Alpha	April 12, 1982 – 1993	Illinois State University	Normal, Illinois	Inactive	
Lambda Alpha	November 13, 1982 – 1997	Gannon University	Erie, Pennsylvania	Inactive	
Mu Alpha	April 24, 1982 – 1988; 1991–1997	West Virginia University	Morgantown, West Virginia	Inactive	
**Nu Alpha**	May 1, 1982	Columbia University	New York City, New York	Active	
**Xi Alpha**	April 29, 1984 – 1998; 2009	Temple University	Philadelphia, Pennsylvania	Active	
Omicron Alpha	April 7, 1984 – 1996; 2012–2020	Rutgers University	New Brunswick, New Jersey	Inactive	
**Pi Alpha**	May 18, 1984	University of Toledo	Toledo, Ohio	Active	
Rho Alpha	April 19, 1985 – 1992	Bryant University	Smithfield, Rhode Island	Inactive	
Sigma Alpha	April 20, 1985 – 1996	Hofstra University	Hempstead, New York	Inactive	
Tau Alpha	October 19, 1985 – 202x ?	Radford University	Radford, Virginia	Inactive	
Upsilon Alpha	March 22, 1986 – 2010	Saint Louis University	St. Louis, Missouri	Inactive	
Phi Alpha	March 21, 1987 – 2007	Penn West Clarion	Clarion, Pennsylvania	Inactive	
Chi Alpha	April 23, 1987 – 1991	University of Pittsburgh at Greensburg	Greensburg, Pennsylvania	Inactive	
Psi Alpha	November 14, 1986 – 2022	Penn State Erie, The Behrend College	Erie, Pennsylvania	Inactive	
**Omega Alpha**	May 1, 1987 – 1996; 2016	Virginia Commonwealth University	Richmond, Virginia	Active	
**Alpha Beta**	December 12, 1986	University of Delaware	Newark, Delaware2	Active	
Beta Beta	April 1, 1989 – 1999	Ball State University	Muncie, Indiana	Inactive	(Note: Chapter formed from Delta Rho (local), established in 1986.)
**Gamma Beta**	April 7, 1989 – 1998; 2010–2016; Fall 2021	Virginia Tech	Blacksburg, Virginia	Active	(Note: Chapter withdrew and became Omega Alpha Kappa (local). Later, it reformed.)
Delta Beta	November 3, 1989 – 1997	West Liberty University	West Liberty, West Virginia	Inactive	(Note: Chapter formed from the Community Service Club (local).)
**Epsilon Beta**	April 14, 1989	Old Dominion University	Norfolk, Virginia	Active	
**Zeta Beta**	April 22, 1989	Tarleton State University	Stephenville, Texas	Active	(Note: Chapter formed from Sigma Rho (local), established in 1987.)
**Eta Beta**	December 8, 1989	West Chester University	West Chester, Pennsylvania	Active	
Theta Beta	April 27, 1990 – 1997	New York Institute of Technology	Old Westbury, New York	Inactive	
**Iota Beta**	May 10, 1990	Rochester Institute of Technology	Henrietta, New York	Active	
Kappa Beta	November 16, 1990	Pennsylvania Western University, Edinboro	Edinboro, Pennsylvania	Inactive	
**Lambda Beta**	February 2, 1991 – 2005; 2015	James Madison University	Harrisonburg, Virginia	Active	
Mu Beta	March 16, 1991 – 2006	Syracuse University	Syracuse, New York	Inactive	
Nu Beta	April 26, 1991 – 1992	Fordham University	New York City, New York	Inactive	
Xi Beta	February 8, 1992 – 1997	University of Pittsburgh	Pittsburgh, Pennsylvania	Inactive	
Omicron Beta	February 15, 1992 – 2009	William Paterson University	Wayne, New Jersey	Inactive	
Pi Beta	April 10, 1992 – 1998	Stockton University	Galloway Township, New Jersey	Inactive	
Rho Beta	April 25, 1992 – 1997	Eastern Illinois University	Charleston, Illinois	Inactive	
Sigma Beta	October 23, 1992 – 2019	University of North Carolina at Greensboro	Greensboro, North Carolina	Inactive	(Note: Reformed as a colony in 2022.)
Tau Beta	January 21, 1994 – 1997	East Tennessee State University	Johnson City, Tennessee	Inactive	
**Upsilon Beta**	October 15, 1994 – 2004; 2023	Clemson University	Clemson, South Carolina	Colony	
**Phi Beta**	April 29, 1994	College of William & Mary	Williamsburg, Virginia	Active	
**Chi Beta**	March 4, 1995 – 2007	University of Charleston	Charleston, West Virginia	Colony	(Note: Reformed as a colony in 2021.)
**Psi Beta**	April 26, 1996	East Stroudsburg University of Pennsylvania	Stroudsburg, Pennsylvania	Active	
Omega Beta	April 11, 1997 – 2006	University of North Carolina at Asheville	Asheville, North Carolina	Inactive	
Alpha Gamma	April 15, 2000 – 2019	University of Detroit Mercy	Detroit, Michigan	Inactive	
**Beta Gamma**	October 28, 2006	Christopher Newport University	Newport News, Virginia	Active	
**Gamma Gamma**	December 2, 2006	York College of Pennsylvania	York, Pennsylvania	Active	
Delta Gamma	2009 ?	McDaniel College	Westminster, Maryland	Inactive	(Note: As of 7 Sept 2023, this chapter is missing from the lists on the Baird's Archive and the national website.)
Epsilon Gamma	August 5, 2011 – 2020	University of Texas Permian Basin	Odessa, Texas	Inactive	
Zeta Gamma	August 3, 2012 – 2021	Bloomsburg University of Pennsylvania	Bloomsburg, Pennsylvania	Inactive	
**Eta Gamma**	January 24, 2015	Angelo State University	San Angelo, Texas	Active	(Note: Chapter formed as a colony in 2012.)
Theta Gamma	2018 – 2022	Purdue University Fort Wayne	Fort Wayne, Indiana	Inactive	
**Iota Gamma**	November 18, 2018	Towson University	Towson, Maryland	Active	
**Kappa Gamma**	January 22, 2022	Arizona State University	Tempe, Arizona	Active	(Note: Chapter formed as a colony in 2018.)
Lambda Gamma	October 26, 2019-2024	Frostburg State University	Frostburg, Maryland	Inactive	
Mu Gamma	January 20, 2017 – 20xx ?	Texas Tech University	Lubbock, Texas	Inactive	
**Nu Gamma**	November 20, 2021	The College of New Jersey	Ewing Township, New Jersey	Active	(Note: Chapter formed as a colony in 2017.)
