= Xpressbet =

Xpressbet, LLC
- Company type: Private
- Industry: Gambling
- Founded: 2002; 24 years ago
- Headquarters: Washington, Pennsylvania, United States
- Area served: United States
- Key people: Richard Peden, co-president Dan Newman, co-president
- Products: Xpressbet, XBSelect, XBNet, XBGlobal XBRewards
- Services: Online/mobile horse racing wagering service
- Parent: Stronach Group Company
- Website: www.xpressbet.com

Xpressbet, LLC is a subsidiary of Stronach Group Company founded in 2002 and based in Washington, Pennsylvania. The company provides pari-mutuel action services that enable account holders to watch and wager on thoroughbred, harness, and quarter horse racing virtually. The company also provides handicapping resources, such as daily picks, wagering guides, newsletters, blogs, and columns. Xpressbet, LLC provides wagering services to nearly 200 racetracks in North America, Australia, Europe, South Africa, and the Middle East. It also offers back-end or white label wagering services for other Account Deposit Wagering (ADW) suppliers.

== History ==
In April 1983, the Meadows, the first pari-mutuel horse racing track in Western Pennsylvania, launched Call-A-Bet, which allowed patrons to wager through personal telephone accounts. In November 1983, the Meadows Racing Network, a satellite television station that pumped a 12-race card into 270,000 Pennsylvania homes and complemented the Call-A-Bet system, was introduced. 18% stake of the Meadows Racing Network was later sold to Toronto-based Magna Entertainment Corp (MEC) as part of a $53 million deal. Frank Stronach, the chairman of Magna, said, "The acquisition of the Call-A-Bet account wagering system, together with Ladbroke's other Pennsylvania horse racing operations, is an important step in MEC's strategic plan of building the premier account wagering business in the country. By acquiring the existing Call-A-Bet system, which already has a profitable operating history, MEC will significantly advance its electronic media strategy and realize an immediate improvement in its earnings per share."

Call-A-Bet later added an internet wagering service and was renamed to XpressBet. In March 2002, Ron Luniewski, then co-chief executive officer of online advance-deposit wagering company called Youbet.com (later acquired by Churchill Downs), resigned to serve as CEO of XpressBet.

On April 20, 2018, Ron Luniewski left the company. As of his exit, XpressBet's handle grew to $782.6 million in 2017.

== List of notable participating tracks ==
* Indicates a racetrack with direct partnership through the Stronach Group

(listed alphabetically):

- Aintree
- Ajax Downs
- Arapahoe Park
- Arlington Park
- Ascot Racecourse
- Belmont Park
- Belterra Park
- Churchill Downs
- Del Mar Racetrack
- Fair Grounds Race Course
- Fair Meadows Race Track
- Fairmount Park
- Golden Gate Fields*
- Gulfstream Park*
- Happy Valley Racecourse
- Hawthorne Race Course
- Indiana Downs
- Keeneland
- Kentucky Downs
- Laurel Park Racecourse
- Louisiana Downs
- Meadowlands Racetrack
- Mohegan Pennsylvania
- Monmouth Park
- Mountaineer Park
- Parx
- Pimlico Race Course*
- Portland Meadows*
- Rosecroft Raceway*
- Santa Anita Park*
- Saratoga Race Course
- Windsor Racecourse
- Woodbine Racetrack
