= FanDuel TV =

American pay television network

- Country: United States
- Broadcast area: Nationwide

Programming
- Language: English
- Picture format: 720p (HDTV); 480i (SDTV)

Ownership
- Owner: FanDuel
- Sister channels: FanDuel Racing, FanDuel Sports Network

History
- Launched: July 14, 1999 (as TVG)
- Closed: 2027 (planned)
- Former names: TVG (1999–2022)

Links
- Website: www.fanduel.com/tv

FanDuel TV (formerly TVG) is an American sports betting-oriented digital cable and satellite television network owned by FanDuel Group, the American subsidiary of Irish bookmaker Flutter Entertainment. It primarily airs live coverage of American and international horse racing, as well as studio shows focused on mainstream sports from the perspective of sports betting.

The network was originally known as TVG, which primarily focused on horse racing. In 2008, the network was sold to Betfair. It acquired its main competitor, HRTV, in 2015; the network was renamed TVG2 that October. In 2018, the channel began to add studio programs devoted to mainstream sports from the perspective of sports betting. In 2022, the network was relaunched as FanDuel TV, which expanded this programming strategy and began forays into live sports coverage outside of horse racing. The TVG brand continues to be used for the network's wagering platform.

In March 2026, it was announced that FanDuel TV would close by the end of 2027.

== History ==
=== TVG (1999–2022) ===
TVG logo used from 1999 to 2022

The direct predecessor of FanDuel TV was TVG (short for Television Games Network), launched on July 14, 1999, as joint venture of TV Guide Inc. (which at the time was owned by both Liberty Media and News Corp), the National Thoroughbred Racing Association, and AT&T Broadband.

In May 2006, TVG introduced several original programs to its schedule, including Morning Line, Fandicapping, :58 Flat, Lady Luck, and Drive Time.

The channel formerly operated a fictional betting site, TVGfree.net, which allowed it to have a presence in the fifteen states that prohibit televised and off-track betting, operating similarly to poker sites that use the .net domain to differentiate their fictional betting sites from the .com sites that allow gambling. The website was discontinued in early 2012, due to an upgrade and was redirected to TVG.com.

At the end of February 2007, TVG ended its longtime affiliation with Churchill Downs Incorporated. On May 2, 2008, Gemstar-TV Guide was acquired by Macrovision (now TiVo Corporation) for $2.8 billion.

Macrovision, which purchased Gemstar-TV Guide to increase the value of VCR scheduling codes and electronic program guide patents, stated that it was considering a sale of TVG, TV Guide Network, and the TV Guide print edition's namesake to other parties several months after the acquisition.

At the end of 2008, Macrovision sold TVG to British bookmaker Betfair for $50 million. The deal was completed on January 27, 2009, separating the channel from the company, which acquired its founding owner in 2007. In February 2015, Betfair acquired TVG's sole competitor, HRTV, and began to consolidate it into TVG's facilities. The network was rebranded as a sister network, TVG2, in October 2015.

In July 2018, the network announced that it was developing studio programs dedicated to sports betting. The U.S. Supreme Court had overturned the Professional and Amateur Sports Protection Act of 1992 earlier in the year, allowing for wider state legalization of sports betting in the United States. Paddy Power Betfair had also acquired the daily fantasy sports service FanDuel with the intent to use it as its main U.S. subsidiary. On September 9, 2018, coinciding with the 2018 NFL season, TVG Network premiered the Sunday morning programs The Barstool Sports Advisors and More Ways to Win.

The network had an increase in prominence during the COVID-19 pandemic, as the suspension of nearly all other live sports prompted increased interest in horse racing and off-track betting at tracks that remained active. The limited tracks available resulted in greater prominence given to smaller tracks and meets such as Nebraska's Fonner Park and Oklahoma's Will Rogers Downs, and the network's personalities made efforts to explain the technical terminology associated with horse racing and betting to accommodate new viewers. TVG also reached an agreement with NBCSN to simulcast a block of Trackside Live on Friday, Saturday, and Sunday afternoons.

=== FanDuel TV (2022–present) ===
In July 2022, it was reported that FanDuel was planning to relaunch TVG Network as FanDuel TV by September 2022, with the success of More Ways to Win, the network introduced a morning block of sports talk shows, as well as sports news segments interspersed throughout its live racing block. The service would compete primarily against VSiN, which was acquired by FanDuel's main U.S. competitor, DraftKings.

FanDuel officially announced the relaunch on August 25, 2022. With the rebranding, the network launched two new weekday studio shows; Up & Adams, a morning show hosted by former NFL Network anchor Kay Adams, and Run It Back, an NBA-focused program hosted by Michelle Beadle, Shams Charania, Chandler Parsons, and Lou Williams, which aired on Monday, Tuesday, and Wednesdays. FanDuel also announced shows developed by Pat McAfee's PMI Network, and a content deal with The Ringer. The network also expanded its live sports programming into international basketball via an agreement with Sportradar, adding coverage of Australia's National Basketball League, the Chinese Basketball Association, France's LNB, and Germany's Basketball Bundesliga. The rebranding was completed in September 2022, with TVG renamed FanDuel TV and TVG2 renamed FanDuel Racing.

In April 2024, the channel launched FanDuel TV Extra, a streaming free ad-supported streaming television (FAST) channel featuring a selection of the channel's studio programs and live sports events. FanDuel TV also began to syndicate its original programming on YouTube and via other broadcasters, reaching deals to air Up & Adams on MSG Network, TruTV, and HBO Max.

On October 21, 2024, as part of an agreement with Main Street Sports Group (formerly Diamond Sports Group), the Bally Sports regional sports networks were rebranded as FanDuel Sports Network (FDSN). FDSN was separate from FanDuel TV, with FanDuel only serving as a naming rights partner, and Main Street remaining the owner and operator of the networks as they were under the Bally branding. However, the networks carried FanDuel TV's syndicated studio programs, and FanDuel Group received an option to acquire an equity stake of up to 5% in Main Street after it recovered from bankruptcy.

=== Planned closure ===
In March 2026, FanDuel announced that the company plans to close FanDuel TV by the end of 2027, citing that the channel did not fit into its long-term business strategy. The channel initially downsized its racing coverage, eliminated 60% of its workforce in June 2026, and the remainder in November 2026, following the Breeders' Cup. The channel then only carried straight simulcasts of feeds from its partner tracks, with no accompanying studio segments or on-site coverage, before shutting down by the end of 2027. The shutdown will not impact FanDuel and TVG's betting operations, nor the non-racing studio programming it introduced after the rebranding (which FanDuel considers to be complimentary to its sportsbook business, and will continue to distribute through digital platforms and syndication). FanDuel TV fulfilled existing broadcast obligations for on-site events in 2026, including the Triple Crown and the Breeders' Cup, as well as race meets from tracks including Keeneland and Del Mar. The planned closure marks the second national FanDuel branded channel to close, following FanDuel Sports Network in September 2026.
