= Roger Huston =

American harness race caller

Roger Huston (born September 16, 1942), known as "The Voice", is a harness race announcer. He has announced over 184,949 races in his career, covering at least 164 different tracks in 17 states and 8 countries (as of 2026). He was also the Public Address Announcer for The Pitt Panthers in football (and limited basketball) in the 1970s and 1980s, made famous by his enthusiastic call of "tackle by #99 HUGH Green!"

Born and raised in Xenia, Ohio, Huston grew up with a love of sports statistics. He learned race calling from his uncle, who called races at Lebanon Raceway. He attended Wilmington College, intending to become a teacher. He began announcing races at Ohio county fairs in 1960. In 1965, he began announcing at The Red Mile. In 1967, he began announcing at Little Brown Jug, becoming the track's regular announcer in 1968, a position he held until 2024. In 1976, he began announcing at The Meadows, where he also hosts The Meadows Racing Network. He announced at The Meadows until he retired in 2019.

He has also called unusual races for charity and civic causes, including crawling baby races and pig races at state fairs.

The United States Harness Writers Association has elected Huston to their Communicator's Hall of Fame (2000) and awarded him their Proximity Award (2011). The Keystone Chapter of the USHWA inducted Huston into their Hall of Fame (2013). He was elected to the Little Brown Jug Wall of Fame in 2000.

Huston has been married twice, and has one daughter by each marriage. Each daughter was named after a horse, Cami Sue and Nevele Pride.
