= Hubdub =

Defunct prediction market

- Website type: Prediction market
- Owner: Hubdub Ltd
- Website: http://www.hubdub.com
- Registration: Free
- Launched: January 28, 2008
- Current status: Closed

Hubdub was a web-based prediction market in which players used virtual money to trade predictions on future events. Over time users built up a portfolio of live predictions across their chosen categories of interest such as politics, sport, entertainment, technology or other categories. Each player's performance was tracked allowing them to compete on leader boards which demonstrate their knowledge and expertise in their chosen category.

== Background ==
Hubdub launched at the DEMO 08 technology conference on January, 28th 2008. Politics and sports tend to be the most active categories followed by technology and entertainment. Hubdub had a largely U.S. audience base which was evidenced by its mainly U.S. news content.

On January 14, 2009, the company announced that it had taken on board venture capital funding of $1.2m from Pentech Ventures although there was still considerable speculation around what commercial model the company will pursue going forward.

== PunditWatch ==
On June 4, 2008, Hubdub launched PunditWatch which was a feature which tracks major pundits from technology, politics and entertainment. Pundits included TechCrunch, Henry Blodget's Silicon Alley Insider, Pat Buchanan and Perez Hilton. Every time the pundit made a public prediction it was logged using a shadow account on the Hubdub prediction. The performance of each of the pundit's predictions was then tracked over time and the pundit's overall accuracy derived. Commentators such as the Wall Street Journal described the concept of PunditWatch as good but the execution flawed.

== Premium Game ==
On July 21, 2009, the team behind Hubdub.com launched FanDuel a premium fantasy sports game.

== Closure ==
On April 14, 2010, Hubdub announced that it would close the site on April 30, 2010, due to financial reasons. On 30 April 2010, the website was officially closed down.
