= FanDuel =

American bookmaker and daily fantasy sports provider

FanDuel Group
- Type: Subsidiary
- Industry: Online gambling
- Founded: July 21, 2009; 17 years ago
- Founder: Nigel Eccles; Lesley Eccles; Tom Griffiths; Rob Jones; Chris Stafford
- Headquarters: 300 Park Avenue South; New York, NY 10010; U.S.
- Key people: Christian Genetski (CEO); Karol Corcoran (Managing director)
- Number of employees: ~4,000 (2026)
- Parent: Flutter Entertainment (100%)
- Website: www.fanduel.com

FanDuel Group is an Irish gambling company that offers sportsbook, daily fantasy sports, horse racing, and online casino services. The company is headquartered in Manhattan, New York City and operates sportsbooks in a number of states including New Jersey, Pennsylvania, Indiana and West Virginia, as well as an online horse race betting platform, and a daily fantasy sports service.

The company was originally founded as a daily fantasy sports provider, and principally competed with DraftKings. In July 2018, amid the widening legalization of sports betting in the United States, FanDuel merged with the U.S. operations of Irish bookmaker Paddy Power Betfair (now Flutter Entertainment) to form FanDuel Group.

== History ==
FanDuel was founded by Nigel Eccles, Lesley Eccles, Tom Griffiths, Rob Jones and Chris Stafford on July 21, 2009 in Edinburgh, Scotland, as a pivot from Hubdub, a news prediction site, after taking in $1.2 million in venture capital funding from Pentech Ventures and Scottish Enterprise. In 2010, FanDuel held its first "FanDuel Fantasy Football Championship (FFFC)." The event consisted of ten users who won entry into the event by winning a qualifying league throughout the NFL season. First place was awarded $25,000 and the total prize pool was $40,000.

On January 30, 2013, FanDuel announced that it had closed an $11 million Series C funding round. In September 2014, the company announced $70 million in Series D funding. In July 2015, FanDuel announced a Series E funding round of $275 million leading the company to be valued at over a billion dollars.

In May 2015, FanDuel hired 38 of 42 employees that were laid off by Zynga 365 sports. Shortly after announcing the Series E fundraise, FanDuel acquired sports analytics company numberFire. Then in July 2015 FanDuel made its second acquisition in app developer Kotikan. Kotikan developed FanDuel's mobile app, and it was decided that they would be brought in house to help further develop mobile offerings. In September 2015, FanDuel acquired the esports focused DFS service AlphaDraft.

In October 2015, The New York Times reported that an employee of DraftKings inadvertently released data before the start of the third week of NFL games and won $350,000 on the FanDuel website. DraftKings stated that the employees could not have used their information to make decisions about FanDuel lineups. FanDuel and DraftKings have since prohibited employees from playing in contests for money on rival websites. At the time of the incident the company released a statement that DraftKings' employees had won up to 0.3% of the $2 billion of prize money that FanDuel has given out. In a separate analysis it was shown that 91% of the player profits at DraftKings and FanDuel were won by just 1.3% of players on the website.

On November 18, 2016, DraftKings and FanDuel announced an intent to merge. The combined company would serve over five million users. On June 19, 2017, the Federal Trade Commission (FTC) announced that it would seek a preliminary injunction to block the then proposed merger. The FTC stated that the proposed transaction would give the combined company 90% of the DFS market, which it considered to be a monopoly position. The merger was subsequently terminated.

In September 2017, FanDuel and DraftKings each paid $1.3 million to settle with the Massachusetts Attorney General's office over allegations of unfair and deceptive practices by the companies prior to 2016. In November 2017, Nigel Eccles left the company. He was replaced as CEO by Matt King, who was previously CFO. Co-founder Tom Griffiths left the company shortly thereafter, replaced by Nik Bonaddio, formerly of NumberFire, as Head of Product.

=== Acquisition and expansion ===
In May 2018, Ireland-based bookmaker Paddy Power Betfair (now Flutter Entertainment) announced its intent to acquire FanDuel. Paddy Power Betfair planned to contribute $158 million and merge its existing assets in the United States (which also include the horse racing oriented cable networks TVG Network and TVG2) into FanDuel; Paddy Power Betfair holds a 61% controlling stake, with the option to increase its stake to 80% and 100% over time.

The merger came in the wake of a 2018 Supreme Court ruling that repealed the Professional and Amateur Sports Protection Act of 1992, which had effectively outlawed sports betting in almost all states in the United States. FanDuel had been preparing to offer a sports wagering platform, while Paddy Power Betfair stated that the merger would make it "exceptionally well placed to target the prospective sport betting opportunity." FanDuel would become Paddy Power Betfair's main brand in the United States.

The acquisition was completed on July 11, 2018, with FanDuel and Paddy Power Betfair's US operations merged to form FanDuel Group. The FanDuel board valued FanDuel's stake in the merger at $465 million, which was significantly lower than FanDuel's internal valuation. This resulted in a $120 million lawsuit in Scottish court by the company founders including Lesley Eccles, the former head of marketing for FanDuel. On February 25, 2020, over 100 former employees, company founders, and early investors filed suit in New York against FanDuel's board for breach of fiduciary duty in allegedly undervaluing FanDuel to enrich themselves.

A few days after the merger was completed, FanDuel opened its first branded sportsbook at the Meadowlands Racetrack in New Jersey. In March 2019, a FanDuel sportsbook opened at Valley Forge Casino Resort in Pennsylvania. FanDuel also offers online sports betting in Indiana, New Jersey, Illinois, Pennsylvania, West Virginia, and New York.

In August 2018, FanDuel announced that it had partnered with Minute Media to create The Duel, a new site for fantasy/sports betting information generated by fans.

In February 2020, FanDuel reached an agreement with Scientific Games to serve as the technology partner for its current and future sports betting operations.

In December 2020, Flutter Entertainment announced that it had increased its stake in FanDuel Group to 95% in a $4.1 billion cash-and-stock deal. In May 2021, FanDuel announced that CEO Matt King would be stepping down after four years with the company. In 2021, the company began to launch the online casino FanDuel Casino in selected states.

In August 2022, FanDuel announced the re-launch of TVG Network—a co-owned horse racing cable network—as FanDuel TV. The channel would continue to primarily carry live coverage of horse racing events, but would expand its coverage of mainstream sports from a gambling perspective. On October 16, 2024, Diamond Sports Group revealed in a bankruptcy court filing that it had reached an agreement with FanDuel Group to rebrand its the Bally Sports regional sports networks as FanDuel Sports Network. The agreement contains an option for FanDuel to take a 5% equity stake in Diamond upon its exit from chapter 11 bankruptcy protection; Diamond subsequently became known as Main Street Sports Group.

In November 2025, FanDuel announced the launch of a prediction market product, which will allow it to open up in states where traditional sports betting is illegal and deal with competitive pressure from new startup exchanges.

== Partnerships ==
In November 2018, FanDuel announced a multi-year agreement to become a sports betting partner, and official daily fantasy sports partner, of the National Hockey League. The company announced a separate team sponsorship with the NHL's New Jersey Devils the same day, which includes in-arena sponsorship for FanDuel Sportsbook, and brand integration via team platforms. FanDuel also partnered with The Volume in 2022.

In 2020, FanDuel entered into a multi-year agreement to become the official sports betting partner of the PGA Tour; the partnership included the promotion of FanDuel odds on PGA Tour digital properties and social media outlets. The agreement was later renewed through 2027, adding sponsorship placements during tournament telecasts as the official odds provider of the PGA Tour. In 2023, FanDuel also partnered with the PGA Tour on a market access agreement to offer its sportsbook in North Carolina.

== Awards and recognition ==
=== 2016 ===
- Webby Awards: Judges Selection: Best Sports App (Handheld Device)

=== 2015 ===
- Webby Awards: Judges Selection: Best Sports App (Handheld Device)
- Webby Awards: People's Choice Award: Best Mobile Sports App

== Operations ==
As of January 2026, FanDuel operated an online sportsbook in 23 U.S. states and also in Ontario and Puerto Rico; it operated retail sportsbooks in 15 U.S. states and offered online casino products in Connecticut, Michigan, New Jersey, Pennsylvania, West Virginia, Ontario, and Puerto Rico. Its daily fantasy sports contests were available in more than 40 U.S. states, subject to state-specific regulations.

== Financial performance ==
Flutter Entertainment (FanDuel's parent company) reported that its U.S. segment—comprising the FanDuel brand-generated $5,798 million in revenue for the year ended December 31, 2024, consisting of sportsbook, iGaming and other revenue streams.

Flutter U.S. segment revenue (FanDuel brand), 2024
Revenue stream	Revenue (US$ millions)
Sportsbook	4,013
iGaming	1,524
Other	261
Total U.S. segment revenue	5,798
