= NumberFire =

American sporting data company

numberFire
- Company type: Private
- Founded: 2010
- Founder: Nik Bonaddio
- Headquarters: New York, NY, USA
- Key people: Keith Goldner; Michael Worthington; Adam Kaplan
- Website: numberfire.com

numberFire is a privately held company that offers statistical analysis of data around sporting events and sports fans, targeting fantasy sports players, digital media, writers, teams, and leagues. The site boasts over 700,000 subscribers and partnerships with ESPN, NFL, Sports Illustrated, USA Today, and SB Nation.

== History ==
The company was founded in 2010 by Nik Bonaddio, who launched the initial version of the product following a successful appearance on Who Wants To Be A Millionaire; the winnings from that show were used to found the company. Later that year, Bonaddio successfully pitched the company at the DisruptNYC conference held by TechCrunch in New York City, gaining an initial PR buzz and investor interest.

The team quickly expanded in February 2011 with the hiring of Keith Goldner as chief analyst. Goldner has worked in the sports analytics industry with the Oklahoma City Thunder, Philadelphia 76ers, and ESPN among others.

In late 2011, the company announced venture capital financing from RRE Ventures, New York University, and several other investors.

numberFire was acquired by FanDuel in August 2015. Terms of the deal were not disclosed.

== Methodology ==
Unlike traditional media analysis, the company aims to use statistical modeling and data mining to help consumers and businesses make smarter decisions in the fantasy sports, handicapping, and digital media markets. This is done through the generation of specific, proprietary formulas that analyze statistics in an unconventional, scientific manner. The company has received notable press coverage for correctly picking the winner of Super Bowl XLV and successfully outpredicting ESPN, Yahoo!, and CBS in the fantasy markets.
