= List of casinos in Oregon =

This is a list of casinos in Oregon.

== List of casinos ==
This is a list of existing and proposed casinos in the U.S. state of Oregon
Casino	City	County	State	District	Type	Comments
Chinook Winds Casino	Lincoln City	Lincoln	Oregon	Oregon Coast	Native American	Confederated Tribes of the Siletz
Columbia Gorge casino (proposed)	Cascade Locks	Hood River	Oregon	Columbia River Gorge	Native American	Confederated Tribes of Warm Springs
Indian Head Casino	Warm Springs	Jefferson	Oregon	Central Oregon	Native American	Confederated Tribes of Warm Springs
Kah-Nee-Ta High Desert Resort and Casino	Warm Springs	Jefferson	Oregon	Central Oregon	Native American	Confederated Tribes of Warm Springs (closed)
Kla-Mo-Ya Casino	Chiloquin	Klamath	Oregon	Southern Oregon	Native American	Klamath Tribes
Ko-Kwel Casino Resort Coos Bay	North Bend	Coos	Oregon	Oregon Coast	Native American	Coquille Indian Tribe. Formerly The Mill Casino.
Ko-Kwel Casino Medford	Medford	Jackson	Oregon	Southern Oregon	Native American	Coquille Indian Tribe (Class II)
Old Camp Casino	Burns	Harney	Oregon	Eastern Oregon	Native American	Burns Paiute Tribe (closed)
Seven Feathers Hotel & Casino Resort	Canyonville	Douglas	Oregon	Southern Oregon	Native American	Cow Creek Band of Umpqua Tribe of Indians
Spirit Mountain Casino	Grand Ronde	Polk	Oregon	Willamette Valley	Native American	Confederated Tribes of the Grand Ronde Community of Oregon
Three Rivers Casino	Florence	Lane	Oregon	Oregon Coast	Native American	Confederated Tribes of Coos, Lower Umpqua and Siuslaw Indians
Three Rivers Casino Coos Bay	Coos Bay	Coos	Oregon	Oregon Coast	Native American	Confederated Tribes of Coos, Lower Umpqua and Siuslaw Indians (Class II)
Wildhorse Resort & Casino	Pendleton	Umatilla	Oregon	Eastern Oregon	Native American	Confederated Tribes of the Umatilla Indian Reservation

== Gallery ==
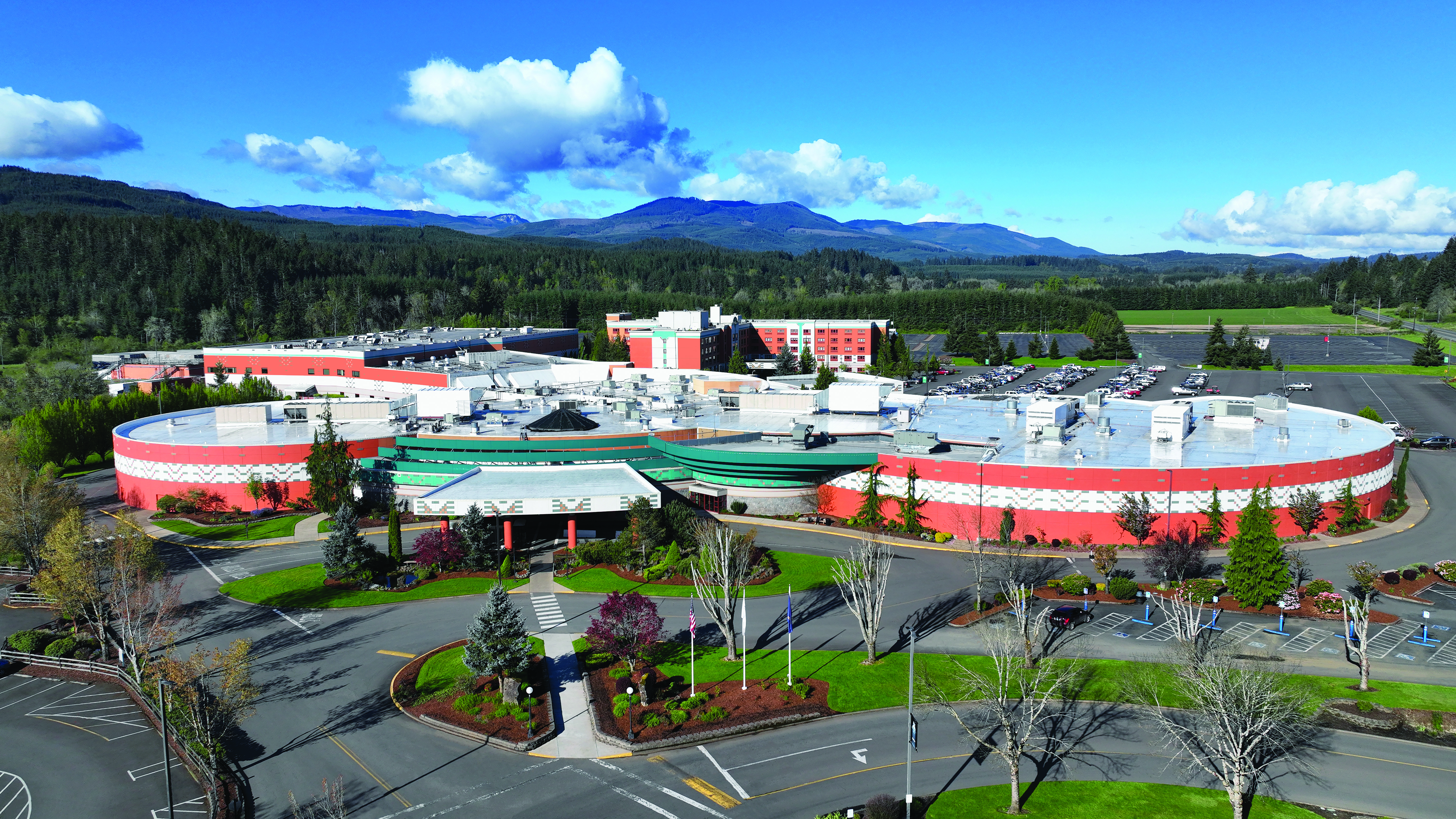
Spirit Mountain

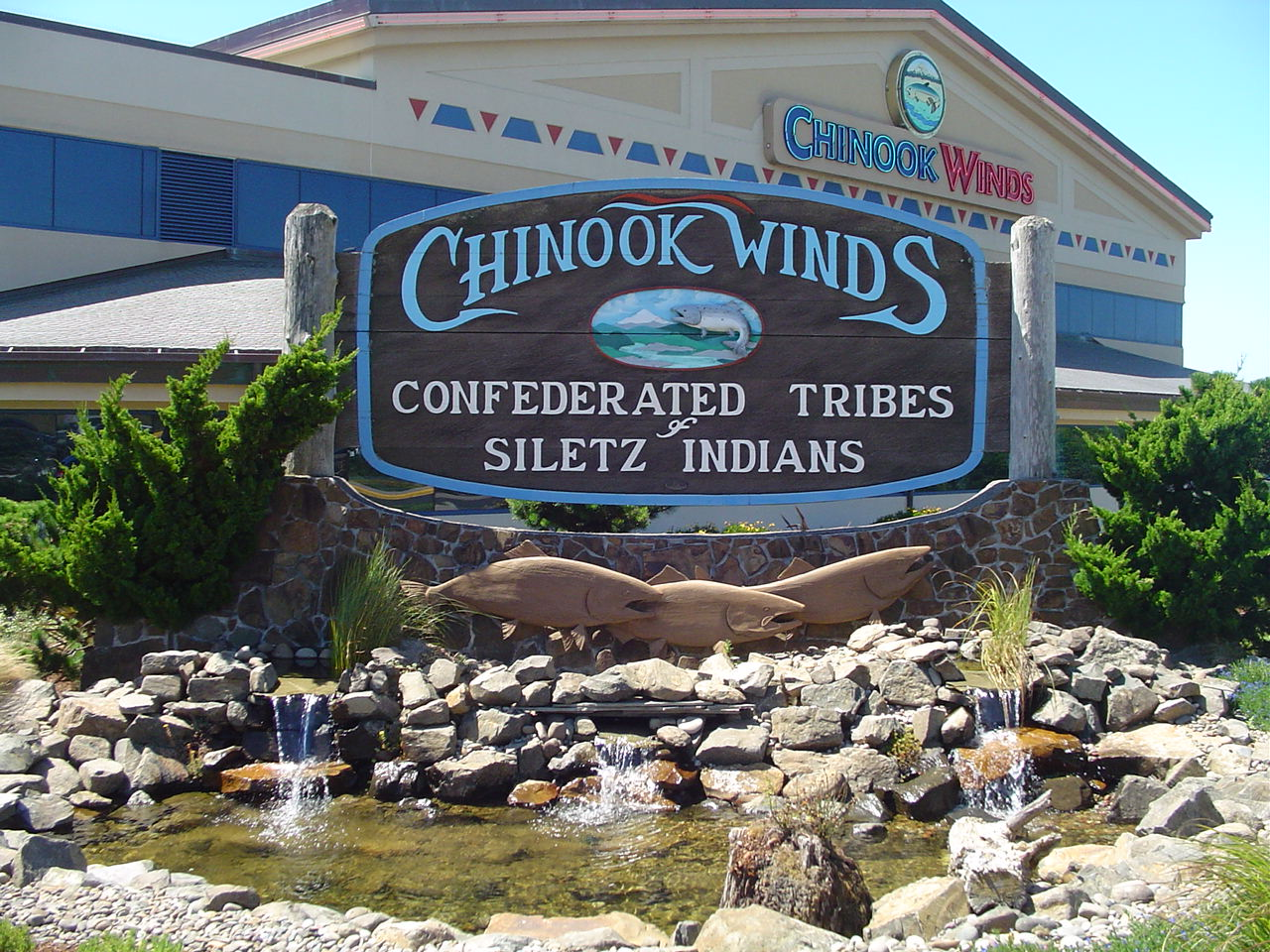
Chinook Winds

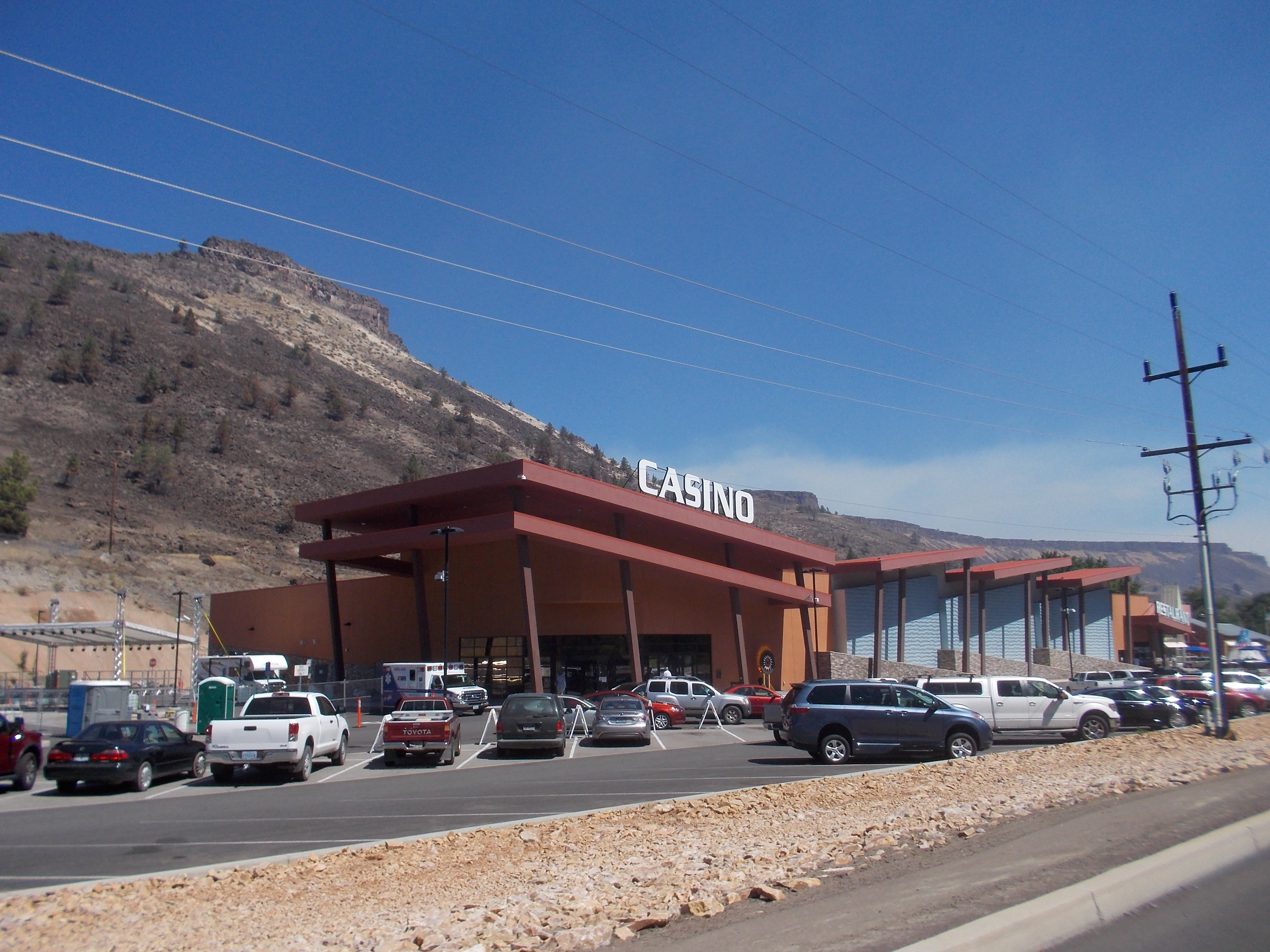
Indian Head

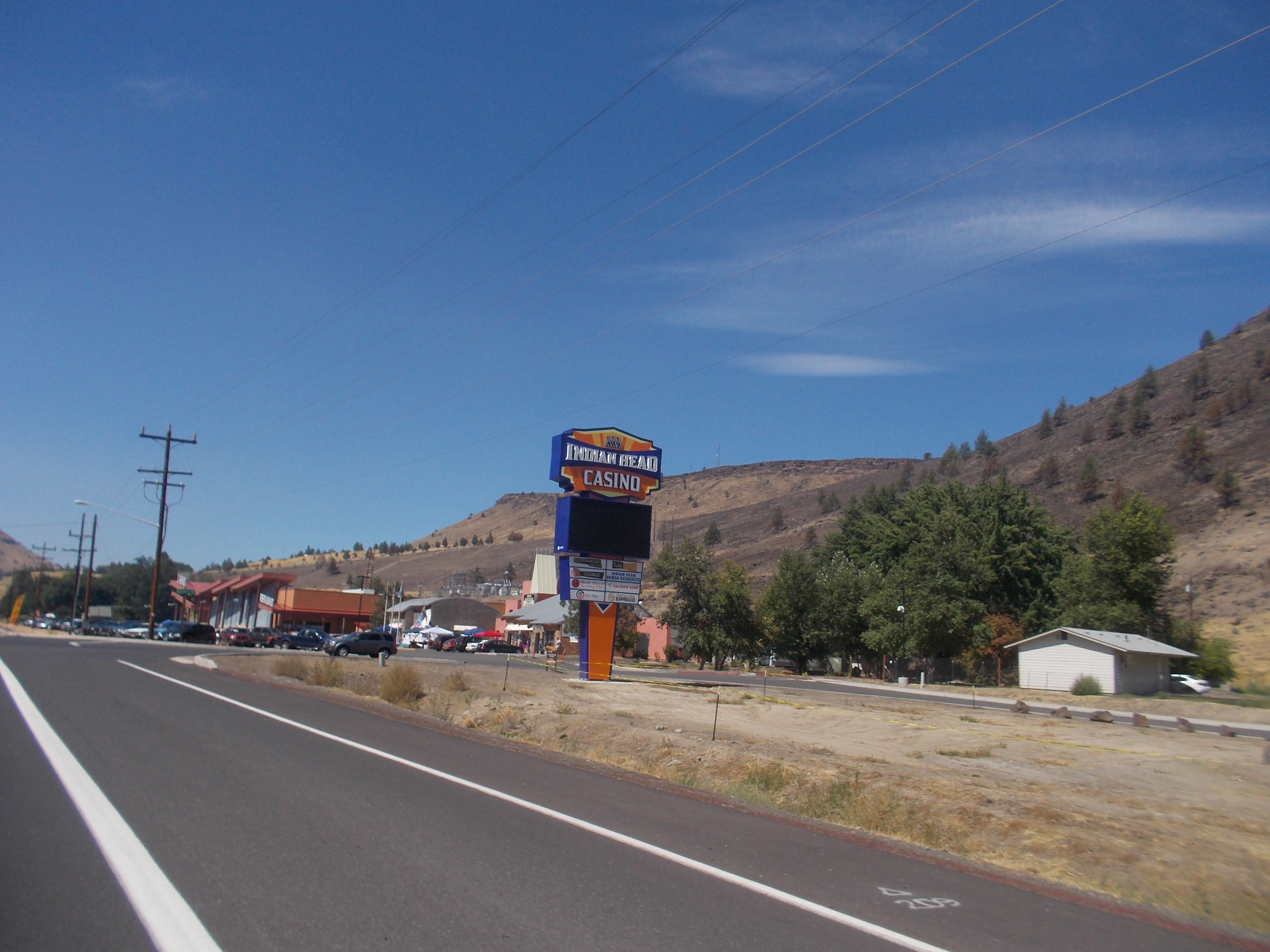
Indian Head (sign)

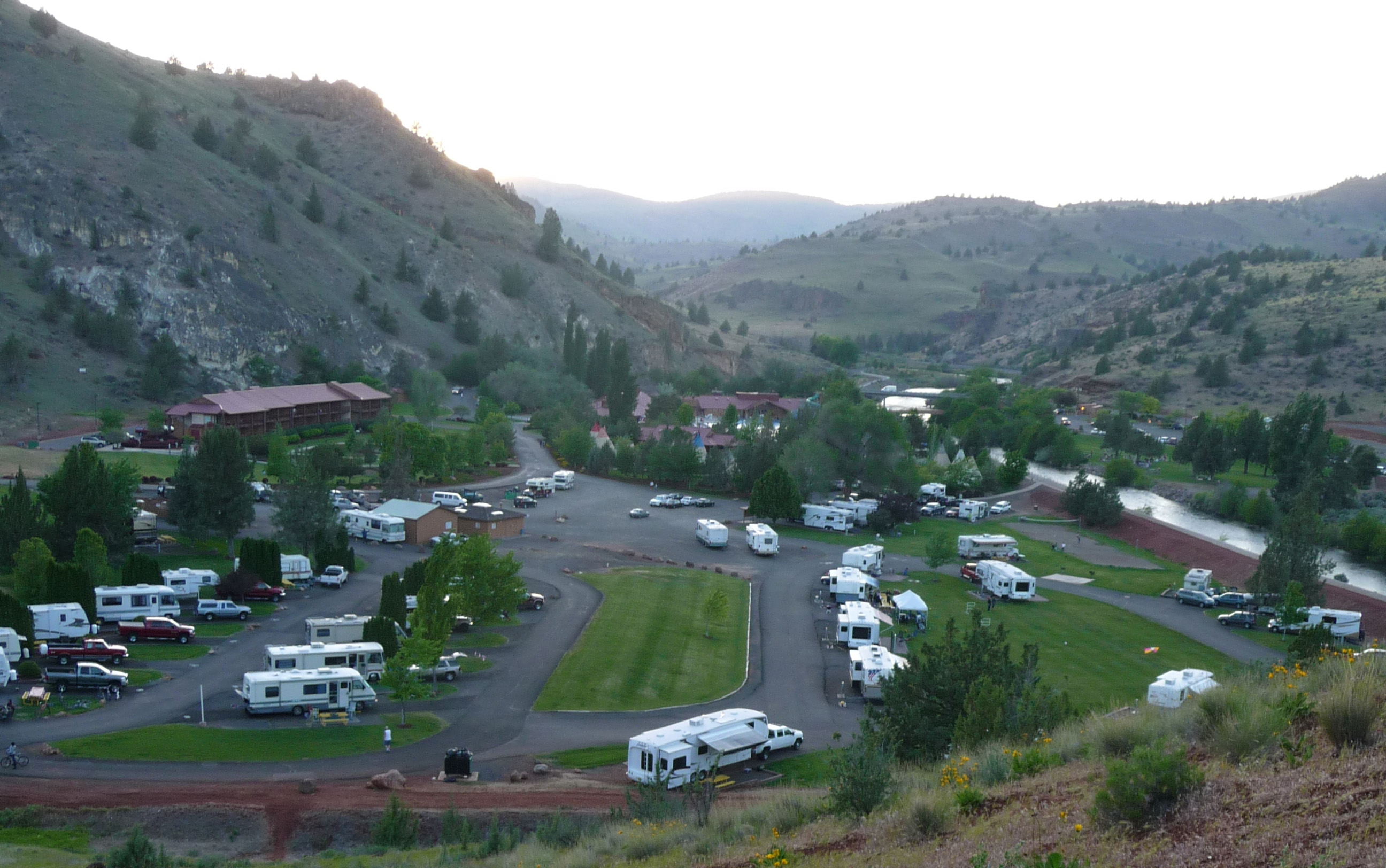
Kah-Nee-Ta

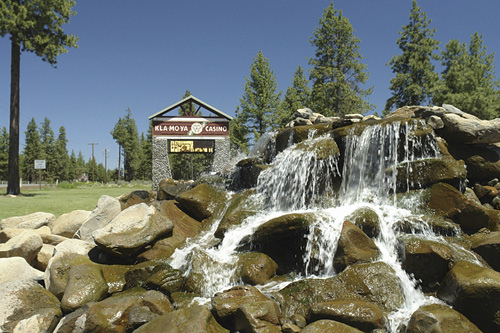
Kla-Mo-Ya

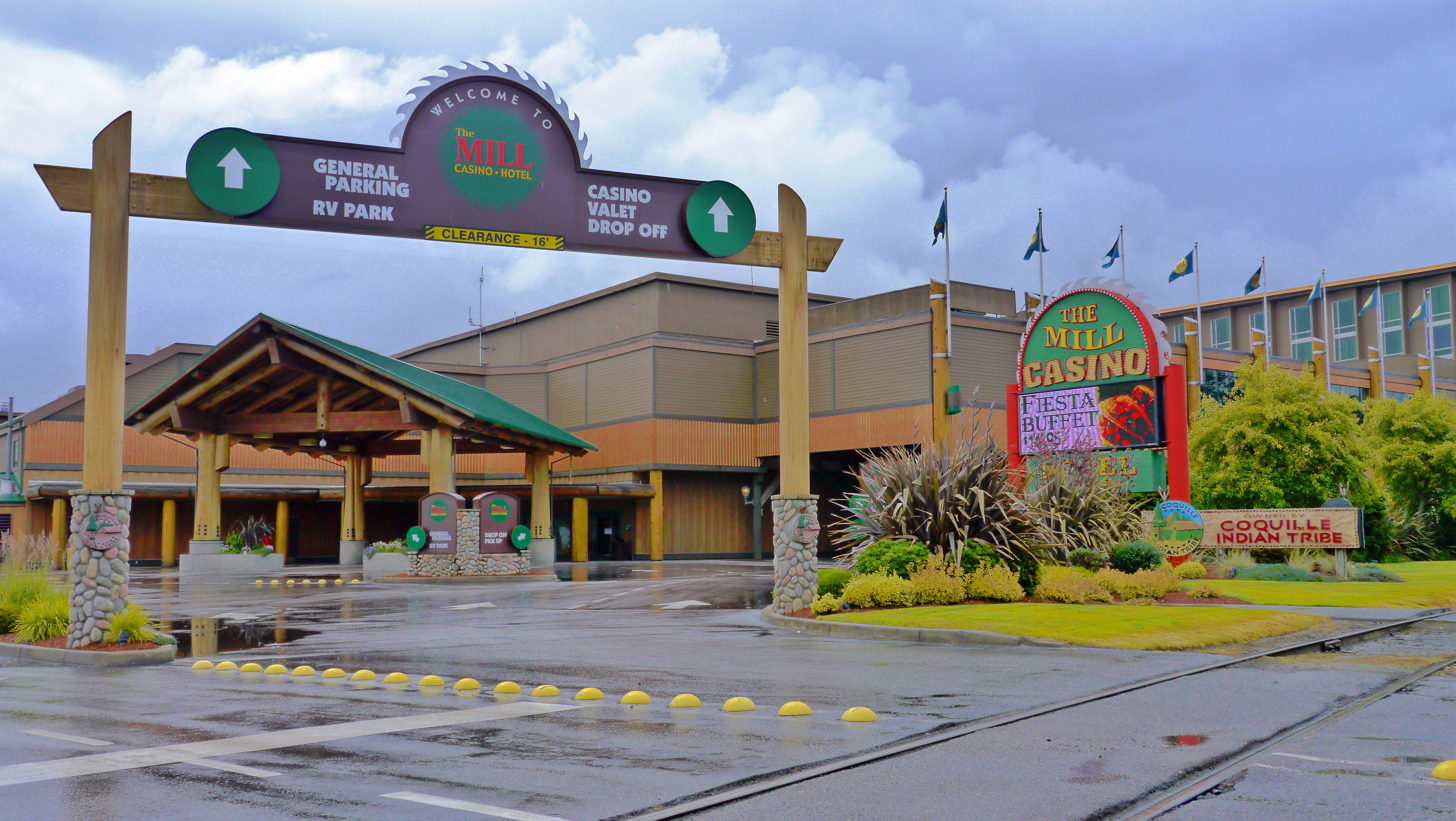
The Mill

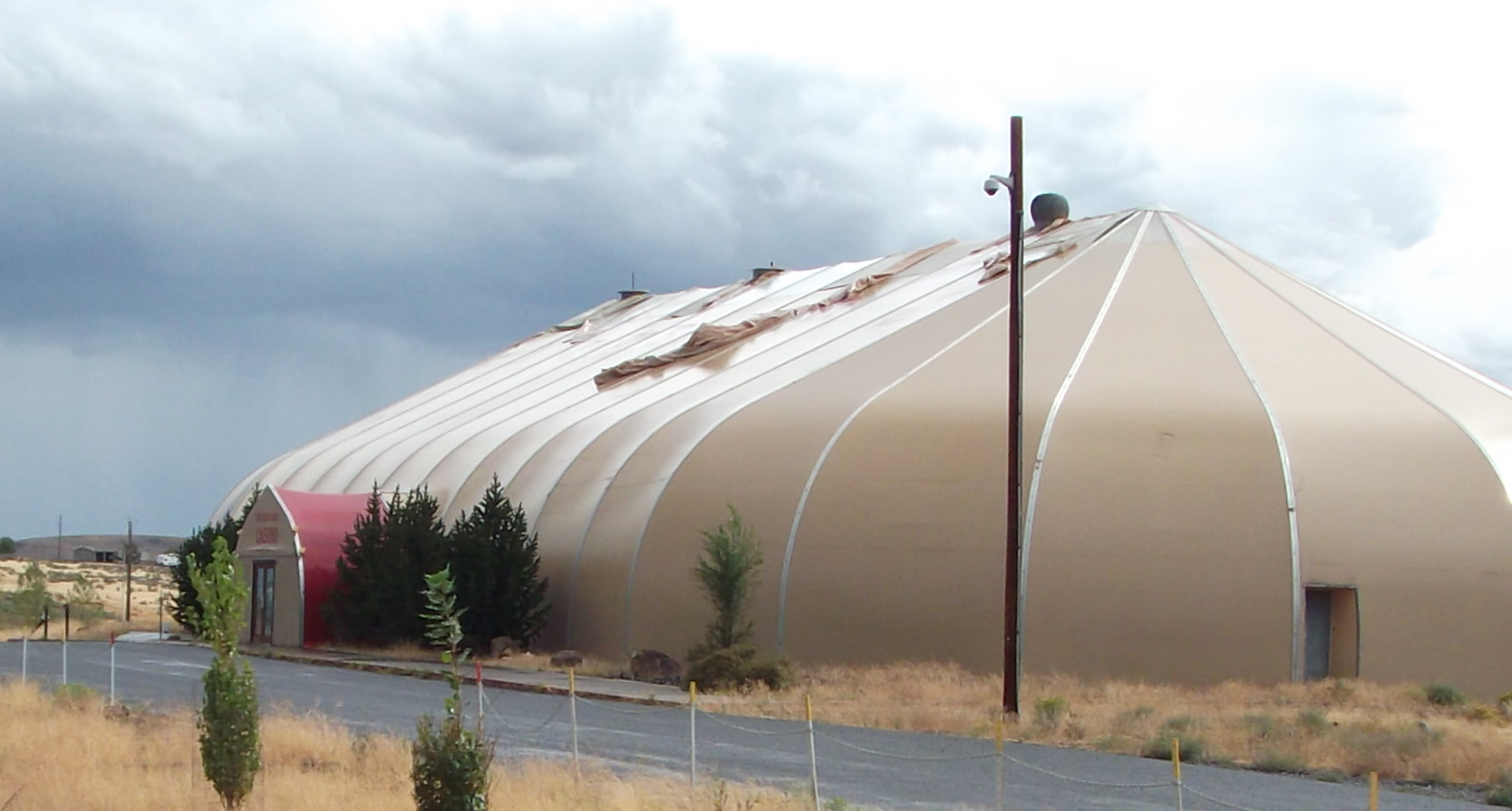
The Old Camp

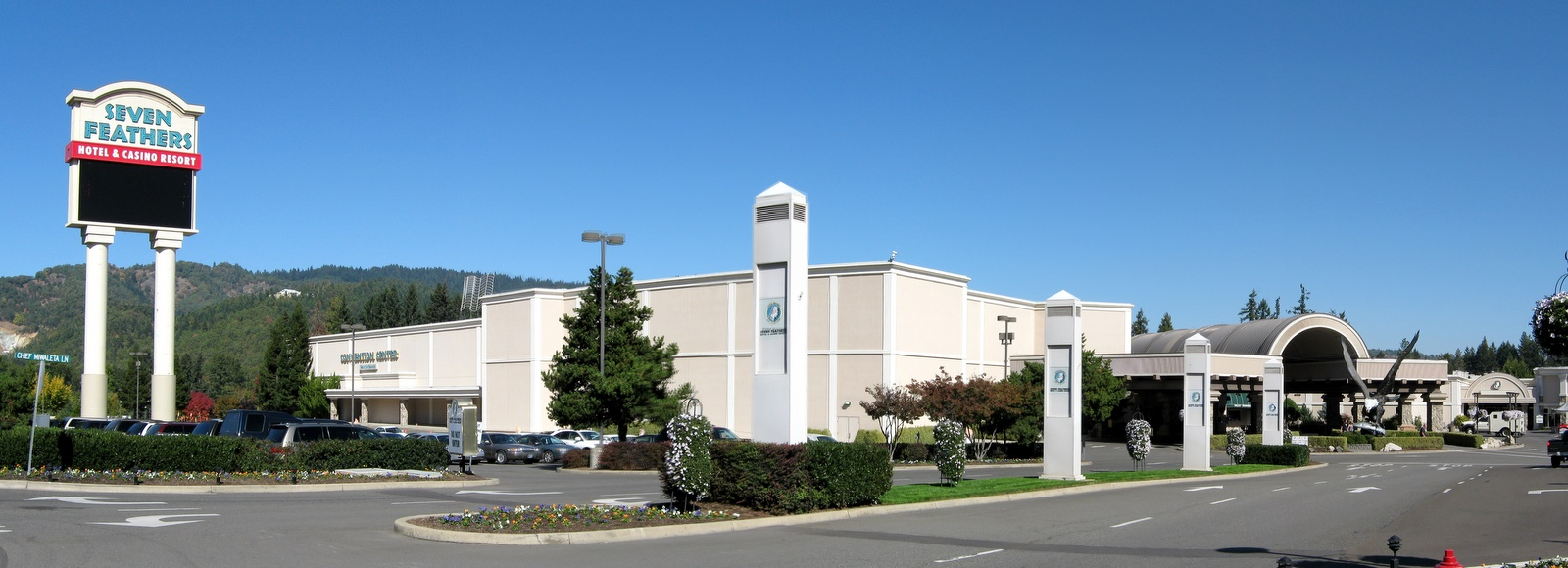
Seven Feathers

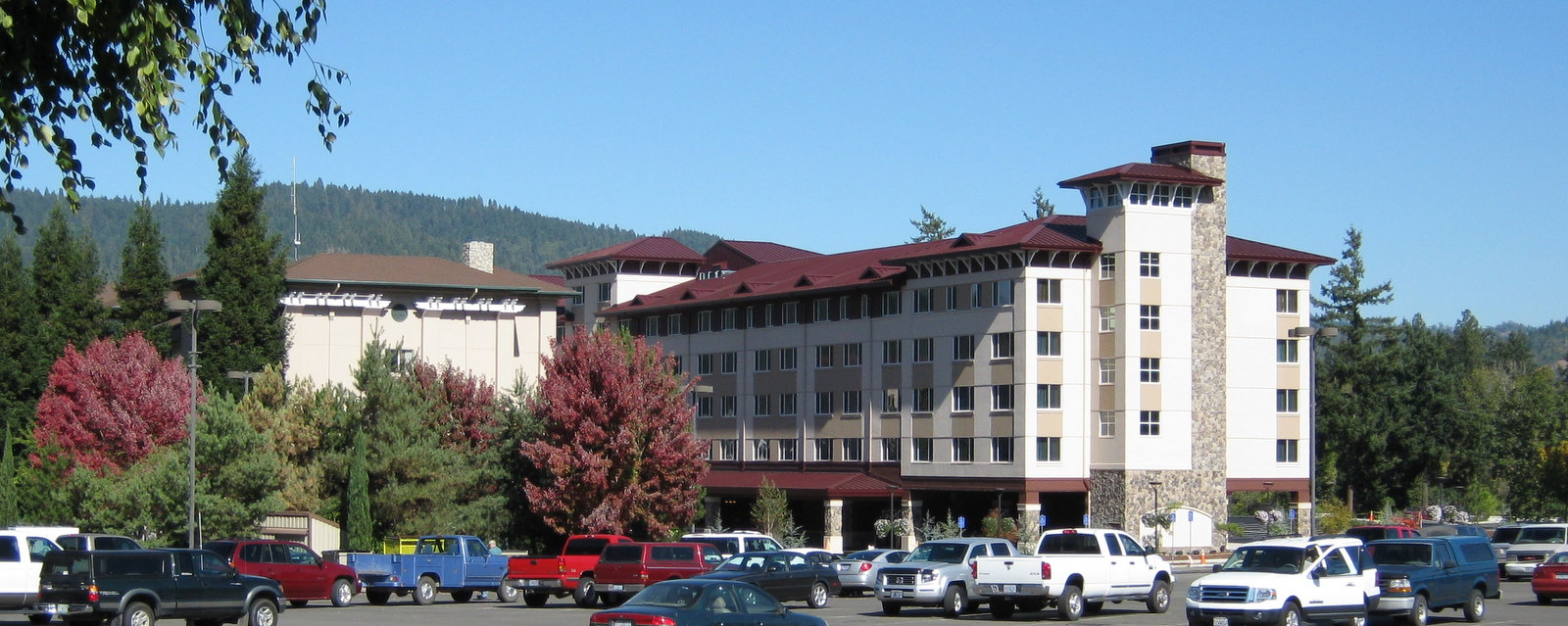
Seven Feathers (hotel)

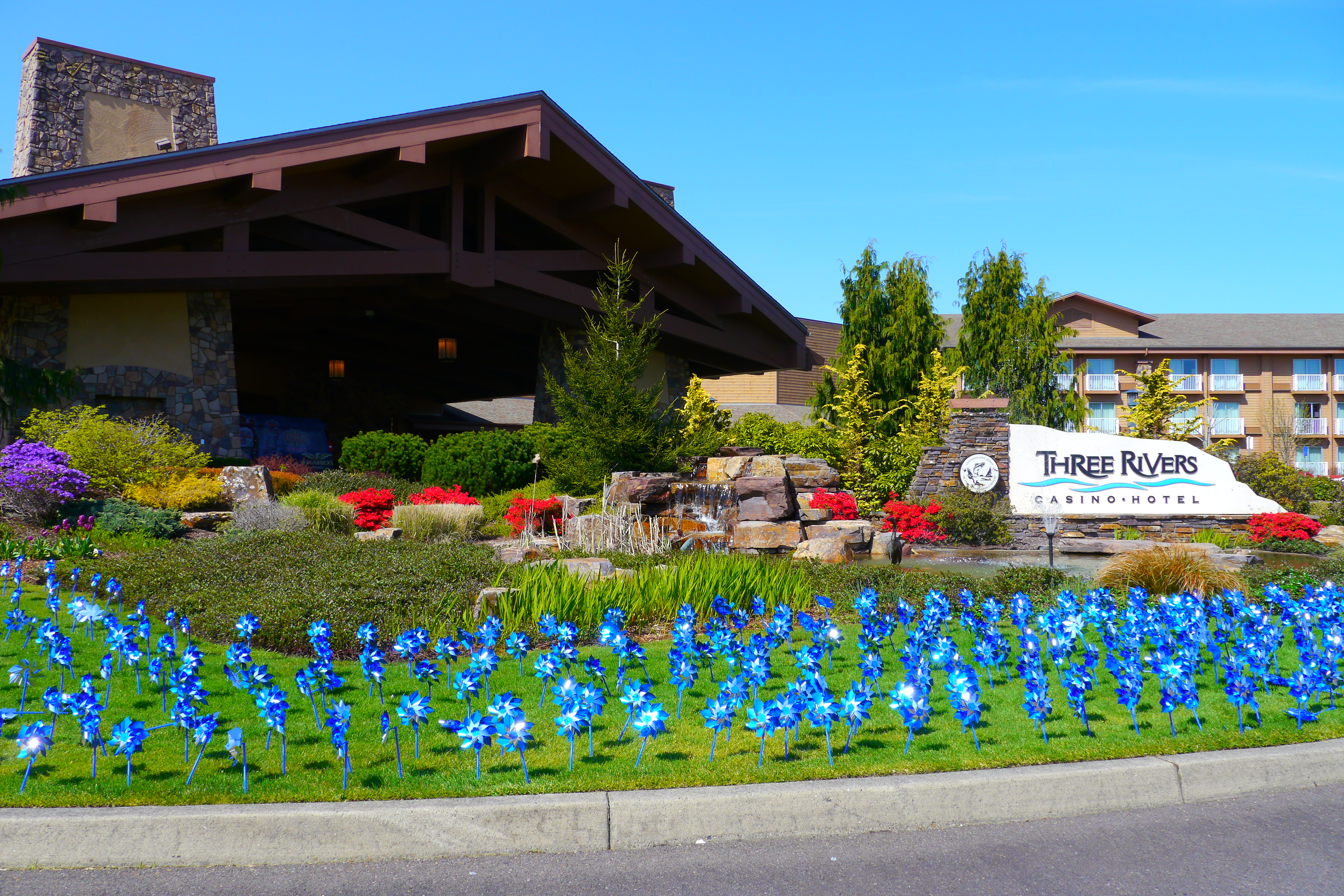
Three Rivers

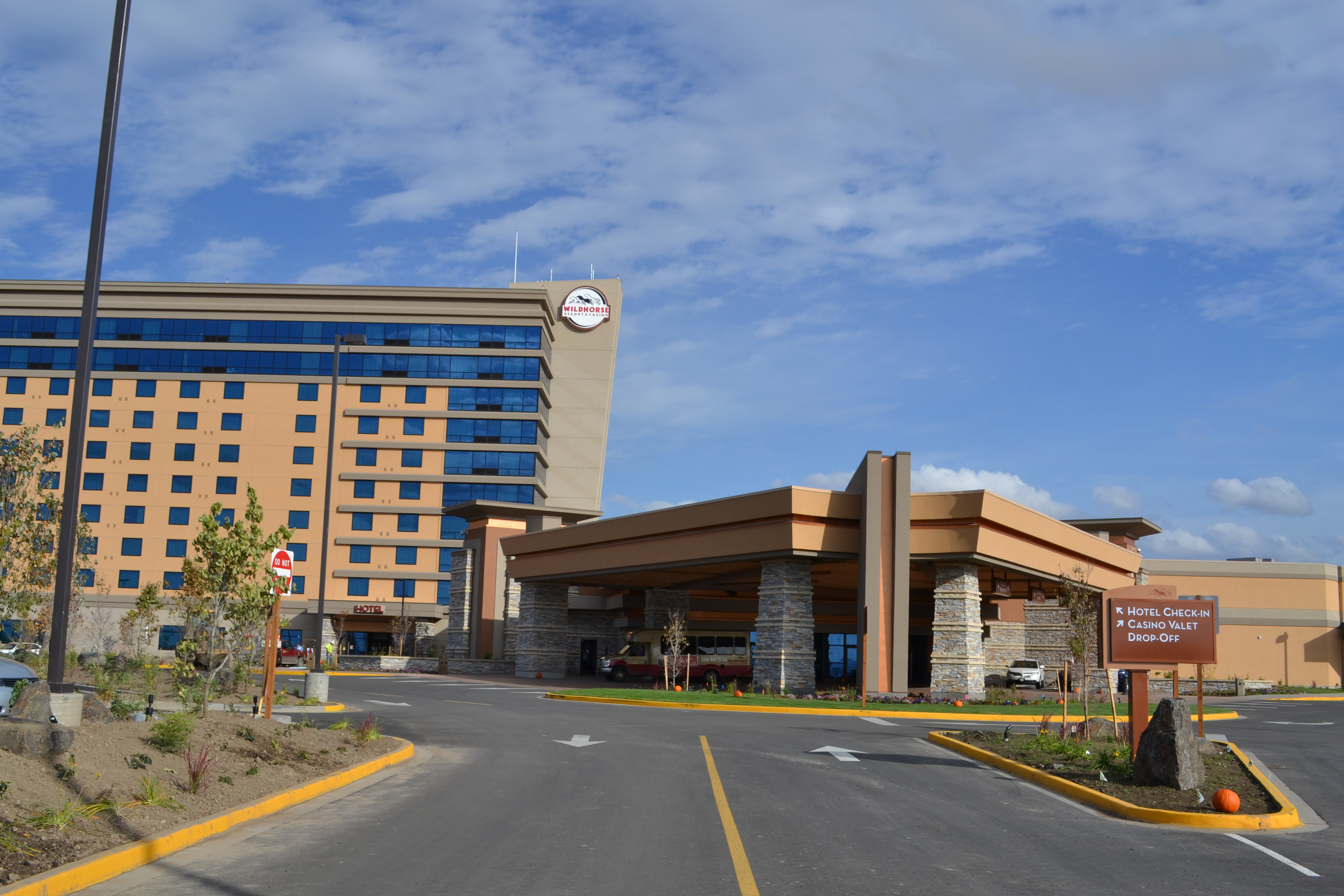
Wildhorse

== See also ==
- Gambling in Oregon
- List of casino hotels
- List of casinos in the United States
- List of federally recognized Native American tribes in Oregon
- Lists of Oregon-related topics
