= Gambling in Oregon =

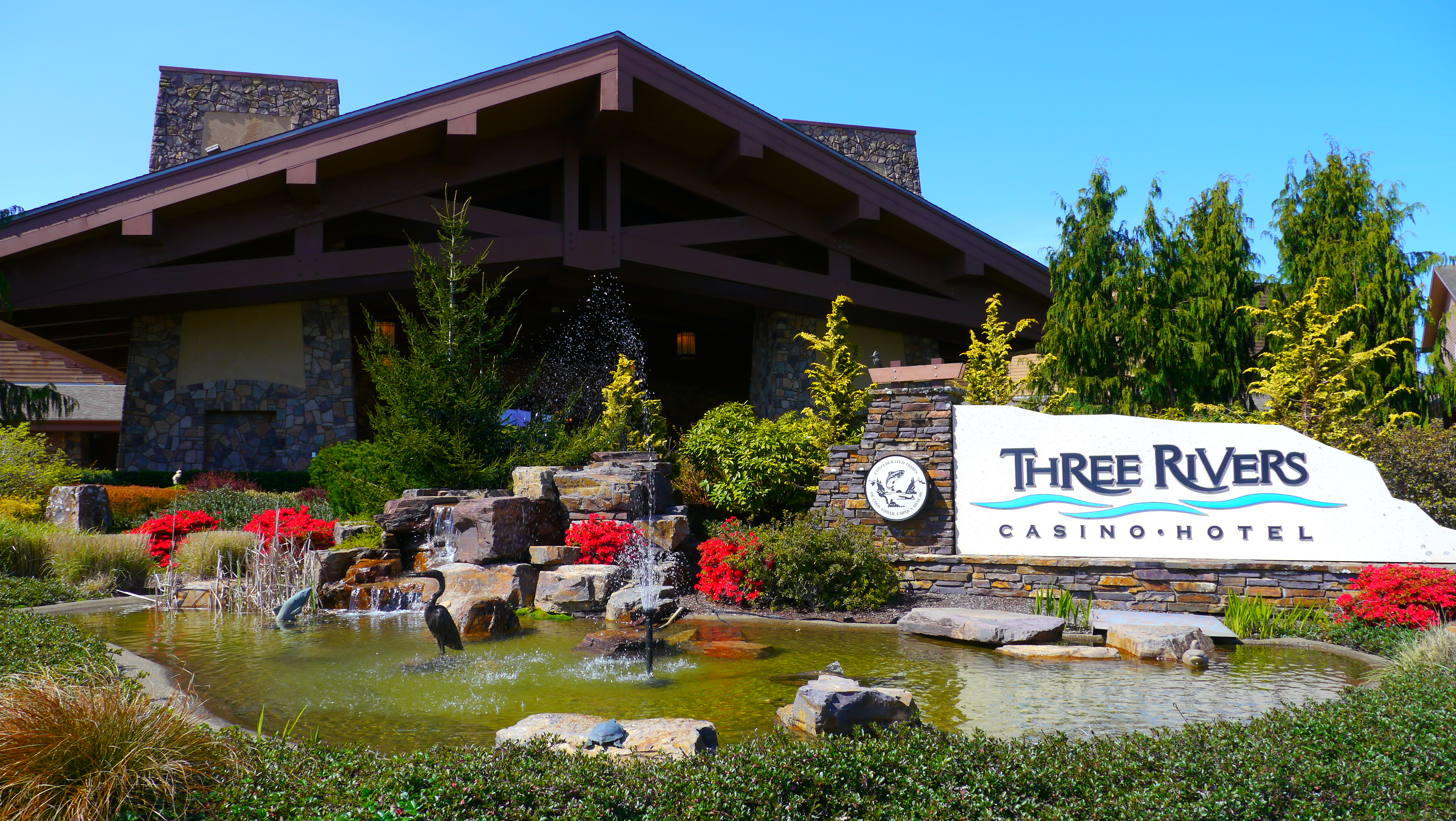
The Three Rivers Casino in Florence, Oregon

Gambling in Oregon relates to the laws, regulations, and authorized forms of gambling.

== Authorized forms ==
=== Race tracks ===
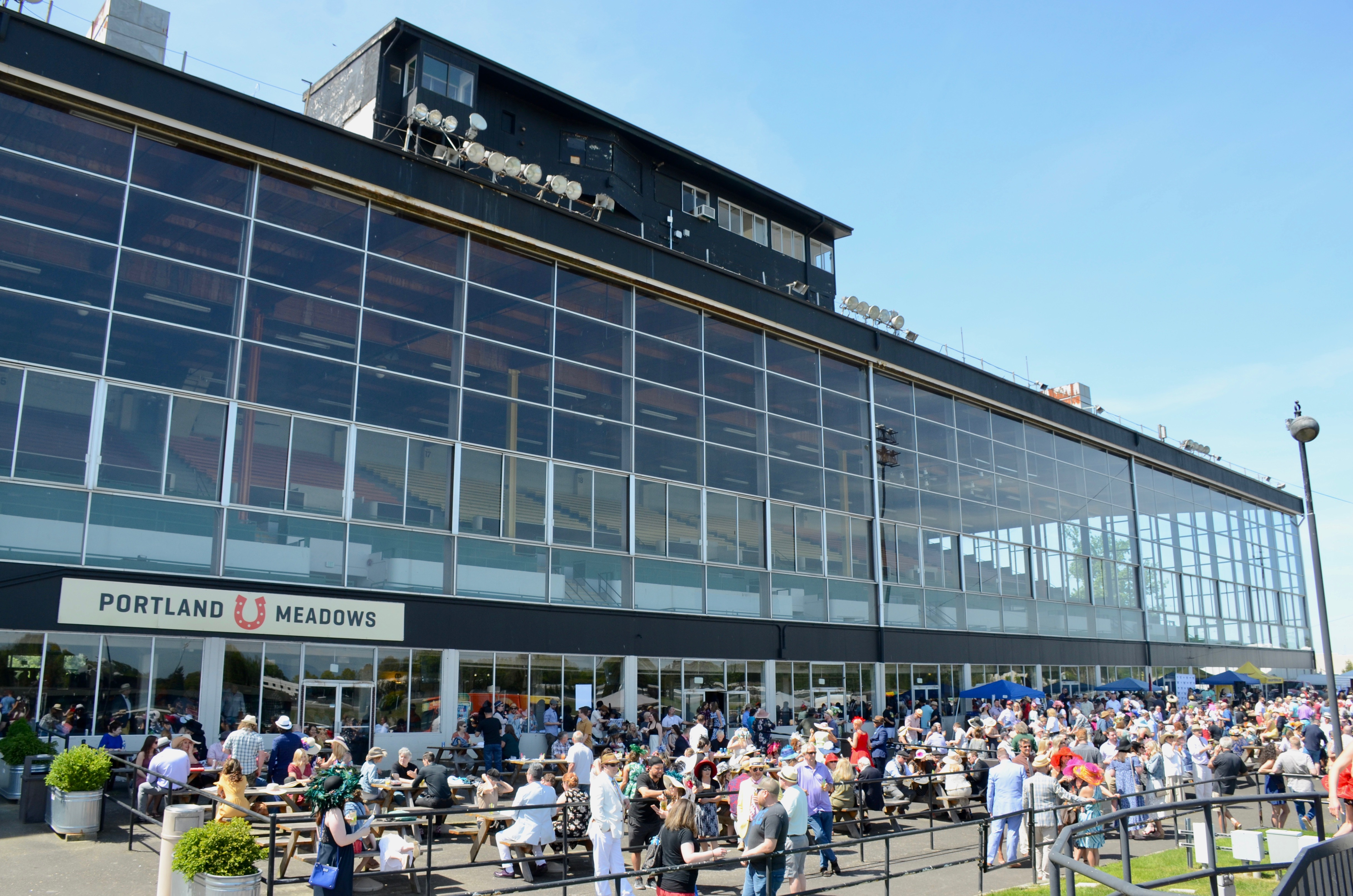
Portland Meadows

Portland Meadows, opened in 1946, formerly offered a full season of Quarter Horse and Thoroughbred racing. Off-track betting, operated under the Portland Meadows license, was available at 11 sites throughout the state. The track's closure was announced in March 2019, following the conclusion of the 2018-19 racing season, with the property slated for redevelopment. The last day for simulcast racing was December 7, 2019 and the poker room closed December 15, 2019. Demolition began in February 2020. Grants Pass Downs subsequently secured a 3-year commercial racing license for a track in Grants Pass beginning with the 2020-21 racing season, including the rights for off-track betting and to simulcast races held elsewhere.

Horse racing is also held on the "Oregon summer fair circuit", consisting of several weekends at Grants Pass Downs in Grants Pass, plus 3- and 4-day meets in Union, Prineville, Tillamook, and Burns. Races were a part of the Oregon State Fair through the 2000 season, after which they were discontinued due to low revenue and a deteriorating grandstand.

Greyhound racing was held from 1933 to 2004, first at Multnomah Stadium and later at Multnomah Greyhound Park, until the latter was closed due to the sport's declining popularity.

In 1997, Oregon was one of the first states to authorize betting "hubs" that accept wagers electronically from out-of-state bettors on horse and dog races nationwide. As of 2011, there were 10 hubs operating in the state, including TVG and Churchill Downs's twinspires.

=== Charitable gaming ===
In 1971, the state legalized "casino nights" with blackjack, roulette, and craps, when organized by a nonprofit organization for fundraising, and played for non-cash prizes. The act was dubbed the "Happy Canyon" law, in reference to a fundraiser traditionally held at the Pendleton Round-Up. A constitutional amendment passed by voters in 1976 allowed bingo and raffles. Texas Hold 'Em was authorized for charitable fundraisers in 2005.

=== Social gaming ===
Cities and counties may choose to allow social gaming to be conducted in businesses and private clubs, where the house does not take a cut or profit from the game.

The state first authorized social gaming in 1973. By 1995, 44 localities had passed ordinances enabling social gaming, and some coastal towns were attracting thriving weekend crowds to their blackjack tables. An investigation by the Lottery Commission that year found that regulations were laxly enforced, with many dealers being paid for their services.

Portland passed a social gaming ordinance in 1984, but it was not until around 2007 that licensed poker clubs began sprouting up around the city. The clubs make money by charging a cover fee, and selling food and drinks. Underground poker clubs have thrived as well, due to their higher profitability.

=== Lottery ===
The Oregon Lottery was enabled by an amendment to the Oregon Constitution approved by 66% of voters in the 1984 general election. A statutory measure passed in the same election, and by about the same margin, providing for a state lottery. Prior to the measures, Oregonians were believed to be spending "a bundle" on the state lottery of neighboring Washington. The lottery commenced operations the following year, initially offering two types of games: scratchcard tickets and a jackpot game called Megabucks.

In 1989, the lottery added Sports Action, in which players bet on NFL football games. Players would choose between 4 and 14 games in a given week, and had to pick the correct team, based on a point spread, in every game. Congress later banned sports betting under the Professional and Amateur Sports Protection Act of 1992, but a grandfather clause allowed Oregon to continue the game. The state legislature ended Sports Action after the 2006-07 NFL season, as a condition of being allowed to host games in the NCAA Men's Division I Basketball Championship.

An illegal industry of video poker arose in bars and restaurants, with as many as 6,000 machines taking annual wagers of $100 million by 1989. Use of the machines for amusement purposes was legal, but illegal payouts by operators were common. To capture some of that revenue, the legislature in 1989 authorized video lottery terminals to be installed in bars and taverns, with a maximum of five devices per location. The plan was abandoned, however, due to opposition from county governments, which cited enforcement difficulties with the existing grey-market machines. Only after the state banned private machines in 1991 did the Lottery move forward, turning on the first video poker games in March 1992. Line games, similar to slot machines, were added to the terminals in 2005. By 2011, over 12,000 terminals were deployed, earning $721 million in revenue (after prizes were subtracted).

=== Indian gaming ===
In the 1980s, the Seminole and Cabazon decisions affirmed the rights of Native American tribes to run gambling operations. The 1988 federal Indian Gaming Regulatory Act codified the right of tribes to offer Class III gaming (casino games, lotteries) within the state, if the state permitted such type of gaming. Between Oregon's lottery and charitable and social gaming laws, this meant that the state's nine federally recognized tribes could potentially run almost any kind of game. The tribes were reluctant, though, citing fears of battles with state officials, cultural opposition to gambling, and for some tribes, remoteness from population centers. By 1991, the only tribal gaming consisted of bingo halls run by the Coquille and Siletz tribes.

The Cow Creek band was the first tribe to successfully negotiate a compact with the state to allow casino-style gaming, adding video poker and blackjack to its bingo hall in 1993. Another early proposal was made by the Siletz tribes, but their plan for a casino in the Salem area was killed by opposition from Governor Barbara Roberts. By 1996, all nine tribes had compacts completed or in negotiations, and six tribal casinos were open. In 2009, Oregon's nine casinos reported total net revenue of $574 million.

Tribes have made several proposals to build off-reservation casinos in or near the lucrative Portland market, to no effect. The Warm Springs tribes, since 1999, have proposed a casino to be built in Cascade Locks in the Columbia River Gorge. The Grand Ronde offered in 2003 to build a stadium to help the city attract a Major League Baseball team, in exchange for the right to open a casino in the area. Later, they offered to build an 800-room hotel, with a casino, at the Oregon Convention Center. Both plans were rejected by Governor Ted Kulongoski. In 2005, the Grand Ronde considered buying Portland Meadows and converting it into a racino. The Klamath Tribes applied in 2006 to build a casino on the French Prairie, but later withdrew the proposal.

== Commercial casino proposals ==
In 1972, John Haviland, owner of the Paramount Theatre in Portland, proposed converting it into a state-operated casino.

In 1978, a group proposed legalizing casinos on the Oregon Coast, which it said would stimulate jobs in the economically depressed area, while providing money for schools statewide.

The 1984 ballot initiative that authorized the lottery inserted the following language into the Oregon Constitution: "The Legislative Assembly has no power to authorize and shall prohibit casinos from operation." This has provided a foundation for some debate as to what, precisely, constitutes a "casino."

A measure passed in the 1995 legislature would have allowed Portland racetracks to install up to 75 video poker machines each; then-Attorney General Ted Kulongoski ruled that the law violated the constitutional prohibition on casinos, prompting Governor John Kitzhaber to veto the bill.

Since 2005, two businessmen from Lake Oswego have proposed a casino to be built at the defunct Multnomah Greyhound Park. A ballot measure to authorize the plan was defeated in 2010 with 68 percent of voters opposed. The developers attempted another measure on the 2012 ballot, failing yet again with 71% opposed.

== Addiction services ==
Investing more than $6 million annually to reduce and prevent the negative effects of gambling, Oregon's Problem Gambling Services attempts to "minimize gambling's negative impacts while recognizing the reality of gambling's availability, cultural acceptance, and economic appeal". Treatment services are available at no cost to Oregon residents with problems related to gambling, either as a problem gambler or as a friend or family member of one. According to the Oregon Department of Human Services, "services are delivered through 29 outpatient clinics across the state, short-term crisis-respite centers in Grants Pass and St. Helens, a residential treatment center in Salem, and a home-study program for people with less severe problems".

In 1997, Spirit Mountain Casino led all casinos in the state in contributions to the newly established Oregon Gambling Addiction Treatment Foundation, with a contribution of $50,000. Leaders cited a desire to be "responsible actors" in the realm of gambling. (The Oregon State Lottery contributed $20,000.)

== See also ==
- Dotty's
- Jim Elkins
- Gambling in the United States
- Instant Racing
- List of casinos in Oregon
- Seven Feathers Casino Resort
- United States Senate Select Committee on Improper Activities in Labor and Management
