= Wildhorse Resort & Casino =

Casino in Oregon, United States

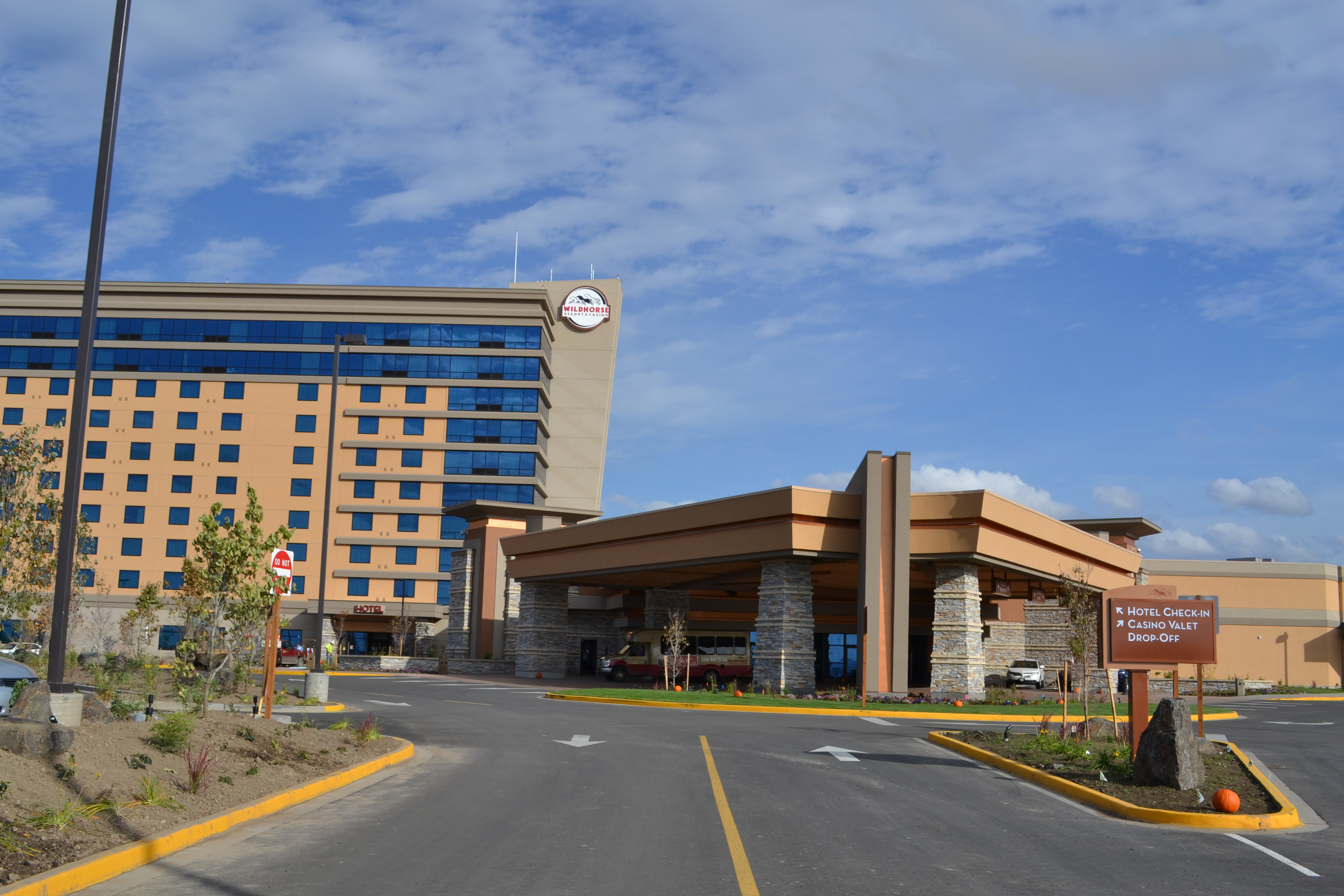
- Main entrance in 2011
- Interactive map of Wildhorse Resort & Casino
- Location: 46510 Wildhorse Blvd. Pendleton, Oregon 97801; 45.647°N 118.679°W
- Opened: November 5, 1994; 31 years ago
- No. of rooms: 301
- Gaming space: 40,000 square feet (3,700 m^{2})
- Notable restaurants: Traditions Dining; The Wildhorse Sports Bar; Plateau Fine Dining
- Casino type: Indian
- Owner: Confederated Tribes of the Umatilla Indian Reservation
- Website: www.wildhorseresort.com

Wildhorse Resort & Casino is a casino owned and operated since 1994 by the Confederated Tribes of the Umatilla Indian Reservation in the U.S. state of Oregon. It is located 5 miles (8.0 km) east of Pendleton, on the Umatilla Indian Reservation, near Interstate 84.

== History ==
The casino opened in temporary buildings on November 5, 1994, run by Capital Gaming International Inc., with the tribe taking over as managers in 1999. The resort has expanded each year since its beginning, doubling the size of the casino in 2002 and 2003, adding a conference center in 2004, completely renovating its 100-room hotel in 2005 and expanding in 2006–07 to add four food and beverage venues: a buffet restaurant, a fine-dining restaurant, a sports bar, a coffee shop and a 24-hour restaurant. After contentious discussion within the tribal community, the previously "dry" (not serving alcoholic beverages) resort, located on a dry reservation, began serving alcoholic beverages on May 5, 2006. Because of this change, a lounge, Wildhorse Sports Bar, opened in May 2007.

=== 2010 expansion ===
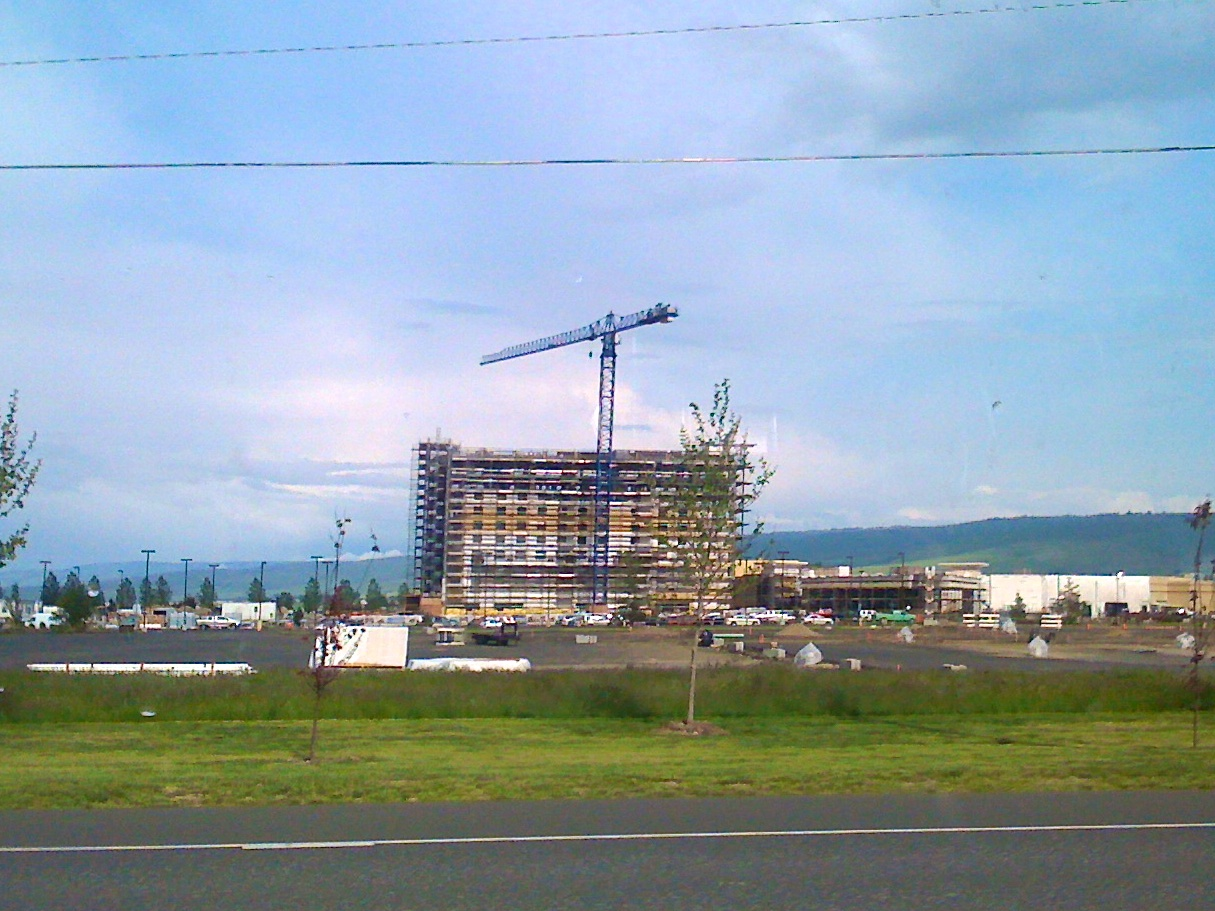
Hotel construction in May 2011

Work begin in 2010 to expand the hotel by 202 rooms with a ten-story tower, and add 24,000 square feet (2,200 m^{2}) to the casino. The $45 million project was completed in October 2011.

== Amenities ==
Key components of the resort are a casino, five screen cineplex with two 3D screens, golf course, hotel, RV park, children's entertainment center, teepee camping village, Arrowhead Travel Plaza and the Tamástslikt Cultural Institute tribal museum. The casino offers poker, roulette, blackjack, craps, Spanish 21, bingo, keno and just over 1,200 slot machines, 30% of which are in a no-smoking area.

The golf course is a championship, 18-hole course designed by John Steidel that opened in 1997, with approximately 30,000 rounds played annually and hosting about 80 tournaments. It includes a driving range, practice greens, rental clubs, a pro shop, and a variety of teaching programs.

Seven restaurants are part of the resort and casino: WildRoast Cafe, the Clubhouse Grill, Hot Rock Cafe, Kinship Cafe, Traditions Buffet, The Wildhorse Sports Bar and Plateau Fine Dining.

The hotel is connected to the casino while the RV Park is located nearby, between the casino and golf course.

The Tamástslikt Cultural Institute, located on the resort grounds, includes permanent and rotating exhibits on the history and culture of the three tribes who make up the Confederated Tribes of the Umatilla Indian Reservation (CTUIR): the Cayuse, Umatilla and Walla Walla.

The resort has sparked an economic boom for the CTUIR, which has increased the tribal operating budget from less than $10 million in 1992 to approximately $145 million in 2007. That grew to $190 million in 2010 as the casino draws approximately 750,000 people each year. The largest expenditures and the largest single department in the tribal government are devoted to protecting and restoring natural resources on the reservation and throughout the traditional homelands of the three tribes. To this end, the tribes are one of the largest employers of biologists and other environmental scientists in the region.

== See also ==
- Gambling in Oregon
- List of casinos in Oregon
