= Confederated Tribes of the Umatilla Indian Reservation =

Indian tribes in Oregon, United States

Confederated Tribes of the Umatilla Native American Reservation (Umatilla, Cayuse, Walla Walla)
Total population
- Enrolled members: 2,916

Regions with significant populations
- United States (Oregon)

Languages
- English, Sahaptin

Religion
- Traditional Religion (Washat), Christianity (incl. syncretistic forms)

Related ethnic groups
- Yakama, Tenino (Warm Springs), Nez Percé

Map of the Umatilla Reservation with neighbouring reservations (In red), east of Pendleton

The Confederated Tribes of the Umatilla Indian Reservation are the federally recognized confederations of three Sahaptin-speaking Native American tribes who traditionally inhabited the Columbia River Plateau region: the Cayuse, Umatilla, and Walla Walla.

When the leaders of the Walla Walla, Cayuse, and Umatilla peoples signed the Treaty of Walla Walla with the United States in 1855, they ceded 6.4 million acres (26,000 km^{2}) of their homeland that is now northeastern Oregon and southeastern Washington. This was done in exchange for a reservation of 250,000 acres (1,000 km^{2}) and the promise of annuities in the form of goods and supplies.

The tribes share the Reservation, which consists of 271 square miles (700 km^{2}) in Umatilla County, in northeast Oregon state. The tribes have created a joint political structure as part of their confederation. The tribal offices are just east of Pendleton, Oregon. Almost half of the reservation land is owned by non-Native Americans; the reservation includes significant portions of the Umatilla River watershed. In 2013 the three-tribe confederation populated about 2,916 people, roughly half of the tribal population live on or near the reservation.

The reservation is also home to about 300 Native Americans enrolled with other Tribes, such as the Yakama, Tenino (Warm Springs), and Nez Percé. 1,500 people who are not Native American also reside within the reservation boundaries.

== History ==
After ceding their territories, the Umatilla, Walla Walla, and Cayuse relocated to what was called the Confederated Tribes of the Umatilla American Indian Reservation (CTUIR). In exchange for ceding most of their territories they received supplies and annuities from the federal government, who then tried to encourage them to take up subsistence farming. Many times the supplies were late in coming or were inadequate for the population.

In 1887, under the Allotment Act, communal land was distributed to households. This and other legislation made it possible for the members to sell their lands but they were preyed on by speculators and swindlers. Gradually the tribe took back communal control of its land and has regained more than 14,000 acres (57 km^{2}) of what was lost.

In addition, in the 20th century tribe pursued a major land claim case against the federal government, saying that the three tribes had traditionally controlled one million more acres of land than they had been compensated for following the 1855 treaty. The Indian Claims Commission awarded the confederated tribes several million dollars in a negotiated settlement. They used some of that money in economic development efforts. They also paid per capita claims to tribal members for another part of it.

== Government ==
The tribe re-established its government in 1949, writing a constitution that provided for the election of members to the General Council. It is governed by a nine-member council, known as the board of trustees who are elected by the General Council. They serve two-year terms and are elected on staggered terms. This Board replaced the rule by hereditary chiefs.

There is a tribal police force called the Umatilla Tribal Police Department.

== Justice ==
=== Pilot Project of VAWA 2013 ===
Since the Supreme Court's majority opinion in Oliphant v. Suquamish Indian Tribe, the tribal courts were prevented to trial a person who is not Native American, unless specifically authorized by the Congress. This body allowed the right for the tribal courts to consider a lawsuit where a man who is not Native American commits domestic violence towards a Native American woman on the territory of a Native American Tribe, through the passage of Violence Against Women Reauthorization Act of 2013 (VAWA 2013) signed into law on March 7, 2013, by President Barack Obama. This was motivated by the high percentage of Native American women being assaulted by men who are not Native American, feeling immune by the lack of jurisdiction of Tribal Courts upon them. This law generally took effect on March 7, 2015, but also authorized a voluntary "Pilot Project" to allow certain tribes to begin exercising special jurisdiction earlier. On February 6, 2014, three tribes were selected for this Pilot Project: the Pascua Yaqui Tribe (Arizona), the Tulalip Tribes of Washington, and the Confederated Tribes of the Umatilla Indian Reservation (Oregon).

The Bureau of Justice along with Tribal Judicial members and the American Probation and Parole Association are working together to come up with effective ways to enhance sentencing on tribal lands. Under the Tribal Law & Order Act of 2010, these groups have made changes to find better ways of achieving justice on the tribal lands. This gives them the authority to provide enhanced sentences and offers a checklist for the tribes to follow in sentencing. It also gives them the options for detention or community correction options for sentencing

== Economy ==
The tribe have been working for nearly three decades since the late twentieth century to restore fish habitats and runs of the Umatilla and Grande Ronde rivers. It is buying back land in watersheds of the Umatilla on its reservation, to preserve habitat.

In the early 1980s, under the tribe's leadership, salmon were reintroduced in the Umatilla River. The tribe, along with the state of Oregon, operate egg-taking, spawning, and other propagation facilities that are helping restore salmon runs. In 1984, the first fall Chinook salmon in some 70 years returned to the Umatilla River. As a member of the Columbia River Inter-Tribal Fish Commission, the CTUIR also shares management of the Columbia, Snake, Walla Walla, Tucannon, John Day, and Imnaha river basins. "In recent times, tribal fisheries have occurred only on the Umatilla and Columbia rivers."

The Confederated Tribes opened the Wildhorse Resort & Casino, which now has a hotel and seven restaurants, located four miles east of Pendleton. It also has a golf course. The Wildhorse Casino opened in 1995. The revenues generated from gaming have multiplied the tribe's budget by sevenfold, making money available for health, education, housing and economic development. Unemployment on the reservation has been cut by half. Several hundred people work at the resort, and 300 work for the tribe's Cayuse Technologies, which opened in 2006 to provide services in software development, a call center, and word processing.

The CTUIR publishes the monthly newspaper, Confederated Umatilla Journal. It also operates a radio station: KCUW.

The CTUIR is one of several tribal governments in the northwestern United States to offer free bus service on its reservation.

== Culture and religion ==
The traditional religion practiced by many tribal members is called Seven Drums (Washat). The Umatilla Reservation has a religion prominent in both past and present culture that is in relation to spirits and energies where things such as health and weather are controlled by spiritually powerful men and woman called "Shamans." One can develop a stronger spirit, therefore, be more embedded within this religion by fasting and spending time with oneself in remote areas.

The confederated tribes established Tamástslikt Cultural Institute, operating in Pendleton, Oregon, as a museum to represent its people. It tells traditional stories of the Natítyat (Indian people), has exhibits of traditional clothing and tools, as well as art and crafts by contemporary people, and exhibits representing the contemporary world.

As an aspect of contemporary culture, basketball is the most popular sport played on the reservation. Kids start playing from a young age, and many families install basketball hoops at their homes. In 2013 the sisters Shoni and Jude Schimmel from CTUIR, students and basketball players at University of Louisville, played in the NCAA's Final Four tournament.

One rich part of past culture was, when one passed in a close-knit tribe, the corpse would be dressed in the nicest clothing that could be afforded and have their faces ornately painted. Some days later they would then be buried with their belongings. People in mourning upon a person's death would dress in unkempt clothing and would cut their hair.

In July 1996, ancient remains of a man were found near Kennewick, Washington. He has been called Kennewick Man or the "Ancient One" (by Native Americans). CTUIR joined with the Nez Perce Tribe, Confederated Tribes and Bands of the Yakama Nation, Confederated Tribes of the Colville Reservation and the Wanapum Band in seeking to have the remains reburied as required by traditional tribal law and according to the 1990 federal Native American Graves Protection and Repatriation Act (NAGPRA). The remains were estimated to be 9,000 years old and scientists wanted to study them. A series of court cases followed; in 2004 the 9th Circuit Court of Appeals ruled to allow more studies before releasing the remains to the tribes. CTUIR decided not to pursue any more legal action but is seeking to strengthen NAGPRA.

The Confederated Tribes work closely with the Umatilla and Wallowa-Whitman National Forests to identify and protect cultural resources on national forest lands in the region; the tribes retain treaty hunting and fishing rights in the area as well.

== Revitalization of language ==
The tribe has developed schools and language curricula to teach and preserve its native languages. These are endangered, as the tribe has only about five native speakers of Walla Walla language and about 50 native speakers of Umatilla language, both of the Sahaptin family. It is concentrating on the more widely shared languages, as Cayuse became extinct by the end of the 19th century. Weyíiletpuu is a dialect of the Nez Perce language as used by the Cayuse people of the Confederated Tribes of the Umatilla Indian Reservation.

Today six language teachers are running programs at the Nixyaawii Community School, which has offered Umatilla, Walla Walla and Nez Perce language classes for the last decade. The tribe is developing Cay-Uma-Wa, a Head Start Program to include teaching native languages. In addition, the tribe has developed online video resources and the Tamaluut immersion school, designed for 3- to 5-year-olds. At the Pendleton Round-up in September 2013, a young CTUIR woman sang "The Star Spangled Banner" in Umatilla, a first at that event.

== Notable CTUIR citizens ==
- Elaine Miles, actor
- Kelsey Motanic, first Umatilla medical doctor, graduated from University of New Mexico
- Charles Sams, National Park Service director
- Shoni and Jude Schimmel, basketball players respectively with the WNBA's Atlanta Dream and University of Louisville women's basketball team, who made the Women's Final Four in April 2013.

== Direct descendants ==
- Dan Henderson, mixed martial artist, his grandmother is a CTUIR citizen.

== See also ==
- List of Native American Tribal Entities in Oregon
