= Multnomah Greyhound Park =

Greyhound dog track in Wood Village, Oregon

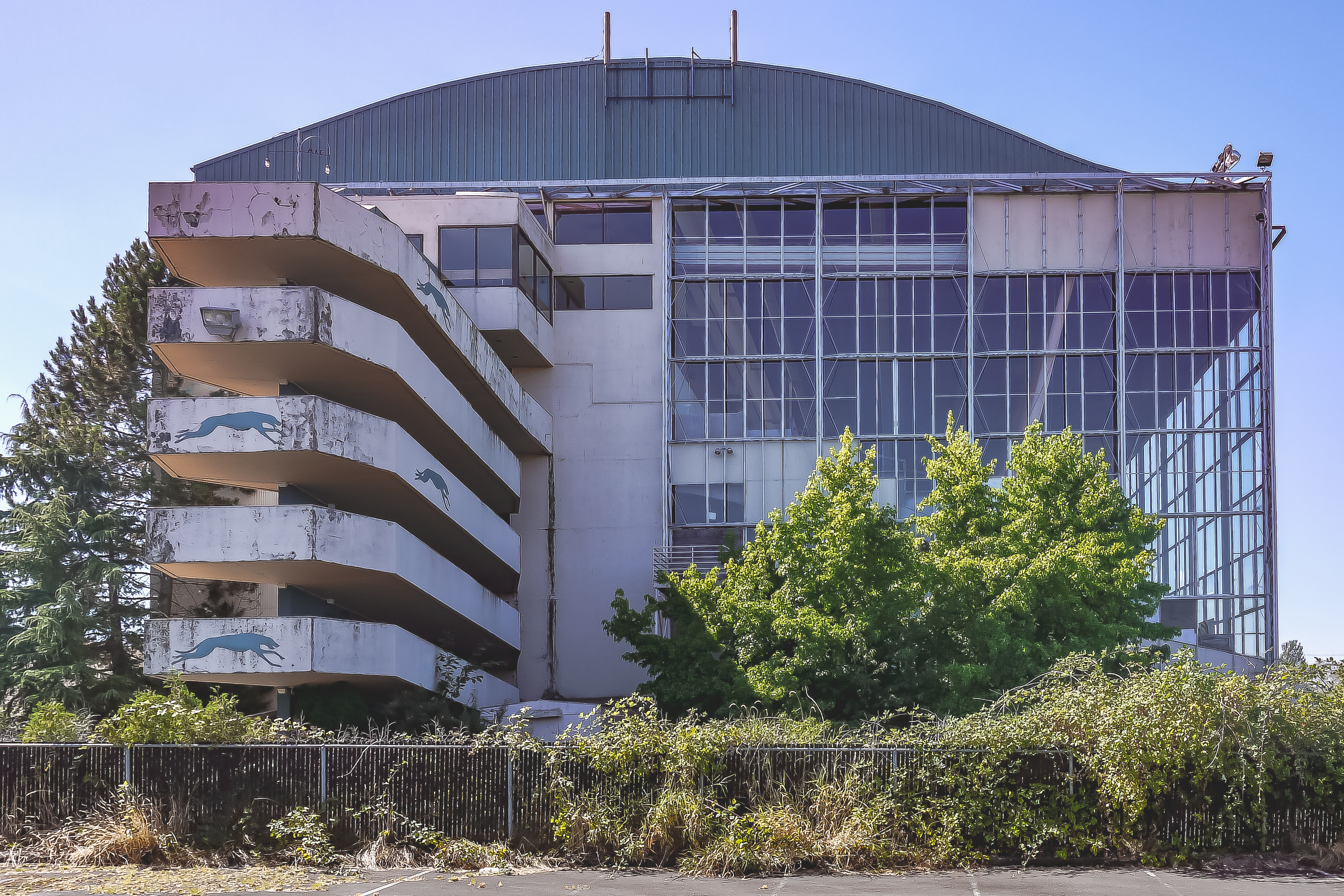
- Location: Wood Village, Oregon
- Coordinates: 45.531°N 122.431°W
- Date opened: 1957
- Date closed: 2004
- Race type: Greyhound

Multnomah Greyhound Park was a greyhound dog track located in Wood Village, Oregon, part of the Portland metropolitan area. The park opened in 1957 and closed in 2004. After standing empty and disused for almost 12 years, the buildings at the site were demolished in summer 2016.

== History ==
Greyhound racing in the Portland metropolitan area began in 1933, organized by the Multnomah Kennel Club (MKC) and held at Multnomah Stadium (now Providence Park). In 1956, dog racing moved to Portland Meadows, after the stadium's owners notified MKC that the club would have to find a new venue, to make room at the stadium for the Portland Beavers baseball team, which was set to relocate from Vaughn Street Park. Greyhound races were only held at Portland Meadows – which was primarily a horse racing track – for one season, the 1956 season (Aug. 13–Oct. 17, 1956).

In January 1956, MKC purchased a 90-acre (36 ha) site in Wood Village, Oregon, with plans to build a new dog track and stadium there. The new dedicated greyhound racing track opened in 1957 and was originally named Fairview Park, but in 1978 it was renamed Murray Kemp Greyhound Park in honor of MKC's founder and longtime president. In 1991, the name was changed to Multnomah Greyhound Park.

1987 would mark the track's record season for attendance with 611,430; after the 1987 season the Multnomah Kennel Club would claim that greyhound racing was "the number one spectator sport in the state." Throughout the 1990s, the track's attendance would continue on a steady decline. In December 2004, the track's owner, Magna Entertainment, refused to renew their lease on the building. This would mark the end of use for Multnomah Greyhound Park and the end of greyhound racing in Oregon. The track would go to great lengths to try to ensure that all remaining greyhounds were adopted and sold for an average of $175 each to avoid greyhound homelessness.

Within months of the park's closure, two businessmen from Lake Oswego proposed a $490-million casino and entertainment complex to be built on the site. A ballot measure to authorize the plan was defeated in 2010 with 68 percent of voters opposed. Two ballot measures (Measures 82 and 83) which would have allowed building of a casino at the park were both soundly defeated in November 2012.

In October 2015, "the Grand Ronde tribal confederation announced it was purchasing the defunct greyhound racetrack in Wood Village, sparking new speculation about whether a casino could end up on the site." The purchase by the Confederated Tribes of the Grand Ronde Community of Oregon was completed in December 2015. What type of redevelopment will take place on the property has not been decided, but demolition of the then-existing buildings began at the end of June 2016.

== The track ==
The track's max capacity was 18,760 people with a seating capacity of 6,064. The track's length was 1,382.5 feet (421.4 m; 0.26184 mi) and was made of sand from the Columbia River. The kennel area had a maximum capacity of 840 greyhounds.

== Other uses ==
Team Oregon conducts motorcycle safety training in a portion of the parking lot and the former kennels.

== See also ==
- Gambling in Oregon
