= Three Rivers Casino and Resort =

Three Rivers Casino Resort
- Three Rivers Casino and Resort Logo

- Front of the hotel
- Interactive map of Three Rivers Casino Resort
- Location: 5647 OR-126, Florence, OR 97439; 43.98046°N 124.08722°W
- Opened: 2004
- No. of rooms: 93
- Notable restaurants: Blue Bills; Beachside Bistro; Bonfire
- Casino type: Class III
- Owner: Confederated Tribes of Coos, Lower Umpqua, & Siuslaw Indians
- Renovated in: RV Park: 2026
- Website: https://www.threeriverscasino.com/

The Three Rivers Casino and Resort is a resort on the Central Oregon Coast. There are two locations, one in Florence and one in Coos Bay.

It is owned by the Confederated Tribes of Coos, Lower Umpqua, & Siuslaw Indians. The resort is named for the Coos, Umpqua, and Siuslaw rivers, which flow into the Pacific Ocean in southern Oregon. The Florence location, opened in 2004, includes a 93-room hotel, opened in 2007, and adjoining Ocean Dunes Golf Course, purchased in 2012. It is the second-largest employer in the city. The Coos Bay location was opened in May 2015.

== See also ==
- Gambling in Oregon
- Casino
- Indian Gaming Regulatory Act
