= Cow Creek Band of Umpqua Tribe of Indians =

Indian tribe in Oregon, United States

Cow Creek Band
Nahánkʰuotana (Takelma)

Regions with significant populations
- United States; Oregon

Languages
- Takelma, English

Related ethnic groups
- Upper Umpqua Targunsans, Milwaletas, Takelmas

The Cow Creek Band of Umpqua Tribe of Indians (Takelma: Nahánkʰuotana), known to the Bureau of Indian Affairs (BIA) as the Cow Creek Band of Umpqua Indians of Oregon is a federally recognized tribe based in Roseburg, Oregon, United States. The tribe takes its name from Cow Creek, a tributary of the South Umpqua River.

Map of the Cow Creek Reservation and its off-reservation trust lands with neighbouring reservations (In pink)

== History ==
=== Origins ===
The Cow Creek Band of Umpqua Tribe of Indians are descended from several different historical tribal entities, including Upper Umpqua Targunsans, Milwaletas, Takelmas, and possibly some Southern Molallas. The Cow Creek band were seasonally migratory, making use of permanent winter encampments and moving villages in pursuit of food sources during the warmer months.

In October 1855, the Rogue River War erupted in the area and the peoples of the Cow Creek Band fled for safety in the hills, joining others there who similarly faced removal from their traditional homeland for concentration on the Grand Ronde Reservation located to the north. This relocation proved inevitable however, and in January 1856 the bulk of the Cow Creek Band was moved to Grand Ronde, many forced to walk beside the inadequate number of eight wagons suppplied for the move. Some refused to leave, however, with half the Milwaleta people dying of starvation and exposure when they remained in the hills. Several indigenous people were shot during armed forays into the hills in search of stragglers.

The mountainous terrain near today's Canyonville provided cover for some, however, and efforts in May 1856 by Oregon Indian Agent James P. Day and in 1860 by the re-activated United States Army failed to round up remaining members of the Cow Creek Band. The tribe survived by intermarrying with Métis fur trappers.

=== Claims ===
In 1910, the Cow Creek Band made its first attempt to regain a portion of its homeland through the legislative process. A bill was passed to compensate the tribe in 1932, only to be vetoed by President Herbert Hoover.

Litigation commenced in 1936, with the Band in the case Rogue River Tribe of Indians v. United States (64 F. Supp. 339, Ct. Cl.). A second hearing was held four years later (89 F. Supp. 789, Ct. Cl.). Only two of the 17 tribes participating in these cases were successful, however, and the claim of the Cow Creek Band was dismissed.

Decades of litigation followed, marked by a series of legal defeats based on aspects of the law surrounding the Indian Claims Commission. This was reversed on May 26, 1980, however, when the United States Congress passed legislation paving the way for a lawsuit against the government on the basis that the amount paid by the federal government for tribal lands was unconscionably low. On December 29, 1982, an act of Congress granted the Cow Creek Tribal recognition.

=== The Cow Creek Band today ===
In the 21st century, the Cow Creek Band of Umpqua Tribe of Indians is one of nine federally recognized tribal governments in Oregon and includes over 1400 members.

Among the economic ventures of the Cow Creek Band is the Seven Feathers Hotel & Casino Resort, located at Canyonville, Oregon.

== See also ==
- List of federally recognized Native American tribes in Oregon
- Umpqua people
