= Tribal policing in Oregon =

As of 2022, of the nine reservations in Oregon, six have tribal police organizations. These six forces are the Burns Paiute Tribal Police Department, the Coquille Indian Tribal Police Department, the Confederated Tribes of Grande Ronde Tribal Police, the Umatilla Tribal Police Department, Cow Creek Umpqua Tribal Police Department and the Warm Springs Tribal Police Department. The Columbia River Inter-Tribal Fisheries Commission also has an enforcement department. These units are restricted to working only on designated reservation property, and are often limited in number and available resources. Membership in Oregon tribal police forces ranges from four (Burns Paiute Tribal Police Department) to 25 individuals (Umatilla Tribal Police Department), and as of 2022, all registered tribal police in Oregon are men. Most members work as full time police, but most reservation police forces also employ civilians who work other jobs, but can be called in under emergency circumstances. The number of civilian reserve members ranges from none in the Coquille Indian Tribal Police Department, to six in the Umatilla Tribal Police Department.

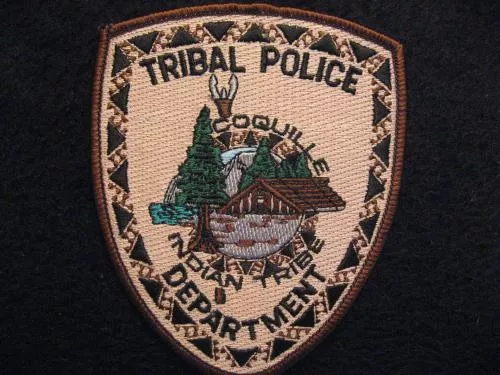
Coquille Tribal Police Patch

Tribal police are in charge of many of the same things as federal police officers, but are confined to the specific boundaries of the reservations that they operate on. They generally work patrol based jobs, similarly to other government police forces, and are in charge of enforcing driving regulations, investigating crimes, security work, and they have full jurisdiction to arrest people violating the law on reservation land. Once a suspected criminal has left reservation boundaries, they are technically no longer under the jurisdiction of tribal police, and can now only be charged by the police units of other jurisdictions. This frequently means that tribal and state police forces must collaborate, but also has led to problems and disputes historically.

== History of crime on Oregon reservations ==
Native American communities in Oregon have indicated there is a lack of trust with their communities and other governments, especially regarding police. This has also led to negative perceptions of the outcomes of criminal investigations.

Crime data is not always consistent in its sharing with tribal governments; local, state, and federal partners, and in some instances not occurring. This has caused many tribal departments to work independently, with limited access to reports and statistical reporting. In addition, because of the disconnect between tribal communities and tribal police, there are indications that the number of missing Native American women on tribal lands is potentially underreported. Despite this, according to a National Institute of Justice study, 84% of Native American women have experienced some form of violence in their lifetime, with more than 55% having suffered from physical or sexual violence.

A study done by The Work Group Examining Law Enforcement Data Systems (LEDS) in 2020 found that out of 1213 reported missing persons in Oregon, 13 were Native American, or Alaskan Native women. Of these 13 women, the average age was 20.8 years old, with 69% of the reported Native American or Alaskan Native women being under the age of 18.

In another study done by the Work Group, participants living off of Oregon reservations stated that when a crime or missing persons report was made, participants reported that they did not expect the police to act or expect to be believed or taken seriously.

The combined factors of limited data, limited data sharing, and Tribal members stating a general distrust of the government and police have allowed only a vague scope of the status of crime on Oregon reservations and their communities.

== Policy reforms affecting reservation police ==
A ruling by the Supreme Court in 1978 denied tribal police the authority to arrest or enforce laws against non-tribal members. This meant that not only could tribal police not follow suspects off of reservation land, but could now not even prosecute non-members on reservation land. In order to be granted this authority, they legally had to be deputized by a state sheriff, and this was an extremely rare occurrence at the time. This also took away many abilities of tribal police to coordinate with state police, and caused confusion in cases that fell onto or near reservation boundaries. Many criminals would take advantage of this complicated bureaucracy, and would frequently commit their crimes on or near the reservation boundary as it was notoriously difficult for the two police forces to organize and prosecute crime in those areas.

On July 28, 2011, Oregon Governor John Kitzhaber, passed a bill that changed the way in which tribal police forces would be granted authority. Under this new bill, tribal police would no longer need to be deputized in order to have full jurisdiction, but instead would simply need to have passed a certain level of training. The goal of this bill was to help tribal police better enforce the law on their reservations while also increasing their coordination and response times with state police. This bill would help eliminate some of the complicated bureaucracy that allowed criminals to more easily escape in certain reservation areas. Now, tribal police have the authority to arrest non-members on reservation property should they be caught or suspected of criminal activity. It also has increased the efficiency of both tribal police forces and adjacent state police forces.
