= Columbia River Inter-Tribal Fish Commission =

The Columbia River Inter-Tribal Fish Commission (CRITFC) is a fishery resource for the treaty tribes of the Columbia River. Under the treaty, the native tribes, the Nez Perce Tribe, Warm Springs Reservation Tribe, and Umatilla Indian Reservation Tribe, have to the right to fish in the Columbia River, which means their fishery must be reserved and protected. CRITFC also serves as a tribal police force.

== History ==
As stated in The First Oregonians, "The Yakama Nation, the Confederated Tribes of Warm Springs, the Confederated Tribes of the Umatilla Indian Reservation, and the Nez Perce Tribe, who reserved the rights to fish under 1855 treaties with the United States, found CRITFC in 1977.” Their members may fish at all usual and accustomed fishing locations in the Columbia River Basin. The rights includes ceremonial, subsistence, and commercial fisheries.

In an article by Government Innovators Network, Innovations Harvard in 1977 the tribes of Yakama, Umatilla, Nez Perce, and Warm Springs decided to converge together because of the growing problem of salmon not being restored. This was because the federal and state government for over 100 years have been using salmon as something to mass harvest than to protect. This group that collaborated created what's known as the Columbia River Inter- Tribal Fish Commission (CRITFC). Their main goal is to look at salmon as not to be seen as something of natural resource to be used at such a big project, but to have them be restored and saved for the tribes, and people in the Pacific Northwest. The CRITFC first had to go through multiple steps in order to create the commission such as fundraising, fish management, habitat restoration, and many more steps. Currently in Portland Oregon is where their headquarters is located, and is directed by members of the four tribes. CRITFC has much strength when it comes to how they operate including the many programs that are utilized such as fishery management.

== Impact ==
In 1986, CRITFC successfully sued to prevent new hydropower projects in areas that the Commission deemed to be a protected area for salmon. A couple years later in 1988, a plan was signed to protect a very important run of fall chinook salmon.

In 1994, CRITFC brought training to youth and adults to help create a better environment for salmon. They did this by planting trees, which can help regulate water temperature and create erosion-resistant banks, as well as checking water temperature and observing data.

In 2011 the Condit Dam was removed because it was blocking fish from traveling upstream to the places they used to spawn before the dam was constructed. The removal of this dam not only helped with temperature of the water to be more regulated, but also opened up passage for fish to travel further upstream to their natural spawning grounds the salmon may have used for thousands of years.

CRITFC has also been involved with recruiting biologists, lawyers, hydrologists, and public relations professionals to aid in the various efforts needed to create and maintain of better habitats for salmon.

=== Future plans ===
CRITFC has been very involved in restoring salmon habitat over the past 40 years and plan to continue into the future. Plans for future involve making sure that the federal government reduces funding for anything that may set back CRITFC's efforts, and helping the growth and return of salmon. They are also working on an issue of contamination in the Columbia River Basin; they hope to find a way to eliminate the toxic chemicals that are currently polluting the river.

== Fish market ==
In order to assist the tribal fishers to maintain their traditions and supplement their incomes, CRITFC promoted “direct-to-public” sales at fishing sites, that were built by the U.S. Army Corps of Engineers, in the Columbia River. CRITFC is currently encourages fishers to participate through a fisher marketing project of the Chef's Collaborative called Fish-Chef Connection. CRITFC and Ecotrust is working with Food Innovation Center on a value-added products for tule fish, which are low-end, white-fleshed fish that usually, after market, left over. With the ability to create a value-added product, it is likely that fisher's income will raise after fishing season. According to The First Oregonians, “The Columbia River Inter-Fish Commission estimates that for every ten dollars generated by fish sales, as much as seven dollars is contributed to local economies.”

== Dioxin discovery ==
A survey was conducted to the Environmental Protection Agency (EPA) and revealed that tribal members who caught and consumed fish near the Columbia River Intern-Tribe Fish Commission may be at a higher risk of toxin disease because they consume more fish than most people in America. Because of these concerns, the EPA worked with CRITFC to investigate the fish consumption between 1990 and 1991 and found out that the entire Columbia River in Oregon, and the Snake River in Washington, contained toxic chemical products. It was contaminated because of industrial polluters. Since this revelation, CRITFC and EPA partnered with other agencies and find existing toxins in the river while helping native tribe members who were affected by the toxins.
