= Seven Feathers Casino Resort =

Hotel and casino in Canyonville, Oregon, United States

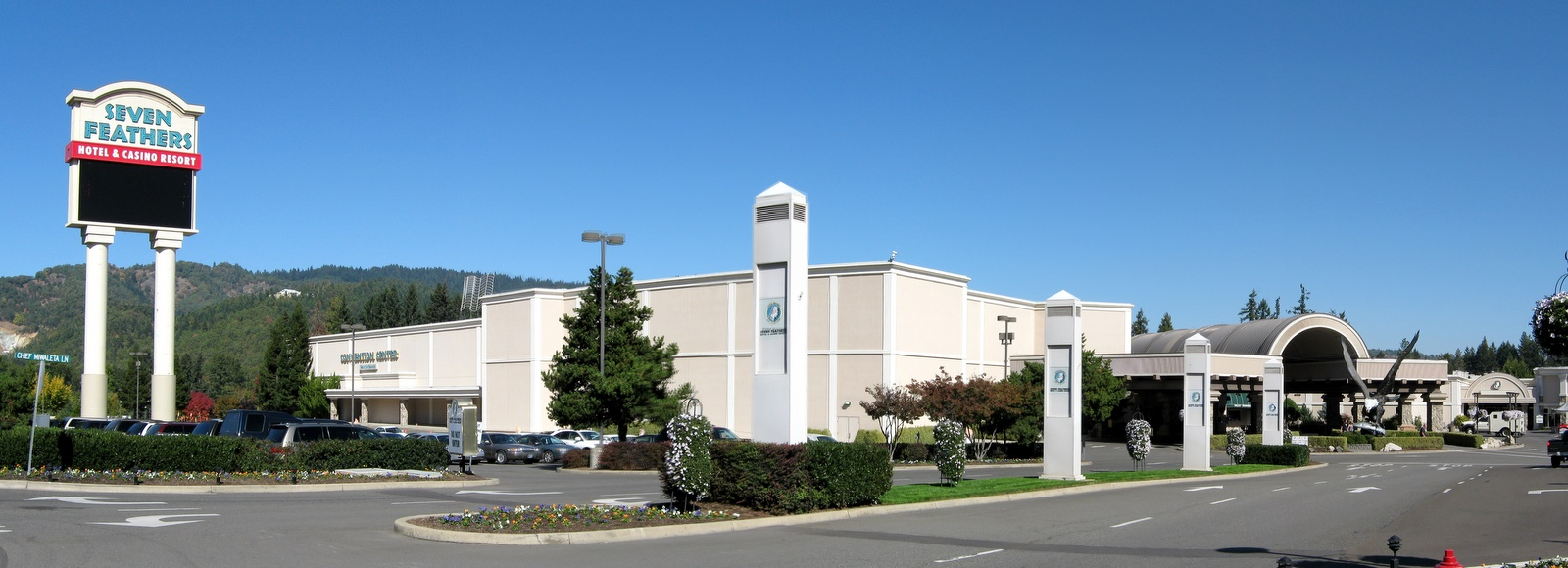
- Entrance to Seven Feathers

- Location in Oregon
- Interactive map of Seven Feathers Casino Resort
- Location: Canyonville, Oregon; 146 Chief Miwaleta Lane Canyonville, Oregon 97417; 42°56′21.36″N 123°17′03.36″W
- Opened: April 1992
- Theme: Native American
- No. of rooms: 298
- Gaming space: 68,000 square feet (6,000 m^{2})
- Signature attractions: Skookum Hyak (Bronze Eagle Statue)
- Notable restaurants: Cow Creek Restaurant; K-Bar Steak House; Steelhead Lounge; Stix Sports Bar; Takelma Roasting Company
- Owner: Cow Creek Band of Umpqua Tribe of Indians
- Previous names: Cow Creek Bingo Hall
- Renovated in: 1999, 2003
- Website: www.sevenfeathers.com

Seven Feathers Casino Resort is a 298-room, AAA three-star hotel and casino located in Canyonville, Oregon, United States. The casino is owned by the Cow Creek Band of Umpqua Tribe of Indians. At 232,500 square feet (21,600 m^{2}), with 68,000 square feet (6,300 m^{2}) of gaming space, it is the largest facility of its kind in Southern Oregon. The resort attracts over one million visitors annually.

== History ==
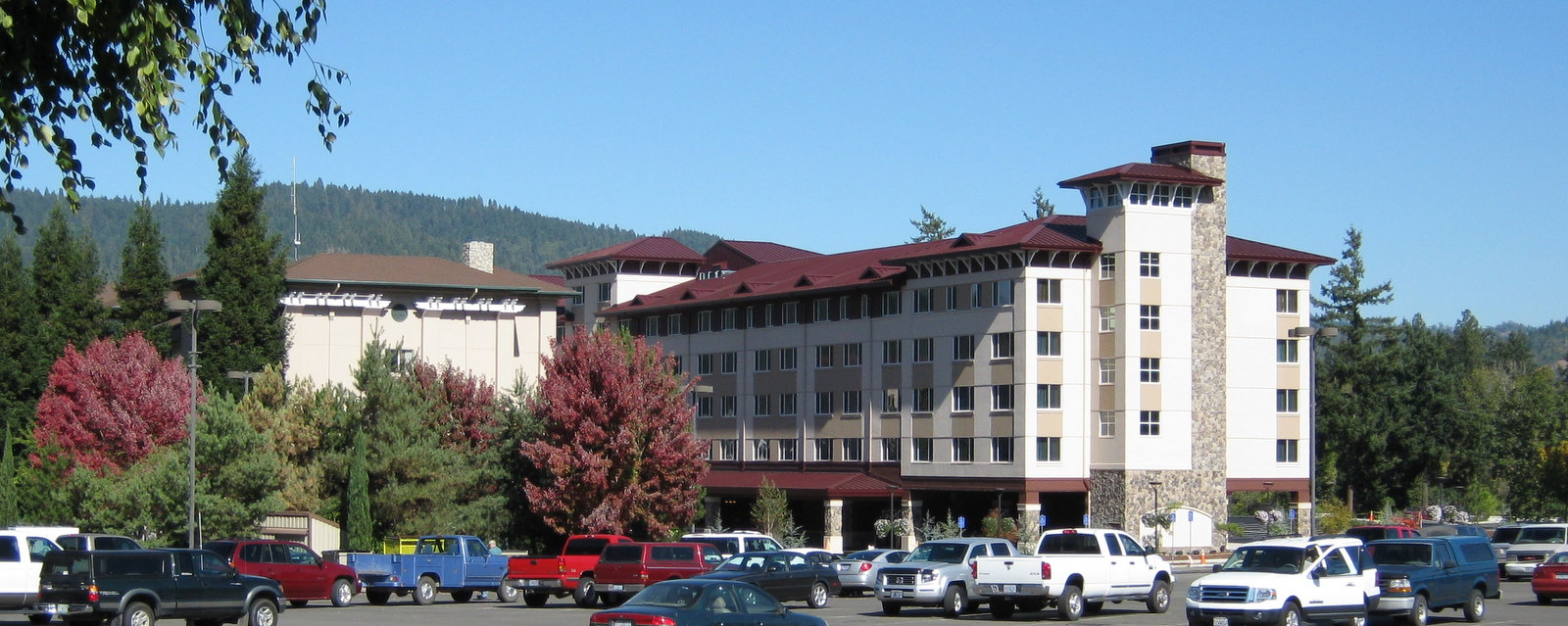
Hotel buildings.

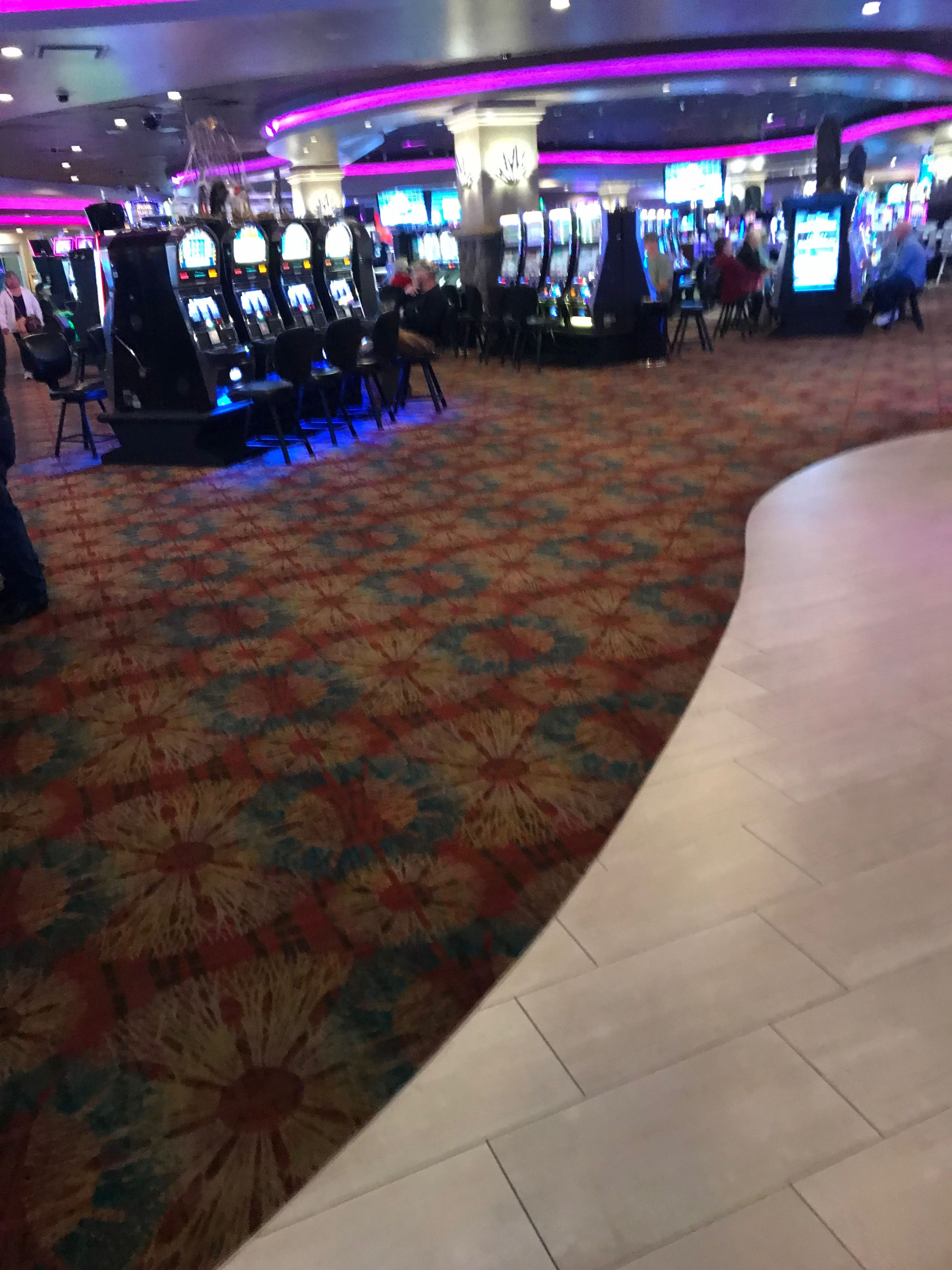
The casino floor.

The casino originally opened as the 450-seat Cow Creek Bingo Hall in April 1992. It was then expanded into a casino in 1994, and expanded again in 1999, 2003, and 2009. A 147-room hotel was constructed alongside the casino in 1996, and 151 more rooms were added in 2009. The resort added a 191-space RV park in the summer of 2006.

== See also ==
- Gambling in Oregon
- Native American gaming
