= List of federally recognized Native American tribes in Oregon =

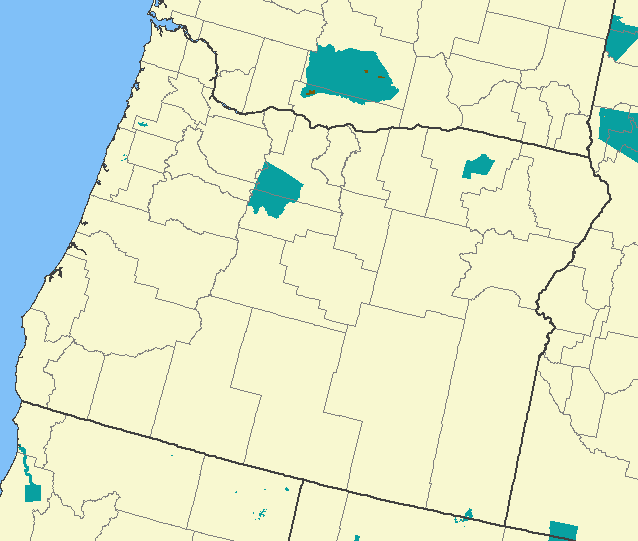
Indian land

This is a list of federally recognized Native American tribes in Oregon.

These Indian tribes are recognized by the United States Bureau of Indian Affairs for certain federal government purposes. These tribal governmental agencies and confederations may or may not correspond with individual tribes who historically have lived in Oregon.

== Oregon tribes ==
As of 2008, there were nine federally recognized tribes in Oregon. They are listed here by the names by which the governments call themselves. Their BIA names may be different.

(See Native American tribes in Oregon for the individual tribes and bands.)

- Burns Paiute Tribe
- Confederated Tribes of the Coos, Lower Umpqua and Siuslaw Indians
- Confederated Tribes of the Grand Ronde Community of Oregon
- Confederated Tribes of Siletz Indians
- Confederated Tribes of the Umatilla Indian Reservation
- Confederated Tribes of Warm Springs
- Coquille Indian Tribe
- Cow Creek Band of Umpqua Tribe of Indians
- Klamath Tribes

== Nevada/Oregon tribes ==
There is one federally recognized tribe who live on the border of Oregon and Nevada:

- Fort McDermitt Paiute and Shoshone Tribes

== Oregon/Washington tribes ==
The Chinook Indian Nation of Oregon and Washington is a group of Chinookan people who were briefly recognized by the U.S. Government in 2001, but this recognition was reversed in 2002.

== Unrecognized tribes ==
There are several other tribes whose petitions for federal recognition have failed for various reasons. One of these groups is the Clatsop-Nehalem Confederated Tribes of Oregon, a group of Clatsop and Tillamook (also known as the Nehalem) who live on the northern Oregon Coast.

== See also ==
- List of Indian reservations in Oregon
- List of casinos in Oregon (all current casinos in Oregon are Native American owned)
- Lists of Oregon-related topics
