= Portland Meadows =

Horse racing venue in Portland, Oregon, U.S.

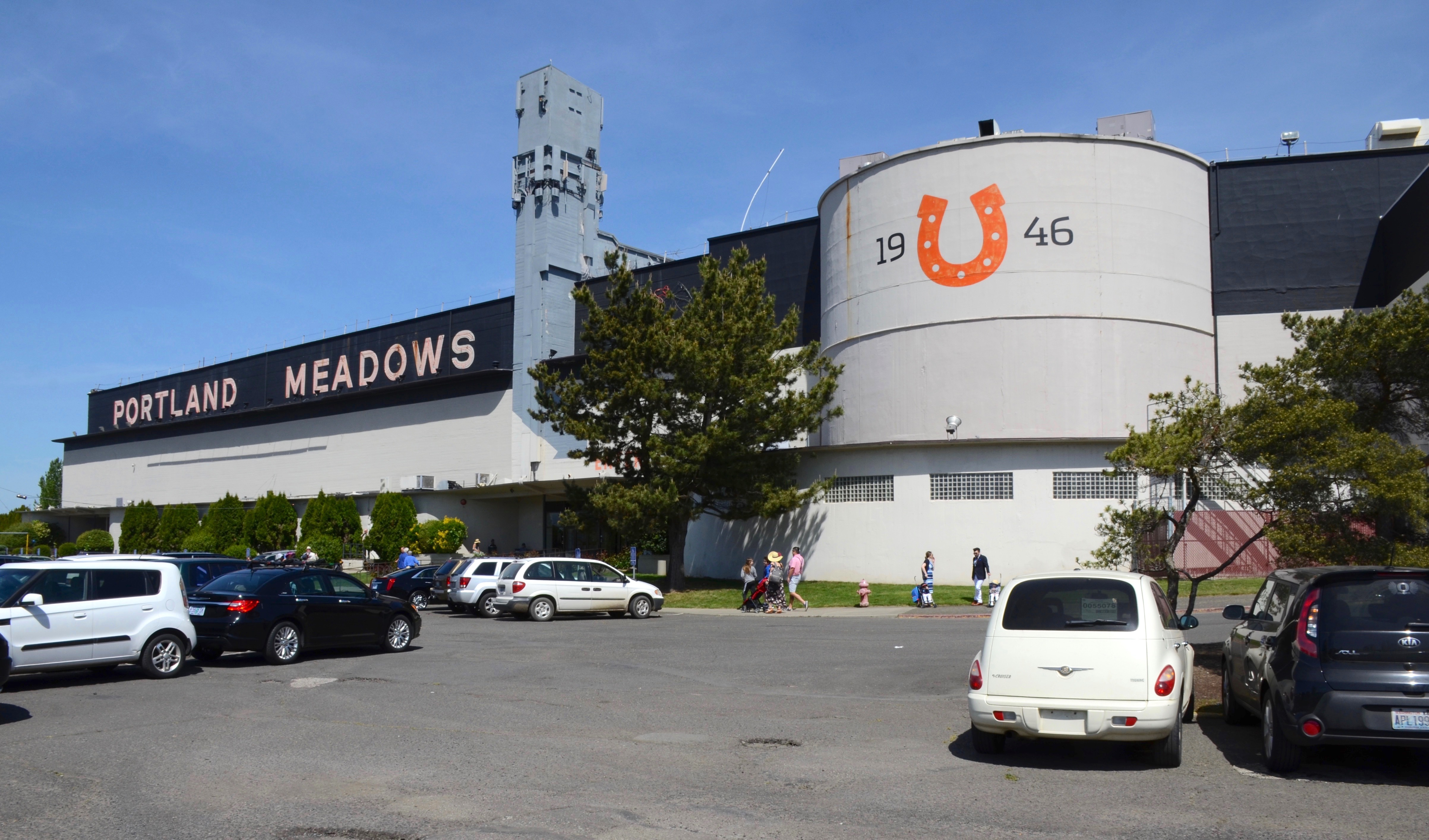
- Old racetrack photo
- Interactive map of Portland Meadows
- Location: (New Address: 8102 NE Killingsworth St. Portland, OR 97218) as of 3/4/2020
- Coordinates: 45°35′29″N 122°40′22″W
- Owned by: Artemis Entertainment LLC
- Date opened: 1946
- Date closed: December 2019
- Course type: Dirt
- Notable races: Portland Mile

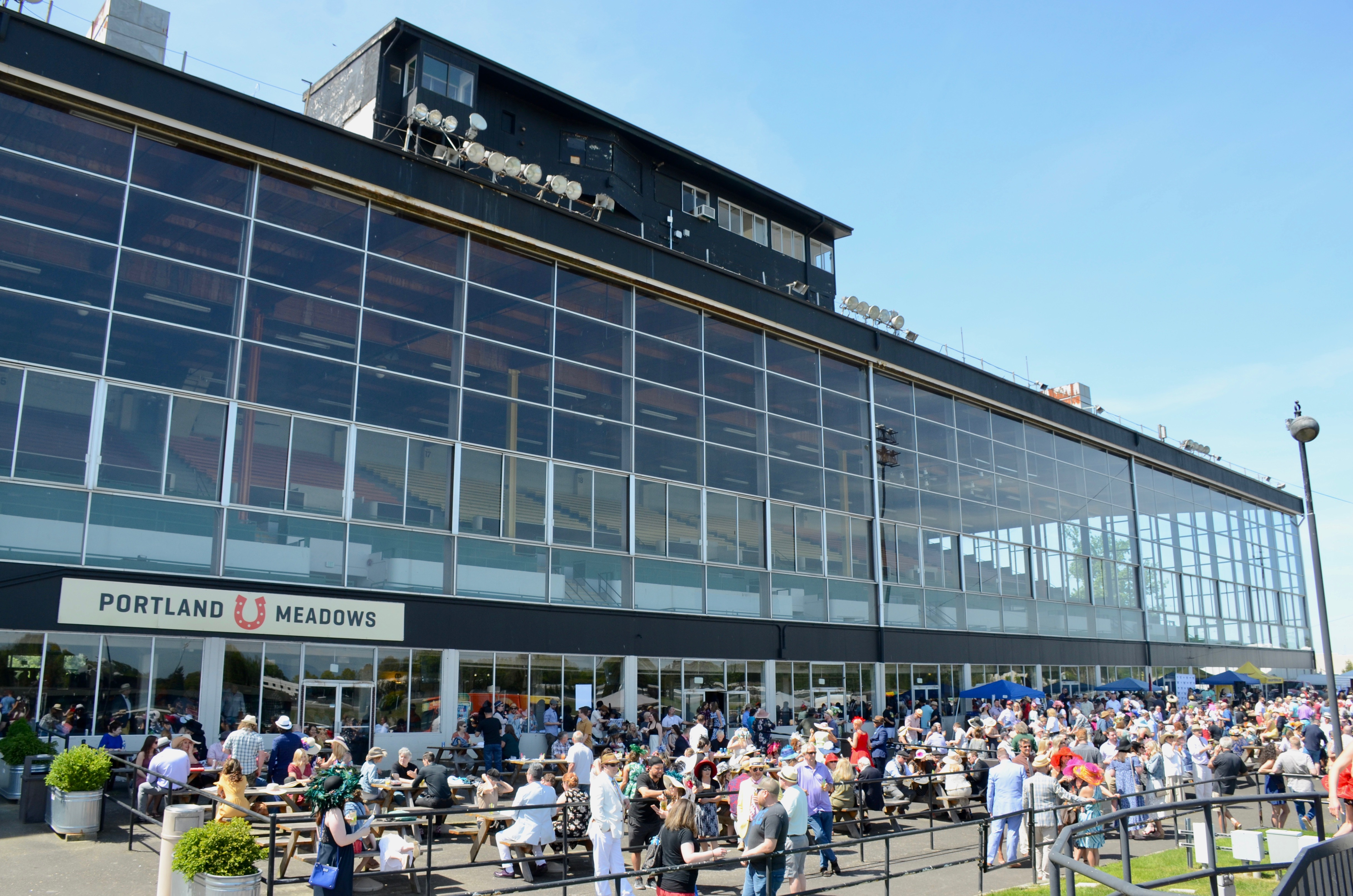
Trackside view of east exterior

Portland Meadows was an American horse racing venue in Portland, Oregon, owned by The Stronach Group since July 3, 2011 and previously owned by MI Developments Inc. (MID) 2001. Built by William P. Kyne, who also built Bay Meadows Racetrack in San Mateo, California, the facility opened on September 14, 1946. The track's closure was announced in March 2019, following the conclusion of the 2018-19 racing season, with the property slated for redevelopment. The last day for simulcast racing was December 7, 2019 and the poker room closed December 15, 2019. Demolition began in February 2020.

The track has hosted both American Quarter Horse racing and Thoroughbred horse races. Over the years, Portland Meadows has been the site of numerous outdoor music concerts and other forms of entertainment. The national high school cross country running championship, the Nike Cross Nationals, have been held at Portland Meadows.

The grounds are in Hayden Meadows near the Columbia River and are 16 feet (4.9 m) above sea-level.

== Track history ==
In 1945, construction began of Portland Meadows on November 20, under the direction of William P. Kyne. Kyne is also known as the founder of Bay Meadows Racecourse and he was largely responsible for the passage of the 1933 law which legalized pari-mutuel wagering in California. On September 14, 1946, Portland Meadows opened with over 10,000 people in attendance. Portland Meadows made history as the first thoroughbred track in the nation to offer night-time racing. This was made possible by use of a lighting system designed by General Electric which has been said has enough power "to light a four-lane superhighway from Portland to Salem, a distance of 40 miles."

In 1948, the track was closed due to the Vanport Flood. This flood destroyed the town of Vanport City, Oregon, and resulted in roughly $250,000 worth of damage to the track.

Greyhound races were held at the track in 1956 only, from August until October, after the Multnomah Kennel Club (MKC) was evicted from Civic Stadium by the impending relocation of the Portland Beavers baseball team from Vaughn Street Park. The following year, MKC moved its races to a newly built track in Wood Village, named Fairview Park.

William Wineberg owned Portland Meadows from 1962-1983. In the 1960's, Bill Wineberg offered Rick Stroud, a fixture in the horse-racing world, his first official job in racing at Portland Meadows. Rick Stroud had grown up in the world of horse racing with his father, Len Stroud, a jockey who is credited with organizing both the Canadian and American Jockey Guilds.

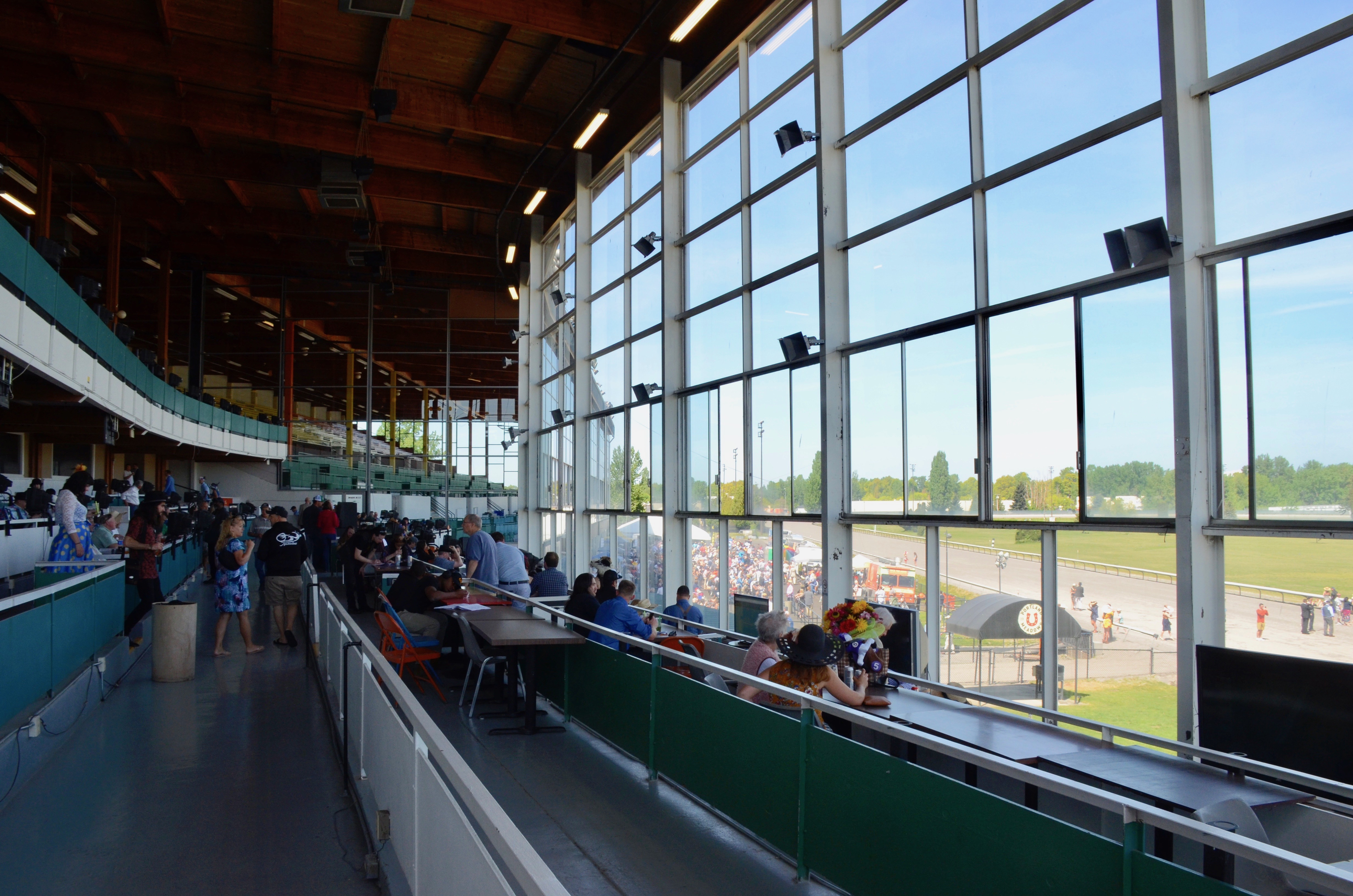
Interior of upper levels

On April 25, 1970, a fire burned the grandstand to the ground. Fortunately the blaze took no lives, human or equine, but it did end the meet. In 1971, the facilities were rebuilt and the track reopened to a record crowd of 12,635.

In 1981, Gary Stevens began a two-season streak as the leading rider at Portland Meadows. In 1987, the Coors Portland Meadows Mile became the first $100,000-stakes race in Oregon history. Present Value, a horse ridden by Hall of Fame jockey William Shoemaker, won the race. In 1994, two-year-old champion Jumron began to draw fans from across the Pacific Northwest. He went on to become the first horse to begin his career at Portland Meadows that raced in the Kentucky Derby.

Bob Dylan performed a concert at Portland Meadows on June 16, 2000 as part of his "Never Ending Tour".

In 2016, a licensed casino-style poker club, Portland Meadows Poker, was opened near the indoor stands. Patrons paid a small fee to buy into live poker tournaments and small to medium stakes un-raked cash games.

Portland Meadows closed in 2019, and the main building was demolished in February 2020.

In 2021, Amazon opened a delivery station in the parking lot of the track.

== Magna ownership ==
In 2001, Magna Entertainment acquired the racing license for Portland Meadows. Prior to the 2001–2002 meet, the racing surface was completely renovated. The Clubhouse level and Turf Club Restaurant were also refurbished and a new simulcast center was opened on the mainline level. In 2003, Portland Meadows undergoes a series of improvements including the construction of a children's play area, upgrades in the paddock, gallons upon gallons of new paint throughout the building, new fencing and the inclusion of a grass apron. Among additional changes of significance are the live race days and an increase in handle. Since dropping Sunday racing and adding Monday matinees, there's been an increase of over 100 new simulcast outlets taking the Portland Meadows signal.

In 2003, with the inception of Monday afternoon racing, it was on December 22, Portland Meadows boasted a handle in excess of half a million dollars for the first time in over 10 years. With that, the attention, interest and handle continue to rise. In 2004, Chris Dragone takes the helm as the new general manager. In 2006, Dwayne Yuzik is named general manager of Portland Meadows; Chris Dragone takes over as senior vice president and general manager of the Maryland Jockey Club. On March 6, 2007, Joe Crispin breaks Gary Stevens 25-year-old record for wins in a single season when he boots home his 127th winner of the year aboard Lady Boswell. Crispin finished the season with 162 victories. On November 5, 2007, Lethal Grande, the all-time richest Oregon-bred runner died due to an injury sustained during a race. He finished his career with $409,788 in career earnings. On January 7, 2009, Portland Meadows celebrated the start of Wednesday racing with the first ever Portland Meadows vs. Golden Gate Fields Jockey Challenge sponsored by Xpressbet. The challenge pitted the top four riders at Portland Meadows versus the top four riders from Golden Gate Fields including horse racing's all-time winningest rider Russell Baze. Portland Meadows jockeys took home the trophy winning three of the four races with that season's leading jockey Debbie Hoonan-Trujillo taking home the top riding honor. on February 29, 2009, Portland Meadows set an all-time single day handle record with $1,434,445 bet on the nine race program that included the Portland Meadows Oaks. March 23, 2009 on Portland Mile Day, the track saw two long time track records fall as Salt Water broke a 32-year-old track record winning a five furlong allowance race in 57.13 seconds. Later that day in the Mile, Crafty Power broke a 33-year-old record for the one mile distance stopping the clock in 1:35.94.

On January 13, 2010, Trainer Jonathan Nance set a new Portland Meadows record when he sent out six winners in one card. On May 1, 2010, Portland Meadows played host to a massive crowd of over 20,000 for Oregon Derby Day and Kentucky Derby Day. Portland Meadows presented a check for $10,265 to the Oregon National Guard Emergency Relief Fund on behalf of the People's Horse for 2010 Maria Margarita, who earned that amount with 3 victories and 8 in the money finishes.

The Stronach Group acquired all of MI Developments racing and gaming assets and assumed ownership of Portland Meadows on July 3, 2011.

Trainer Felimon Alvarado clinched a perfect week on October 26, 2011, winning with all six of his starters.

== See also ==
- List of sports venues in Portland, Oregon
