= Canyonville, Oregon =

- City
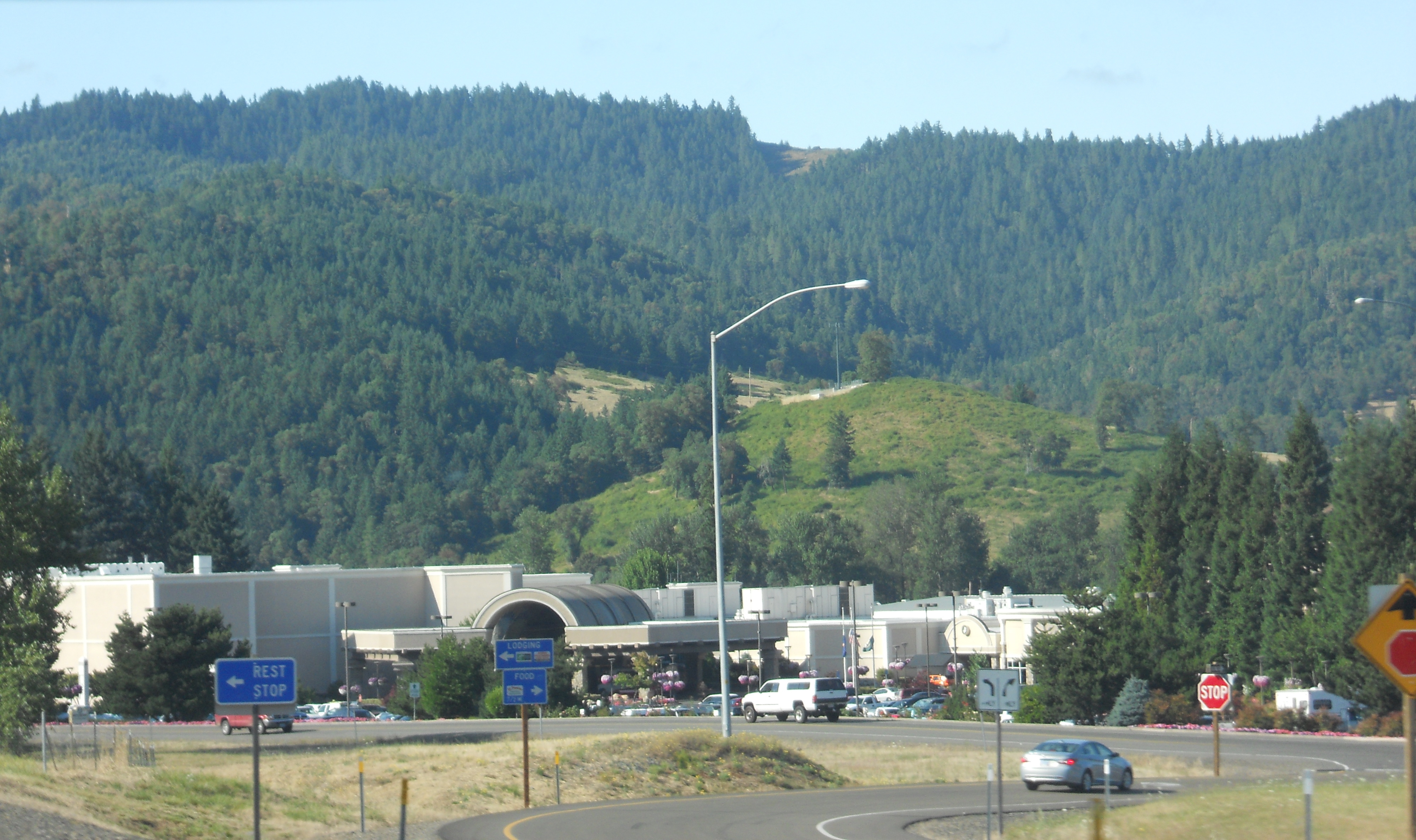

- Location in Oregon
- Coordinates: 42°55′38″N 123°16′44″W
- Country: United States
- State: Oregon
- County: Douglas
- Incorporated: 1901

Area
  - Total: 1.06 sq mi (2.75 km^{2})
  - Land: 1.06 sq mi (2.75 km^{2})
  - Water: 0 sq mi (0.00 km^{2})
- Elevation: 745 ft (227 m)

Population (2020)
  - Total: 1,640
  - Density: 1,542.5/sq mi (595.56/km^{2})
- Time zone: UTC-8 (Pacific)
  - Summer (DST): UTC-7 (Pacific)
- ZIP code: 97417
- Area code: 541
- FIPS code: 41-11000
- GNIS feature ID: 2409980
- Website: www.cityofcanyonville.com

Canyonville is a city in Douglas County, Oregon, United States. As of the 2020 census, Canyonville had a population of 1,640. The main regional tourist attraction, the Seven Feathers Casino Resort is in Canyonville. The Weaver-Worthington Farmstead, a National Historical Landmark, is located near Canyonville.

== Geography ==
The city lies along Interstate 5 about 100 miles (160 km) north of the Oregon–California border and about 200 miles (320 km) south of Portland, Oregon. Canyon Creek flows through Canyonville, where it joins the South Umpqua River.

According to the United States Census Bureau, the city has a total area of 0.97 square miles (2.51 km^{2}), all of it land.

=== Climate ===
Canyonville is classified as having a Mediterranean climate (Köppen: Csb), with some characteristics of an oceanic climate (Cfb) due to its cool temperatures. Winters are cool, gray and rainy, while summers are warm and dry.

Climate data for Canyonville, OR
Month	Jan	Feb	Mar	Apr	May	Jun	Jul	Aug	Sep	Oct	Nov	Dec	Year
Record high °F (°C)	73 (23)	80 (27)	86 (30)	93 (34)	106 (41)	113 (45)	108 (42)	110 (43)	108 (42)	102 (39)	81 (27)	74 (23)	113 (45)
Mean daily maximum °F (°C)	49 (9)	54 (12)	58 (14)	63 (17)	69 (21)	76 (24)	83 (28)	84 (29)	79 (26)	68 (20)	55 (13)	48 (9)	66 (19)
Mean daily minimum °F (°C)	34 (1)	36 (2)	37 (3)	40 (4)	44 (7)	49 (9)	53 (12)	52 (11)	47 (8)	41 (5)	38 (3)	34 (1)	42 (6)
Record low °F (°C)	−3 (−19)	8 (−13)	18 (−8)	23 (−5)	26 (−3)	34 (1)	35 (2)	36 (2)	24 (−4)	17 (−8)	13 (−11)	3 (−16)	−3 (−19)
Average precipitation inches (mm)	4.70 (119)	3.86 (98)	3.51 (89)	2.42 (61)	1.56 (40)	0.86 (22)	0.38 (9.7)	0.62 (16)	1.01 (26)	2.15 (55)	5.20 (132)	5.28 (134)	31.55 (801.7)
Average snowfall inches (cm)	2.90 (7.4)	1.00 (2.5)	0.50 (1.3)	0 (0)	0 (0)	0 (0)	0 (0)	0 (0)	0 (0)	0 (0)	0.50 (1.3)	1.70 (4.3)	6.60 (16.8)
Source: http://www.intellicast.com/Local/History.aspx?location=USOR0055

== Demographics ==
Historical population
Census	Pop.	Note	%±
1910	149		—
1920	156		4.7%
1930	167		7.1%
1940	255		52.7%
1950	861		237.6%
1960	1,089		26.5%
1970	940		−13.7%
1980	1,288		37.0%
1990	1,219		−5.4%
2000	1,293		6.1%
2010	1,884		45.7%
2020	1,640		−13.0%
U.S. Decennial Census

=== 2020 census ===
As of the 2020 census, Canyonville had a population of 1,640. The median age was 53.7 years. 17.4% of residents were under the age of 18 and 34.8% of residents were 65 years of age or older. For every 100 females there were 99.5 males, and for every 100 females age 18 and over there were 96.5 males age 18 and over.

0% of residents lived in urban areas, while 100.0% lived in rural areas.

There were 690 households in Canyonville, of which 21.2% had children under the age of 18 living in them. Of all households, 41.9% were married-couple households, 22.5% were households with a male householder and no spouse or partner present, and 28.3% were households with a female householder and no spouse or partner present. About 33.2% of all households were made up of individuals and 20.1% had someone living alone who was 65 years of age or older.

There were 790 housing units, of which 12.7% were vacant. Among occupied housing units, 61.3% were owner-occupied and 38.7% were renter-occupied. The homeowner vacancy rate was 4.0% and the rental vacancy rate was 9.9%.

Racial composition as of the 2020 census
Race	Number	Percent
White	1,343	81.9%
Black or African American	21	1.3%
American Indian and Alaska Native	48	2.9%
Asian	65	4.0%
Native Hawaiian and Other Pacific Islander	3	0.2%
Some other race	51	3.1%
Two or more races	109	6.6%
Hispanic or Latino (of any race)	117	7.1%

=== 2010 census ===
According to the census of 2010, there were 1,884 people, 756 households, and 470 families living in the city. The population density was 1,942.3 inhabitants per square mile (749.9/km^{2}). There were 820 housing units at an average density of 845.4 per square mile (326.4/km^{2}). The racial makeup of the city was 86.3% White, 0.4% African American, 2.7% Native American, 4.6% Asian, 1.6% from other races, and 4.5% of two or more races. Hispanic or Latino of any race were 5.5% of the population.

Of the 756 households, 24.6% had children under the age of 18 living with them; 45.5% were married couples living together; 12.2% had a female householder with no husband present; 4.5% had a male householder with no wife present; and 37.8% were non-families. 31.3% of all households were individuals, and in 16.5% there was someone living alone who was 65 years of age or older. The average household size was 2.4, and the average family size was 2.79.

The city's median age was 46.5 years. 22.8% of residents were under the age of 18; 8.3% were between the ages of 18 and 24; 17.4% were from 25 to 44; 25.2% were from 45 to 64; and 26.4% were 65 years of age or older. The city's gender makeup was 49.5% male and 50.5% female.

=== 2000 census ===
As of the census of 2000, there were 1,293 people, 534 households, and 341 families living in the city. The population density was 1,411.6 people per square mile. There were 580 housing units at an average density of 633.2 per square mile. The racial makeup of the city was 91.88% White, 0.15% African American, 3.40% Native American, 0.85% Asian, 0.23% Pacific Islander, 0.54% from other races, and 2.94% from two or more races. Hispanic or Latino of any race were 3.17% of the population.

There were 534 households, out of which 25.3% had children under the age of 18 living with them, 49.6% were married couples living together, 10.1% had a female householder with no husband present, and 36.0% were non-families. 30.0% of all households were made up of individuals, and 15.7% had someone living alone who was 65 years of age or older. The average household size was 2.41 and the average family size was 2.97.

In the city, the population was spread out, with 24.1% under the age of 18, 7.8% from 18 to 24, 22.3% from 25 to 44, 25.7% from 45 to 64, and 20.2% who were 65 years of age or older. The median age was 42 years. For every 100 females, there were 92.7 males. For every 100 females age 18 and over, there were 89.6 males.

The median income for a household in the city was $27,674, and the median income for a family was $31,500. Males had a median income of $30,240 versus $17,417 for females. The per capita income for the city was $14,017. About 15.8% of families and 17.0% of the population were below the poverty line, including 15.4% of those under age 18 and 19.0% of those age 65 or over.
