= Fantasy Sports Writers Association =

Organization representing U.S. journalists who cover fantasy sports

FSWA logo

The Fantasy Sports Writers Association (FSWA) is an organization that represents journalists in the United States who cover fantasy sports. It was founded in 2004. According to its website, the organization's mission is to "be a voice for writers in the arena of fantasy sports... [and] strive to promote and acknowledge the hard work and dedication shown by fantasy sports writers throughout the industry." Andy Behrens serves as the President of the FSWA.

== History ==
The association was founded in 2004. Ryan Houston was the first president, succeeded by Kirk Bouyelas in 2006, Mike Beacom in 2008, and Andy Behrens in 2014. Near the end of each calendar year, nominations are made through a blind process. A group of judges with teaching backgrounds and a familiarity with fantasy sports narrows down the submissions to a group of typically 3-5 finalists. A second group of judges then chooses the best submission in each category. The finalist is typically announced in January, with winners announced about a month later. In order to garner more of an audience for the industry awards, the last few have been broadcast live on SiriusXM radio's Fantasy Sports channel.

== Writing Awards ==
The Fantasy Sports Writers Association has been providing awards since 2004 to honor the industry's best writers. The awards are typically presented each January at a meeting of the organization in Las Vegas. Many of the winners come from sites and publications dedicated to fantasy sports, while others come from general-purpose sports publications.

== Past winners ==
2017 Award Winners		
Football Awards	Baseball Awards	Other Awards
Writer of the Year - Gary Davenport, Fantasy Sharks	Writer of the Year - Todd Zola, Mastersball	Humor Article of the Year - Sammie Reid, Rotogrinders
Best Article on the Web - Jeff Ratcliffe, Pro Football Focus	Best Article on the Net - Jim Sannes, numberFire	Racing Writer of the Year - Mark Taylor, Rotowire
Best Article in Print - Jamey Eisenberg, CBS	Best Article in Print - Tim McCullough, FantasyPros	Golf Writer of the Year - Adam Daly-Frey, Fantasy Golf Insider
Best On-Going Series - Tyler Loechner, Pro Football Focus	Best On-Going Series - Scott Engel, RotoExperts	Basketball Writer of the Year - Benny Ricciardi, GuruElite
Best Publication - Football Diehards	Best Publication - RotoWire	College Writer of the Year - Brad Evans, Yahoo
Podcast of the Year - The Fantasy Footballers	Podcast of the Year - USA Today	Podcast of the Year (All Sports) - Rotowire
		Hockey Writer of the Year - Doug Shain, Bankster DFS
		Soccer Writer of the Year - Andrew Laird, RotoWire
		Newcomer of the Year - James McCool, DraftKings
		Video of the Year - Yahoo Fantasy Football Live
		Radio Show of the Year - Pro Football Focus - Jeff Ratcliffe

2016 Award Winners
Football Awards	Baseball Awards	Other Awards
Writer of the Year - Jeff Zimmerman, Rotowire	Writer of the Year - Ray Murphy, Baseball HQ	Humor Article of the Year - Chris Mitchell, RotoExperts
Best Article on the Net - Drew Loftis, New York Post	Best Article on the Net - Michael Rathburn, Rotowire	Racing Writer of the Year - Mark Taylor, Rotowire
Best Article in Print - Jeff Zimmerman, Rotowire	Best Article in Print - Rob Leibowitz, RotoHeaven	Golf Writer of the Year - Michael Riek, Rotowire
Best Series - Brandon Murchison, RotoExperts	Best Series - Ray Flowers, Fantasy Alarm	Basketball Writer of the Year - Ryan Knaus, Rotoworld
Best Publication - Football Diehards	Best Publication - Rotoworld	College Writer of the Year - John McKechnie, Rotowire
Podcast of the Year - Draft Sharks	Podcast of the Year - USA Today	Podcast of the Year (All Sports) - Rotowire
		Hockey Writer of the Year - James Capone, Scout
		Newcomer of the Year - Juan Carlos Blanco, Rotowire
		Video of the Year - Yahoo Fantasy Football Live
		Radio Show of the Year - Pro Football Focus - Jeff Ratcliffe

2015 Award Winners		
Football Awards	Baseball Awards	Other Awards
Writer of the Year - Brad Evans, Yahoo	Writer of the Year - Mike Podhorzer, Fangraphs	Humor Article of the Year - Chris Liss, Rotowire
Best Article on the Net - JJ Zachariason, Numberfire	Best Article on the Net - Ryan Bloomfield, Baseball HQ	Racing Writer of the Year - CJ Radune, Rotowire
Best Article in Print - Gary Davenport, Fantasy Sharks	Best Article in Print - Dave Regan, Rotowire	Golf Writer of the Year - Jeff Bergerson, Fantasy Golf Insider
Best Series - Robert McMann, RotoExperts	Best Series - Logan Hitchcock, Daily Roto	Basketball Writer of the Year - Ryan Knaus, Rotoworld
Best Publication - USA Today Sports: Fantasy Football	Best Publication - Ron Shandler's Baseball Forecaster	College Writer of the Year - Christopher Feery, Footballguys
		Hockey Writer of the Year - Andrew Fiorentino, Rotowire
		Newcomer of the Year - Alex Chamberlain, Fangraphs
		Video of the Year - Pat Mayo, FNTSY
		Podcast of the Year - Christopher Harris, HarrisFootball
		Radio Show of the Year - Jeff Mans and Tommy G on SiriusXM

2014 Award Winners
Football Awards	Baseball Awards	Other Awards
Writer of the Year - Steve Schwarz, The Sports Network	Writer of the Year - Michael Rathburn, Rotowire	Humor Article of the Year - Ken Crites, Rotowire
Best Article on the Net - Walter Collazo, Fantasy Sharks	Best Article on the Net - Benny Ricciardi, DFS Report	Racing Writer of the Year - Eric McClung, FF Toolbox
Best Article in Print - Matt Lutovsky, Sporting News	Best Article in Print - Steve Gardner, USA Today	Golf Writer of the Year - Gibb Pollard, RotoGrinders
Best Series - Evan Silva, Rotoworld	Best Series - Jeff Zimmerman, FanGraphs	Basketball Writer of the Year - Aaron Bruski, Rotoworld
Best Publication - USA Today Sports: Fantasy Football 2014	Best Publication - USA Today Sports: Fantasy Baseball 2014	College Writer of the Year - Brad Evans, Yahoo!
		Hockey Writer of the Year - Jesse Pantuosco, The Sports Network
		Newcomer of the Year - Dan Ciarrocchi, SB Nation
		Video of the Year - Yahoo Fantasy Football Live
		Podcast of the Year - Dan Back, RotoGrinders Daily Fantasy Fix
		Radio Show of the Year - RotoExperts on SiriusXM

2013 Award Winners
Football Awards	Baseball Awards	Other Awards
Writer of the Year - Dave Richard, CBS	Writer of the Year - Jason Collette, Rotowire	Humor Article of the Year - Thomas McFeeley, RotoExperts
Best Article on the Net - Mike Clay, Pro Football Focus	Best Article on the Net - Todd Zola, ESPN	Racing Writer of the Year - Daniel Dobish, RotoExperts
Best Article in Print - Alessandro Miglio, Pro Football Focus	Best Article in Print - David Martin, Baseball HQ	Golf Writer of the Year - Greg Vara, Rotowire
Best Series - Salvatore Stefanile, XN Sports	Best Series - Erik Siegrist, Rotowire	Basketball Writer of the Year - Jesse Pantuosco, The Sports Network
Best Publication - Fantasy Football ProForecast	Best Publication - Rotoworld	College Writer of the Year - Brad Evans, Yahoo!
		Hockey Writer of the Year - Jesse Pantuosco, The Sports Network
		Newcomer of the Year - Pat Thorman, Pro Football Focus
		Video of the Year - CBS, Fantasy Baseball Today, Adam Aizer, Scott White, Nando Di Fino and Al Melchior
		Podcast of the Year - Patrick Davitt, Baseball HQ Radio
		Radio Show of the Year - Rotowire Fantasy Sports Today, Jeff Erickson, Chris Liss, Derek VanRiper, Andrew Martinez and Jason Thornbury

2012 Award Winners
Football Awards	Baseball Awards	Other Awards
Writer of the Year - Brad Evans, Yahoo! Sports	Writer of the Year - Alex Beckey, Baseball HQ	Humor Article of the Year - Matt Lutovsky, The Sporting News
Best Article on the Net - Alessandro Miglio, Pro Football Focus	Best Article on the Net - Jack Moore, RotoWire	Racing Writer of the Year - C.J. Radune, RotoWire
Best Article in Print - Allie Fontana, Football Diehards	Best Article in Print - Matt Lutovsky	Golf Writer of the Year - Daniel Dobish, RotoExperts
Best Series - Patrick Mayo, RotoExperts	Best Series - Patrick DiCaprio, USA Today	Basketball Writer of the Year - Brian McKitish, ESPN
Best Publication - Sports Illustrated	Best Publication - The Sporting News	College Writer of the Year - Jesse Siegel, RotoWire
		Hockey Writer of the Year - Janet Eagleson, RotoWire
		Newcomer of the Year - Scott Spratt, Pro Football Focus

2011 Award Winners
Football Awards	Baseball Awards	Other Awards
Writer of the Year - Ladd Biro	Writer of the Year - Chris Ryan, RotoExperts	Humor Article of the Year - Ladd Biro
Best Article on the Net - Jeff Paur, RealTime	Best Article on the Net - Tristan Cockcroft, ESPN	Racing Writer of the Year - Daniel Dobish, RotoExperts
Best Article in Print - Jeff Stotts, RotoWire	Best Article in Print - David Regan, RotoWire	Golf Writer of the Year - Daniel Dobish, RotoExperts
Best Series - Adam Levitan, Rotoworld	Best Series - Ray Flowers, Baseball Guys/RotoWire	Basketball Writer of the Year - Carson Cistulli, RotoWire
Best Publication - Sports Illustrated	Best Publication - The Sporting News	College Writer of the Year - Brad Evans, Yahoo! Sports
		Hockey Writer of the Year - Mark McLarney, RotoWire
		Newcomer of the Year - Mark Bloom, RotoExperts

2010 Award Winners
Football Awards	Baseball Awards	Other Awards
Writer of the Year - Ladd Biro	Writer of the Year - David Regan, RotoWire	Humor Article of the Year - Chris Ryan, RotoExperts
Best Article on the Net - Tim McCullough	Best Article on the Net - Derek VanRiper, RotoWire	Racing Writer of the Year - Mark Taylor, RotoWire
Best Article in Print - Cory Bonini, KFFL	Best Article in Print - Chris Liss, RotoWire	Golf Writer of the Year - John McNamara, RotoWire
Best Series - Ryan Bonini, KFFL	Best Series - David Regan, RotoWire	Basketball Writer of the Year - Brian McKitish, ESPN
Best Publication - Football CheatSheets	Best Publication - The Sporting News	College Writer of the Year - Brad Evans, Yahoo! Sports
		Hockey Writer of the Year - Janet Eagleson
		Newcomer of the Year - Lane Rizzardini

2009 Award Winners
Football Awards	Baseball Awards	Other Awards
Writer of the Year - Ryan Bonini, KFFL	Writer of the Year - Scott White, CBSSports.com	Humor Article of the Year - Mike Gilbert, RotoExperts
Best Article on the Net - Derek VanRiper, RotoWire	Best Article on the Net - David Regan, RotoWire	Racing Writer of the Year - Mark Taylor, RotoWire
Best Article in Print - Ted Carlson, Fanball	Best Article in Print - Brent Hershey, USA Today Sports Weekly	Golf Writer of the Year - Scott Pianowski, Yahoo! Sports
Best Series - Adam Levitan, Rotoworld	Best Series - David Regan, RotoWire	Basketball Writer of the Year - Andre Snellings, RotoWire
Best Publication - Pro Football Weekly / Yahoo! Sports	Best Publication - RotoWire	College Writer of the Year - Brad Evans, Yahoo! Sports
		Hockey Writer of the Year - Sean Allen, ESPN

2008 Award Winners
Football Awards	Baseball Awards	Other Awards
Writer of the Year - Jay Clemons, Sports Illustrated	Writer of the Year - Jeff Erickson, RotoWire	Humor Article of the Year - Jeremy Fisher, Fantasy Football Trader
Best Article on the Net - Chris Liss, RotoWire	Best Article on the Net - Eno Sarris, Baseball Guys	Racing Writer of the Year - Mark Taylor, RotoWire
Best Article in Print - Dan Grogan, Athlon	Best Article in Print - Andy Behrens, Yahoo	Golf Writer of the Year - John McNamara, RotoWire
Best Major Media Article - Dave Richard, CBS Sports	Best Major Media Article - Matt Lutovsky, Sporting News	Hockey Writer of the Year - Sean Allen, ESPN
Best Series - George Winkler, Sporting News	Best Series - Scott White, CBS Sports	Basketball Writer of the Year - Sergio Gonzalez, CBS Sports
Best Publication - Rotoworld	Best Publication - RotoWire	College Writer of the Year - Adam Mankuta, RotoWire

2007 Award Winners
Football Awards	Baseball Awards	Other Awards
Writer of the Year - Gregg Rosenthal	Writer of the Year - Jeff Erickson	Humor Article of the Year - John Paulson
Best Article on the Net - Jason Powell	Best Article on the Net - Peter Becker	Racing Writer of the Year - Christopher Harris
Best Article in Print - Joe Levit	Best Article in Print - Will Carroll	Golf Writer of the Year - Ross Devonport
Best Major Media Article - Vinny Iyer	Best Major Media Article - Christopher Harris	Hockey Writer of the Year - Janet Eagleson
Best Series - John Rakowski	Best Series - Eric Karabell	Basketball Writer of the Year - Andre' Snellings
Best Publication - RotoWire	Best Publication - RotoWire	

2006 Award Winners
Football Awards	Baseball Awards	Other Awards
Writer of the Year - Scott Engel	Writer of the Year - Brendan Roberts	Racing Writer of the Year - Christopher Harris
Best Article on the Net - Matthew Berry	Best Article on the Net - Peter Schoenke	Golf Writer of the Year - Scott Coombs
Best Article in Print - Kirk Bouyelas	Best Article in Print - William Carroll	Hockey Writer of the Year - Janet Eagleson
Most Humorous Article - Garett Matheny	Most Humorous Article - Matthew Berry	Basketball Writer of the Year - Matthew Berry
Best Major Media Article - Christopher Harris	Best Major Media Article - Matthew Berry	
Best Series - John Georgopoulos	Best Series - Brendan Roberts	

2005 Award Winners
Football Awards	Baseball Awards	Other Awards
Writer of the Year - Eric Karabell	Writer of the Year - Trace Wood	Racing Writer of the Year - Christopher Harris
Best Article on the Net - Lenny Pappano	Best Article on the Net - Brian McKitish	Golf Writer of the Year - Greg Vara
Best Article in Print - Micheal Fabiano	Best Article in Print - William Carroll	
Most Humorous Article - John Nemo	Most Humorous Article - Matthew Berry	
Best Major Media Article - Ken Daube	Best Magazine Advertising Campaign - RotoWire	
Best Series - Michael Fabiano

2004 Award Winners
Football Awards
Writer of the Year - Bob Harris
Best Article on the Net - Tristan Cockcroft
Best Article in Print - Sam Caplan
Most Humorous Article - JK Rupprecht
Best Major Media Article - Matt Watson
Best Series - Greg Kellogg

Several members of the industry have been nominated for and won multiple awards. The leaders - by individual and media outlet - are listed below:

All-Time Most Wins - Individual
Wins	Writer(s)
9	Brad Evans
6	Christopher Harris, David Regan
5	Matthew Berry, Mark Taylor
4	Daniel Dobish, Janet Eagleson, Matt Lutovsky, Chris Liss
3	Will Carroll, Brian McKitish, Ladd Biro, Jesse Pantuosco, Derek VanRiper, Jeff Erickson, Jeff Zimmerman, Jeff Ratcliffe

All-Time Most Wins - Media Outlet
Wins	Outlet(s)
61	Rotowire
16	RotoExperts
14	ESPN, Yahoo
12	Sporting News
11	Rotoworld
10	CBS
9	ProFootballFocus
8	TalentedMrRoto, USA Today
5	Baseball HQ

All-Time Most Nominations - Individual
Nominations	Writer(s)
15	Brad Evans
14	David Regan
13	Chris Liss, Chris Harris
11	Tristan Cockcroft, Patrick Mayo
9	Matthew Berry, Andy Behrens, John Georgopoulos, Ladd Biro, Daniel Dobish, Scott Engel
8	Heather Cocks, Matt Lutovsky, Jeff Erickson, Mark Taylor
7	Janet Eagleson, Alessandro Miglio, Jeff Zimmerman, Jeff Ratcliffe, Derek Van Riper, Scott Pianowski
6	Ray Flowers, Scott White, Greg Vara, Mike Rathburn, JJ Zachariason

All-Time Most Nominations - Media Outlet
Nominations	Outlet(s)
190	Rotowire
70	RotoExperts
42	ESPN
38	TalentedMrRoto, Sporting News
36	Yahoo Sports
29	CBS
24	Rotoworld
23	Pro Football Focus
21	RotoGrinders
15	Sports Grumblings
14	Football Diehards
11	Baseball HQ, USA Today
9	KFFL, Fangraphs, numberFire
8	Sports Illustrated, Fanball

== Hall of Fame ==
In 2010, the FSWA established a Hall of Fame to honor fantasy sports writers, publishers, and editors "who possess a distinguished body of work and/or those who have helped to advance the careers of others in the fantasy sports industry."

The classes of writers inducted into the Hall of Fame are below.

Class of 2010
Greg Ambrosius
Matthew Berry
Scott Engel
Eric Karabell
Greg Kellogg

Class of 2011
David Dodds
Brandon Funston
Emil Kadlec
Nate Ravitz
Peter Schoenke
Ron Shandler

Class of 2012
Ryan R. Bonini
Tristan H. Cockcroft
William Del Pilar
Michael Fabiano
Dan Grogan
Bob Harris
James Quintong

Class of 2013
Glenn Waggoner
John Hansen

Class of 2014
John Hunt
Matthew Pouilot
Jeff Erickson

Class of 2015
Joe Bryant
Jason Grey
Alex Patton

Class of 2016
Peter Kreutzer
Lenny Melnick
Ian Allan
