= Fantasy Focus (podcast) =

Fantasy sports podcast

- Genre: Sports talk Comedy
- Running time: ~1 hour
- Country of origin: (United States) USA
- Home station: ESPN (2007-)
- Starring: Stephania Bell; Matthew Berry; Eric Karabell; Field Yates; Tristan H. Cockcroft; Doug Kezirian; John Cregan; Tom Carpenter
- Original release: 2007 – present

Fantasy Focus is a sports talk podcast devoted to fantasy sports. The show is available on iTunes, and ESPN Podcenter. The baseball show is hosted by Eric Karabell and Tristan Cockcroft, along with producer Daniel Dopp and injury analyst Stephania Bell. The football show is hosted by Field Yates, along with Bell, Dopp and Kyle Soppe. Matthew Berry hosted until 2022 when he took a position with NBC Sports. Nate Ravitz hosted until 2014, when he took on an internal position at ESPN, and was replaced by Yates. The basketball show was hosted by Doug Kezirian, John Cregan and Tom Carpenter until its completion.

The Fantasy Focus Football podcast is ESPN's most downloaded original-content podcast (and second overall behind only the podcast version of Pardon the Interruption). It consistently ranks among the top ten podcasts on iTunes and in August 2009, was the #1 audio podcast on all of iTunes. The show has won a total of five awards from PodcastAwards.com, including "Best Sports Podcast" in 2009, 2011, and 2012, and the overall "People's Choice" podcast in 2009 and 2012.

== Segments ==
=== The Name Game ===
"The Name Game" is a rapid-fire question and answer segment, in which two players' values are compared against each other, with one ultimately being deemed the better choice based upon the fantasy league being discussed. The players discussed are often requested by listeners of the show, who submit their questions via email.

=== The Board ===
Ravitz, Berry, Karabell and Cockcroft make contradicting predictions on many zany issues, including how players will fare in an upcoming fantasy season, single week performance, and pop culture issues. These predictions are tracked "on the board", with the winner being the host who has the most accurate predictions at the end of the season.

=== Cousin of the Podcast ===
Prior to taking over as co-host of the Fantasy Focus Baseball Podcast from Matthew Berry and Nate Ravitz Cockcroft was a frequent contributor. So much so that he earned the nickname "Cousin of the Podcast." Often taking the role of analyst alongside Ravitz, Cockcroft's fondness to calling player "streaky" was made famous by an oft-used drop on the show.

=== And Sometimes Karabell and Cockcroft ===
In 2013, Karabell and Cockcroft took over as co-hosts of the Friday edition of Fantasy Focus Baseball Podcasts. The change led Podcast theme songwriter Eric Hutchinson to produce a modified version of the theme song to be played on days when Cockcroft and Karabell hosted the show.

=== Co-Host of Fantasy Focus Baseball Podcast ===
On January 28, 2014 the era of Cockcroft and Karabell as full-time hosts of the Fantasy Focus Baseball Podcast began.

=== Football Today Rivalry ===
Soderberg commonly stated that he preferred producing the other ESPN podcast ESPN Football Today. Many hours of banter were created from this topic.

=== League Formerly Known as the Man's League ===
Cockcroft and Karabell are hosts of "The Man's League," a fantasy baseball league in which the listeners of the show play against Cockcroft, Karabell, and the show's producer, Jay Soderberg (aka Pod Vader). The "Man's League" was originally named as such due to the high number of team owners the league has, requiring participants to be knowledgeable of lesser known professional baseball players to be competitive. As of March 7, 2014, Cockcroft and Karabell have yet to officially announce the name of the league formerly known as the Man's League. However, they have indicated that admission to said league will be determined by Cockcroft, Karabell, and Soderberg on the simple basis of whether a listener's email can impress them.

=== Geeky Stat of the Day ===
One addition to the show brought by Cockcroft in the 2014 season is the Geeky Stat of the Day. During this segment of the show Cockcroft delivers an arcane stat that he expects will be useful to listeners as they evaluate their own fantasy teams.

=== Daniel's Hashbrowns ===
After Eric Karabell misspoke the term "hashtag", the gag was continued into an ongoing segment. The segment contains content similar to the mailbag's email segment, but by Twitter instead.
