= Pappano =

Pappano is a surname. Notable people with the surname include:

- Antonio Pappano (born 1959), English-Italian conductor and pianist
- Lenny Pappano (born 1964), American fantasy sports writer
