= SportsNation =

SportsNation may refer to:

- SportsNation (website), an interactive sports debate and polling site on ESPN.com
- SportsNation (TV series), a daily ESPN2 television series
- SB Nation, short for "Sports Blog Nation", a website and YouTube channel managed by Vox Media
