= You're with me, leather =

Popular sports phrase and inside joke

"You're with me, leather" or YWML as it is also known, is a phrase popular with sports website Deadspin, its readers and fellow sports bloggers, and has grown into an Internet phenomenon. The phrase gained widespread popularity after an anecdote was submitted to Deadspin on April 11, 2006, describing the use of the phrase as a pick-up line by ESPN anchor Chris Berman.

"You're with me, ____," with other words or phrases inserted in place of "leather," is often repeated in response to news stories involving Berman. The phrase is also often used without context as a non sequitur, snowclone or an inside joke.

== Origin ==
In a post by Deadspin assistant editor Rick Chandler, a source (whom site editor Will Leitch called "a respected journalist") claimed that in the mid-1990s, a friend of his was flirting in a bar with an attractive woman wearing leather pants and holding a leather jacket. However, his efforts proved unsuccessful when Berman, who was in Scottsdale, Arizona to cover baseball spring training, walked by and told the woman "You're with me, leather." The woman immediately got up and left the bar with Berman.

During the 2006 NFL draft, fan Aaron Ghitelman asked Berman whether he had ever visited Deadspin. Berman reportedly told the fan, "Why would I go and do that? That is such a stupid question. What are you, stupid? That is so stupid."

In 2007, Berman said of the phrase and its popularity, "A lot of people are very mean-spirited, apparently. You're talking about something that happened nine years ago, some people want to dump on a guy that's been pretty nice to people for 27 years."

== Reference in mass media ==
=== References by current and former ESPN personalities ===
- Tony Kornheiser (former Monday Night Football announcer) on WTEM Tony Kornheiser Radio Show: joked that his touchdown call on Monday Night Football should be "You're with me, leather."
- Keith Olbermann (former SportsCenter anchor) on MSNBC Countdown with Keith Olbermann: "Then again who am I to get into a semantics argument with a guy carrying an iron war hammer and a tunic made out of animals he killed with his own teeth? You're with me, leather!"
- Neil Everett on SportsCenter: "He's with leather", describing a catch by Texas Rangers outfielder Gary Matthews, Jr.
- DJ Gallo of ESPN.com Page 2, referencing Berman's alleged outburst at the fan who asked if he had read Deadspin: "But I can't believe I got a double bogey on 18. Why would I go and do that? That is so stupid. What am I, stupid? I am so stupid." Gallo was also alluding to a quote of Phil Mickelson after the 2006 U.S. Open, in which he came to the 72nd hole with a one-shot lead over Geoff Ogilvy, but double-bogeyed the hole to hand the title to Ogilvy: "I still am in shock that I did that. I just can't believe that I did that. I am such an idiot."
- Bill Simmons of ESPN.com Page 2, in a SportsNation chat session on July 12, was asked by someone who identified themselves as Chris Berman from Bristol, CT: "You're with me, Sports Guy." Simmons responded with "(Trying to fight off 100,000 bolts of electric current)". Simmons has admitted in a non-ESPN interview that Deadspin is one of the few blogs he reads.

=== References in sports media ===
- Host John Woolard to co-host Jay Christensen of the Los Angeles Times on the Sports Overnight America radio show: Woolard after Christensen mentioned the Deadspin item on the "leather" comments attributed to Chris Berman: "I wonder if the woman was the same woman (Suzi Quatro) who played Leather Tuscadero on 'Happy Days'? Too bad 'The Fonz' wasn't there to stop it all from happening."
- Ted Miller, Seattle Post-Intelligencer: "Most gurus project the Seahawks will take a cornerback with the 31st pick, a theory that goes over well with fans who imagine a newcomer forming a ball-hawking tandem with Marcus Trufant that deadeyes spinning pigskins and exclaims: 'You're with me, leather!'"
- Tom Hoffarth, Los Angeles Daily News: "Does that mean ESPN's Chris Berman, good enough to do the Super Bowl commercial for the awful Disney remake of "The Shaggy Dog," wasn't synergetic enough to voice his own car? Is it because they couldn't come up with a catchy nickname for him? If only "Chris Airbag" could have been cast for the role, so Waltrip could have told him: 'You're with me, Leather.'"
- Dan Wetzel, Yahoo! Sports: "He is appropriately light, doesn't act like this is too important and, unlike Chris "You're with me, Leather" Berman, doesn't tip off the pick 10 seconds before it is announced with some horrible pun or play on words."
- FSN Houston: Displayed info box with the text, "Astros lead the majors with 112 double plays this season" with the title, "You're with me, leather" during a broadcast of the Houston Astros vs New York Mets game on July 23, 2006.
- NBCSports.com When an announcement came on December 11, 2006 that the NBA was switching back to a traditional basketball after the failure of a synthetic model, NBC Sports had the tagline "We're with you, Leather"
- Yahoo! Sports: Over the weekend starting June 23, 2007, a link to a video of MLB defensive highlights read, "They're with leather: MLB's Top 10 defensive plays".

=== Popular media references ===
- Damien Fahey, host of MTV Total Request Live: Cited YWML as his favorite pick-up line on the June 20, 2006 broadcast of Total Request Live and displayed the t-shirt sold by Gawker.com bearing the phrase and an obscured portrait of Berman.
- In a November 10, 2006 episode of Las Vegas, a guest star used YWML to pick up Vanessa Marcil's character at a hotel bar.
- Keith Olbermann referenced the line on the February 20, 2007 episode of Countdown in an unrelated story about the Rawlings all-time Gold Glove team.
