= Casey Wiegmann =

American football player (born 1973)

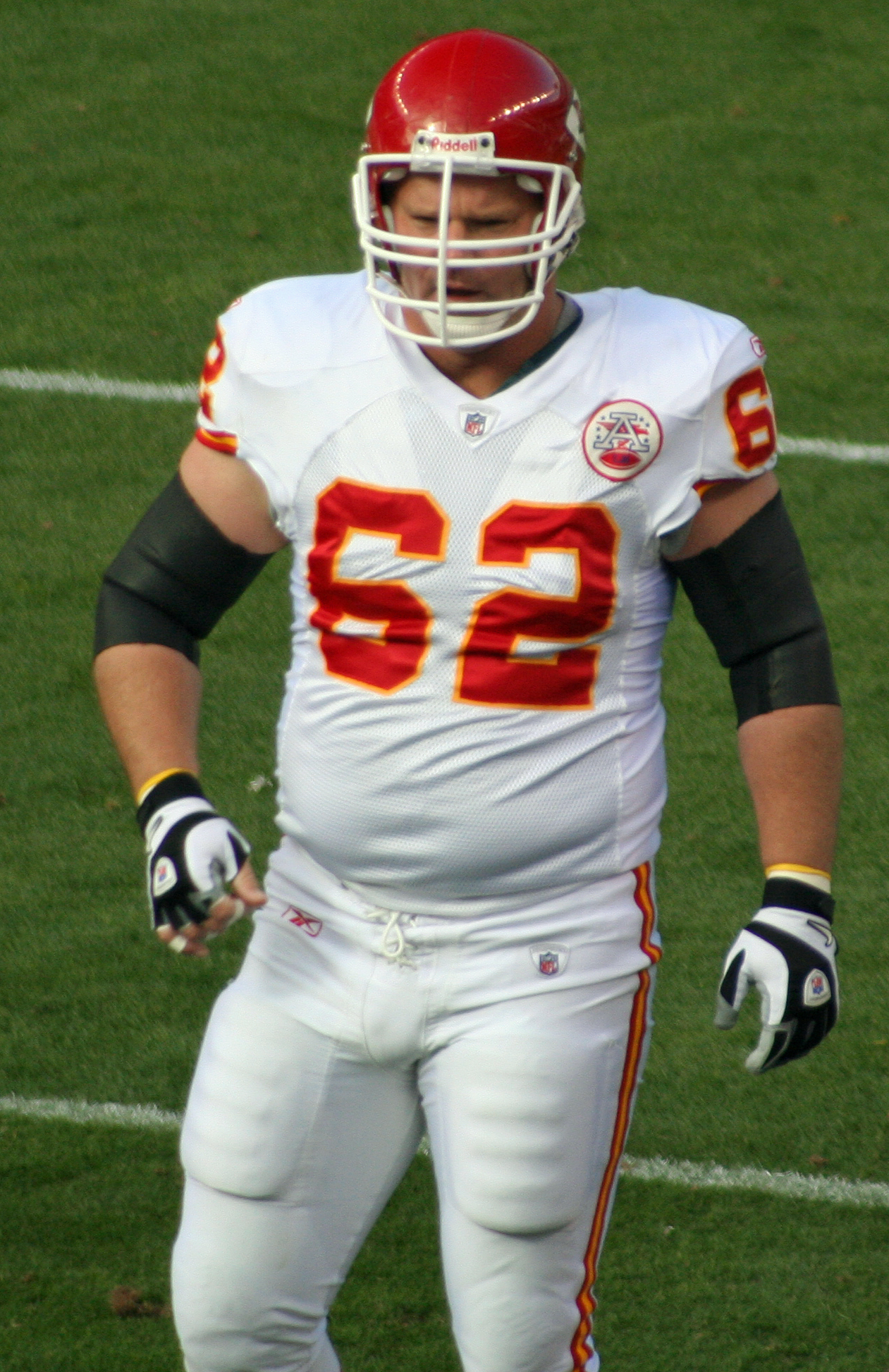
- Wiegmann with the Kansas City Chiefs in 2010

No. 60, 62
- Position: Center

Personal information
- Born: July 20, 1973 (age 53); Parkersburg, Iowa, U.S.
- Listed height: 6 ft 2 in (1.88 m)
- Listed weight: 285 lb (129 kg)

Career information
- High school: Aplington–Parkersburg
- College: Iowa
- NFL draft: 1996: undrafted

Career history
- Indianapolis Colts (1996); New York Jets (1996–1997); Chicago Bears (1997–2000); Kansas City Chiefs (2001–2007); Denver Broncos (2008–2009); Kansas City Chiefs (2010–2011)

Awards and highlights
- Pro Bowl (2008)

Career NFL statistics
- Games played: 227
- Games started: 200
- Fumble recoveries: 7
- Stats at Pro Football Reference

Casey Peter Wiegmann (born July 20, 1973) is an American former professional football player who was a center for 16 seasons in the National Football League (NFL). He played college football for the Iowa Hawkeyes. He was signed by the Indianapolis Colts as an undrafted free agent in 1996, and has also played for the New York Jets, Chicago Bears, and Denver Broncos and Kansas City Chiefs.

== College career ==
As a University of Iowa student-athlete, Wiegmann played for the Iowa Hawkeyes football team. He started every game his senior year, with a total of 27 career starts as a center for the Hawkeyes.

== Professional career ==
Wiegmann played for the New York Jets, Chicago Bears and Kansas City Chiefs before joining the Denver Broncos in 2008. He started all 16 games for the Broncos during the 2008 season. He has a 127-game starting streak, which is the longest streak among all active NFL centers. Wiegmann was part of a Broncos offensive line that tied the Tennessee Titans for the fewest sacks given up during the regular season. In January 2009, Wiegmann was chosen to play in the 2009 Pro Bowl as an alternate. He replaced an injured Kevin Mawae. The Pro Bowl selection was the first of Wiegmann's career.

Wiegmann was released by the Broncos on February 23, 2010. He was signed by the Kansas City Chiefs, his former team, on March 12, 2010. When Wiegmann retired, his consecutive snap count was more than 11,000.

== Personal life ==
Wiegmann and Kansas native Danni Boatwright of Survivor: Guatemala fame had their first child on October 8, 2007. In late May 2008, his hometown of Parkersburg, Iowa, was destroyed by an EF5 tornado. On June 19, he and Aaron Kampman appeared in Parkersburg to help the town recover.
