= Danni Boatwright =

American actress, TV host, sports journalist, model and beauty queen (born 1975)

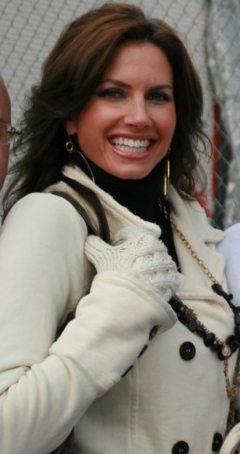
- Boatwright in 2006
- Born: Danielle E. Boatwright; July 13, 1975 (age 51); Tonganoxie, Kansas, U.S.
- Known for: Miss Kansas Teen USA 1992; (Winner); Miss Teen USA 1992; (2nd Runner-Up); Miss Kansas USA 1996; (Winner); Miss USA 1996; (1st Runner-Up)
- Television: Survivor: Guatemala (Winner); Survivor: Winners at War; 99 to Beat
- Spouse(s): Wade Hayes (m. 1999; div. 2003) Casey Wiegmann (m. 2007)
- Children: 2

Danni Boatwright Wiegmann (born Danielle E. Boatwright; July 13, 1975) is an American actress, TV host, sports journalist, model and beauty queen. She was the winner of Survivor: Guatemala, the eleventh season of the reality television show Survivor, and finished in 19th place in the show's 40th season Survivor: Winners at War.

Boatwright was born in Tonganoxie, Kansas. She represented Kansas at the nationally televised Miss Teen USA and Miss USA pageants, and is one of the most successful delegates to compete in both competitions.

== Pageantry ==
Boatwright is an accomplished model, having worked internationally, and is also an athlete: in 2003, she ran the Country Music Marathon in Tennessee. Boatwright's first major pageant title came in late 1991 when she won the Miss Kansas Teen USA title and became the first representative of the Vanbros pageant group. Boatwright represented Kansas at the 1992 Miss Teen USA pageant in Biloxi, Mississippi and placed second behind Miss North Carolina Teen USA Rachel Adcocks in the preliminary competition. During the final competition, Boatwright placed second in the interview and evening gown rounds and fourth in the swimsuit portion. Overall, she was ranked second going into the final stage of the competition, but dropped a place and so became the second runner-up to the eventual winner Jamie Solinger of Iowa.

Four years later Boatwright won the Miss Kansas USA 1996 crown, and represented her state in the national Miss USA competition, broadcast live from South Padre Island, Texas. In that pageant, Boatwright won the preliminary competition and also the interview and swimsuit competitions on finals night. She finished first runner-up to Ali Landry of Louisiana, making her one of the most successful delegates to compete in both competitions.

== Modeling ==
During the Miss Teen USA pageant, Boatwright was introduced to an international modeling scout and started a career as a model. She has traveled as an international model in different countries including Italy, England, Germany, France, Mexico, South Africa, Australia, and Tunisia. She appeared on Star Search at the age of 17 as a spokesmodel and contestant, the youngest ever to appear in this category. She has also appeared in numerous television and print advertisements, most recently in ads for BioSilk.

== Survivor ==
=== Guatemala ===
In 2005, Boatwright competed in Survivor: Guatemala, the 11th season of reality television show Survivor. She was initially placed on the Nakúm tribe. On Day 9, a tribe switch landed her on the Yaxha tribe. At the post-merge Survivor Auction, she bought herself an advantage at the next immunity challenge. After the challenge, she made connections with Rafe Judkins and Lydia Morales, even forming a Final Two deal with Judkins. At the Final Four immunity challenge, Boatwright failed to win immunity, losing to Judkins. However, she convinced him that it was in his best interest to keep her over the much physically weaker Morales. Judkins agreed and Morales was unanimously voted out. Boatwright then won the final immunity challenge and, after Judkins released her from their earlier Final Two agreement, she chose Stephenie LaGrossa to bring to the final Tribal Council because she viewed LaGrossa as easier to beat and as equally deserving as Judkins. At the final Tribal Council, the jury was very angry with LaGrossa for her devious gameplay. Boatwright won the title of Sole Survivor in a 6–1 vote, only losing Judkins's vote.

=== Winners at War ===
After a 15-year and 29-season hiatus from the series, Boatwright returned to compete on Survivor: Winners at War. She quickly aligned with Rob Mariano, Parvati Shallow and Ethan Zohn as a member of an "Old-School" alliance on the Sele tribe. However, after accidentally revealing the existence of the alliance in a conversation with Zohn and Ben Driebergen, Mariano felt she couldn't be trusted, and she became the third person voted out of the game. On day 35, Boatwright became a permanent member of the jury after failing to return to the game from the Edge of Extinction. She voted for Tony Vlachos to win the title of Sole Survivor, which he accomplished in a 12-4-0 vote.

== Professional and personal life ==
Boatwright lives in Tonganoxie, Kansas and is an on-air personality for KCSP, also known as 610 Sports, in Kansas City. She is the co-host of "Sports Rap" every Sunday from 10:00 to noon. She also appeared on The Fantasy Show on ESPN2. Boatwright was the first host of CelebTV.com, an entertainment news website. In 2006, she became a spokeswoman for Coleman products. She can also be seen in online promotional videos for the Trackstick GPS tracking device. She also started a sports clothing label called Sideline Chic. Most recently, her name appeared on a trademark application for BEYOND THE EDIT WITH DANNI & AGGIE entertainment services, podcasts, etc.

Boatwright was once married to country music singer Wade Hayes, and appeared in the music video for his 1998 single "Tore Up from the Floor Up." She is now married to Casey Wiegmann, a former NFL center. They have two sons, Bo, born on October 8, 2007, and Stone, born on November 1, 2010.

Preceded by Tom Westman	Winner of Survivor; Survivor: Guatemala	Succeeded by Aras Baskauskas
