= Beacom =

Beacom is a surname. Notable people with the surname include:

- Colin Beacom (born 1937), English badminton player
- Gary Beacom (born 1960), Canadian figure skater, choreographer, and author
- Genevieve Beacom (born 2004), Australian baseball pitcher
- Karl Beacom (1938–2015), Canadian lawn bowler
- Mike Beacom, American sportswriter
