= Matthew Berry =

American sportswriter (born 1969/1970)

- Born: Matthew J. Berry; 1969 or 1970 (age 56–57); Denver, Colorado, U.S.
- Other names: Mr. 100, Talented Mr. Roto, TMR
- Education: Syracuse University
- Occupations: Fantasy sports analyst, writer, author
- Years active: 1999–present
- Father: Leonard Berry

Matthew J. Berry (born 1969/1970) is an American writer, columnist, fantasy sports analyst, and television personality. Berry started his career by writing for television and film and creating a few pilots and film scripts with his writing partner Eric Abrams. After writing for Rotoworld as a side-job, Berry launched his own fantasy sports websites "TalentedMr.Roto.com" in 2004 and "Rotopass.com". Berry worked for ESPN from 2007 to 2022 as their "Senior Fantasy Sports Analyst".

== Early life ==
Berry was born in Denver, Colorado, to Nancy and Leonard Berry. He is Jewish, although nonpracticing. The family moved several times, including to Richmond, Virginia, Atlanta, Georgia, and Charlottesville, Virginia. From the age of 12 to adulthood he was raised in College Station, Texas. His mother is the former mayor of the city and his father is a professor for Texas A&M University.

Berry graduated from the S.I. Newhouse School of Public Communications at Syracuse University in 1992 with a degree in electronic media.

== Hollywood writer ==
After graduation, Berry moved to Los Angeles to work in show business. After a few odd jobs Berry got hired as a production assistant for The George Carlin Show on Fox. Berry worked on the show for one year and has fond memories of George Carlin who wrote a recommendation letter for the Warner Brothers Writer's Workshop. Thanks in part to the recommendation, Berry was accepted to the workshop, officially getting him into the LA writing scene. During his writing tenure, he worked on such movies as Crocodile Dundee in Los Angeles, and the final year of the TV show Married... with Children. Crocodile Dundee was nominated for a Razzie award in 2001 under the category of "Worst Remake or Sequel", but lost to Planet of the Apes. Berry gained further (possibly unwanted) attention for Crocodile Dundee in Los Angeles after Paul Hogan filed a lawsuit against Berry and the Writers Guild of America because Berry and Eric Abrams were credited as writers, while Hogan insisted that he was the only one who wrote it. Berry and Abrams maintained their writing credits.

== Fantasy sports career ==
=== Transition to fantasy sports ===
On the July 26, 2007, episode of Bill Simmons' The B.S. Report with Bill Simmons podcast, he told the abridged version of how he went from Hollywood screenwriter to fantasy expert. He eventually grew tired of being in meetings with two movie stars he didn't think were funny telling him what comedy was. Even though he was in Hollywood, writing scripts and screenplays for movies and TV shows, he was still miserable. He asked a small fantasy site (RotoWorld.com) if he could do a column for them. He has been playing fantasy sports ever since he was 14; "it's my passion," he said on the podcast. The site did in fact hire him to do a column, because "Married... with Children is their favorite show." Berry wrote for Rotoworld from 1999 to 2003, when he was let go after the site wanted to lower his pay from $100 a week to $25 a week.

Berry then started two fantasy web sites in addition to his Hollywood writing. He started RotoPass.com, a site which aggregates multiple fantasy sports sites that use paywalls, and TalentedMrRoto.com, a fantasy content site. The popularity of these sites led to him dropping his full-time job and focusing on fantasy sports. He also appeared on several media outlets as a fantasy expert.

Prior to joining ESPN exclusively, Matthew spent 2005 and 2006 writing the daily fantasy blog for Major League Baseball on MLB.com as well as writing a weekly fantasy column for NBA.com while also serving as editor of the 2005 and 2006 NBA.com Fantasy Basketball Magazine. In addition, he spent those two years making multiple weekly appearances as the official Fantasy Sports Expert for the Fox Sports Radio Network.

=== ESPN and the fantasy explosion ===
Radio host Steve Mason, who was working for FOX at the time, was a fan of the TMR column and asked Berry to do a segment, which ended up lasting over an hour. He eventually was asked to do more guest appearances and was soon hired as their fantasy analyst. Mason then left to go to ESPN Radio, where he introduced Berry to staff in the ESPN base of Bristol, Connecticut. He did a two-hour fantasy show there, which led him to spots on Cold Pizza. That grew into doing segments on ESPNEWS, which led to his getting a column in ESPN The Magazine. That allowed him to start The Fantasy Show.

Berry's relationship with ESPN grew to the point that it purchased TalentedMrRoto.com and hired Berry as director of fantasy sports in February 2007.

As the popularity and demand for fantasy sports rose, so did Matthew Berry's profile on the network. Berry appeared on the Fantasy Insider on ESPNEWS and First Take once or twice a week, doing a "Fantasy Minute". Berry has also been featured on SportsCenter, NFL Live, Olbermann, Football Today, etc.

Berry also has a frequent presence on ESPN.com in various mediums outside of his columns. Berry has been featured in fantasy videos, which have included "Fantasy Football Now", "Start 'Em, Sit 'Em", "GMC Pro Grade League", "Working the Wire", and the "Fantasy Focus VideoCasts"—both football and baseball. Berry and Ravitz co-starred the VideoCasts along with Paul Severino, Molly Qerim, Jon Anik, and various others. He also chats with fans on ESPN SportsNation. On March 9, 2009, Berry set the record for longest chat on ESPN.com with a mark of 13 hours and 12 minutes. He beat the previous mark set by Rob Neyer who chatted for 12 hours and 1 minute.

In 2013, Berry was named the 2013 Marketer of the Year by the Academy of Marketing Science for his role in fueling the national growth of fantasy football.

The popularity of fantasy sports, and Berry's status as one of the leading voices of them, led to him stepping in front of the camera in numerous occasions. In 2008, Berry played a guest role on the soap opera One Life to Live. In 2009, Berry filmed a segment for Dancing with the Stars, a fellow Disney product. Berry also made a guest appearance as himself in an episode of the FX fantasy sports sitcom The League in 2011.

==== Fantasy Focus Podcast ====
Berry began his first foray into audio podcasting in 2007 with the Fantasy Forget (Four Get) where he gave "four players to leave off your roster this week." In June 2007, Berry and fellow ESPN fantasy analyst Nate Ravitz were announced as the full-time hosts of the Fantasy Focus Baseball Podcast and, soon after, the Fantasy Focus Football Podcast. Ravitz was replaced in 2015 by Field Yates. The shows are produced by Daniel Dopp and have featured many recurring ESPN guests such as Stephania Bell, Mike Clay, and Tristan Cockcroft.

These podcasts, much like Berry's columns, involve a mix of fantasy advice and comedic musings. Common features on the shows include the "Name Game," "Over-reaction Theater," "Mailbag," and "Double Trouble." The Fantasy Focus uses user-created drops for certain features and other funny/off-kilter sounds, occasionally simply to test if their producer is actually paying attention.

Berry announced on the last episode of the 2013 Fantasy Focus Baseball Podcast that he would not return to host the podcast for the 2014 season. This was announced immediately after Nate Ravitz announced his departure from the show.

The Fantasy Focus Football podcast is ESPN's most downloaded original-content podcast (and second overall behind only the podcast version of Pardon the Interruption). It consistently ranks among the top ten podcasts on iTunes and in August 2009, was the #1 audio podcast on all of iTunes. The show has won a total of five awards from PodcastAwards.com, including "Best Sports Podcast" in 2009, 2011, and 2012, and the overall "People's Choice" podcast in 2009 and 2012.

==== ESPN.com columns and articles ====
Berry has a comedic and often self-deprecating voice in his articles. He more often than not acknowledges his false predictions rather than his correct ones, both in the form of angry e-mails and tweets from people who followed his advice for the worse. Berry is a frequent target for criticism because he is vocal about his opinions on players and their projected performance. "You don't see people getting upset about middle-of-the-road guys. I guess that means I'm doing my job well." His articles generally begin with a short introduction involving experiences from his personal life. Pop culture references and quips will often be found during the otherwise serious fantasy advice portions.

Berry initially wrote two main fantasy columns for ESPN, "The Talented Mr. Roto" and "TRUM: Thoughts, Ramblings, Useless Info and Musings". However, his last post on the TRUM blog post was written in October 2011.

Currently, Berry writes a number of larger fantasy articles annually for what is now known as ESPN's Fantasy Football Draft Kit. First, there is "100 Facts", which is both printed in ESPN The Magazine and posted on ESPN.com. Second is the "Draft Day Manifesto," where he goes over basic and advanced stats and tips to help ensure you succeed in your draft without necessarily recommending certain players. Third is Berry's pre-draft Love/Hate. Love/Hate focuses on players who he feels are being over or under drafted. He originally wrote Love/Hate, 100 Facts, and a Bold Predictions column for Fantasy baseball as well, but penned his final editions of these in 2014 to focus on football.

Along with the articles, Berry also maintains a top 200 rankings and individual position rankings for the NFL from preseason through week 17.

Berry frequently emphasizes that a player on the "Hate" list are not players that he believes will play poorly, but instead players that are being drafted too high or started too often. For example, in the pre-season article preparing readers for the draft, a usual first-rounder on the "Hate" list might be thought by Berry to deserve to go about five spots lower than he normally does, while later-round players on the "Love" list are players Berry would draft a round or two higher than expected. In the football articles, he names the players he likes significantly better than the other ESPN rankers for that week (i.e., 'Love'), and the guys who he likes significantly less than the other ESPN rankers for that weeks (i.e., 'Hate'). Berry is one of only five people to be named to the Hall of Fame for Fantasy Sports Trade Association and Fantasy Sports Writers Association.

=== NBC Sports ===
In 2022, Berry left ESPN and joined NBC Sports to serve primarily as a fantasy football analyst, hosting the Peacock studio shows Fantasy Football Happy Hour and Fantasy Football Pregame. He would also be a contributor for Football Night in America.

=== Past work/appearances ===
Berry has made a variety of appearances throughout his career. Berry has appeared on SportingNews.com, The Sporting News magazine, NFL Network, NBA TV, Fox Sports Net, Sporting News Radio, SportsIllustrated.com, Fox Sports Radio, Slam, and XM & Sirius Satellite Radio.

== Filmography, television, and audio ==
Year	Title	Roles	Notes
1994–1996	Roseanne	Writer	3 episodes
1995	Kirk	Writer	2 episodes
1996	Ink	Story editor	TV series
1996–1997	Married... with Children	Story editor/writer (Season 11)	24 episodes
1996–1997	Grace Under Fire	Writer	2 episodes
1996–1997	Grace Under Fire	Producer	25 episodes
1997	Union Square	Writer	2 episodes
1997–1998	Ellen	Writer	2 episodes
1997–1998	Ellen	Supervising producer	22 episodes
1998	Conrad Bloom	Co-producer	TV series
2000	Daddio	Writer	1 episode
2001	Crocodile Dundee in Los Angeles	Writer	Feature film
2001	Gary & Mike	Supervising producer	TV series
2002–2007	Reba	Writer	14 episodes
2002–2007	Reba	Executive producer	71 episodes
2003	Abby	Supervising producer/writer (1 ep)	TV series
2003	Oliver Beene	Story	TV series
2006	ESPN, ESPN2, ESPNews	Fantasy football analyst	Appears on multiple ESPN broadcasts to give fantasy analysis, especially during football season.
2007	ESPN Fantasy Focus Podcast	Fantasy Analyst	Podcast. Left FF Baseball in 2013.
2007–2012	Desperate Housewives	Writer	10 episodes
2007–2012	Desperate Housewives	Executive producer	110 episodes
2008	One Life to Live	Neil Silver	TV series
2008	Fantasy Football Now	Co-host	Sports show
2009	Dancing with the Stars	Guest appearance	Competition show
2011	The League	Himself	TV series
2011–2015	Mike & Mike	Guest appearances	TV series/Radio
2012–2013	Mailbu Country	Writer	2 episodes
2012–2013	Mailbu Country	Co-executive producer	17 episodes
2013	60 Minutes Sports	Himself	TV series documentary
2013	How Did This Get Made?	Himself	Podcast episode about the making of Crocodile Dundee in Los Angeles
2014	Devious Maids	Writer	1 episode
2014–2021	Last Man Standing	Writer	8 episodes
2014–2021	Last Man Standing	Executive producer	111 episodes
2019	Avengers: Endgame	S.H.I.E.L.D. Agent	Cameo
2024–2026	Happy's Place	Writer	4 episodes
2024–2026	Happy's Place	Executive producer	9 episodes
2025	Big Brother: Unlocked	Himself	Companion show with Big Brother 27

All information from IMDB.

== Awards and achievements ==
- New York Times Bestseller, Fantasy Life
- Sports Emmy Award for ESPN's Fantasy Football Now
- Fantasy Sports Trade Association Hall of Fame Class of 2012
- Fantasy Sports Writer Association Hall of Fame Class of 2010
- Five-time Fantasy Sports Writers Association Awards (2005–06) winner
- Writer of the Year (Basketball)
- USA Today NFL Top 100 Most Important People
- Best Article on the Web (Football)
- Most Humorous Article, Best Major Media Article x2 (Baseball)
- Five-time Podcast Awards Winner (w/ co-host Nate Ravitz)
- People's Choice (2009, '12), ESPN Fantasy Focus Football
- Sports (2009, '11, '12), ESPN Fantasy Focus Football
- Sports (2013), ESPN Fantasy Focus Baseball
- Sports (2012), Marketer of the Year" by Academy of Marketing Science
- Sports (2017), FTSA Award Best Fantasy Show
- Sports (2017), Analyst of the Year

== Personal life ==
Berry's sports team allegiances lie from coast to coast. He is a Texas A&M fan because of his close familial ties with the program, having season tickets in his youth. Due to his residences in Virginia, Berry's favorite NFL team became the Washington Commanders. During his time in Los Angeles, Berry gained an affinity for the Los Angeles Angels, and Los Angeles Lakers. As of October 27, 2010, Berry has adopted a support for the London-based football club West Ham United F.C. Berry is also a friend to many stars including Jay-Z, Seth Meyers, and Zooey Deschanel helping them with fantasy world advice. Berry resides in Connecticut with his wife, Beth Berry (who also works for ESPN), and their five children.
