= SportsNation (website) =

Interactive sports debate and polling site on ESPN.com

SportsNation is a feature section on ESPN.com, labeled "Where America's Sports Fans Meet".

== Programming ==
Daily features include "The Show", which consisted of "The Morning Quickie with Dan Shanoff" until September 2006. Depending on the sports in season, there may be two to three shows on that sport. Currently, after The Morning Buzz, fantasy analysis is presented from any of Christopher Harris, Matthew Berry, Stephania Bell, Scott Engel, AJ Mass, Nate Ravitz, Eric Karabell, and Tristan Cockcroft. On Monday Nights, Buzz used to chat during the Monday Night Football game. But that has been discontinued.

== The Morning Buzz ==
"The Morning Buzz" was the first of many chat sessions and took place every weekday from 10am EST to 11am EST, followed by chat sessions with other notable ESPN.com personalities; along with celebrities and athletes. The Morning Buzz discussed current sports news, along with pop culture, pop tarts and the chatters' lunch selection for the day. The most infamous chatter on the Morning Buzz was Hurricane Jeff from Byesville, Ohio. At the beginning of every post, Hurricane would reintroduce himself. Hurricane Jeff was eventually banned from the Morning Buzz for trying to replace Robert's WIR with the Weekly Whisper. Hurricane Jeff was a controversial character and will go down in history as one of the most influential and creative chatters on the Morning Buzz. A Facebook page for chatters on the Morning Buzz has been created, and started both awards and a Hall of Fame for chatters. Common jokes included Rich Rodriguez, Zach Rastall being pond scum, and fat jokes aimed towards buzz. At 50 past the hour, everyone posted what they were having for lunch. When Buzz was off for the day(or week) the infamous Buzzette filled in and took his place. Buzz announced on September 23, 2011 that the Morning Buzz will officially end on Friday, September 30, 2011.

== The Week in Review ==
The Week in Review (abbreviated WIR in the chat) is a long post written by Robert in Raleigh NC every Friday. The WIR generally is posted around 10:50 and reviews topics from the week in a story format. The topics which are generally unrelated, are tied together in some way. The WIR started when a chat user asked what happened during a week of chat that he missed. Robert responded using a similar format to the current WIR and most of the chat users enjoyed it, so the WIR became a weekly segment.

In late 2007, Robert posted that he had to leave the Morning Buzz to do discipline at work and the WIR stopped. During the last week in February, Robert returned to the chat and posted his first WIR on February 29.

An example of a WIR that was posted on February 29, 2008 is shown below:

Robert (Raleigh NC): Back back back back back, the WIR is not gone, but back! I was cruising up to a grocery store in Negativetown / Killadelphia in my Yugo in search of the perfect Bloody Mary. The store was packed with all kinds of crazy people. One guy was trying to figure out the difference between Cilantro and Parsley while others were buying box wine for their party at the stupid hotel and some were getting ready for their appearance on the Pulse. Just when everything seemed normal, I misremembered where I was; this was Killadelphia and nothing is normal there. About that time employees started running through the store with machine guns attacking each other. I started telling bad knock knock jokes to try and calm people down, but it didn't work. I told them about my man crush on Will Ferrell, that didn't work either. I even offered them my Spice Girl tickets. Nothing. I ran back out to my car in 18.6 seconds and the worst thing possible had happened. Some stupid valet had backed into my bumper. My bumper was destroyed. I didn't even get my Bloody Mary mix. Now my pride, like my bumper, was destroyed. Then I realized it was February 31, therefore, none of this happened. The WIR did not like hibernation and is glad to be back.

== The End of The Morning Buzz ==
On September 23, 2011 at 10:15 ET, Buzz announced that The Morning Buzz was going to be canceled. Buzz stated,

With sadness, I have to inform you that next week will be our last week of The Morning Buzz. Starting Oct. 3, we are pushing our chat start times back to 11 a.m., starting the day with our fantasy chats and then after football season, pushing the chat start times back to noon..........and commence.....

The last chat was held on September 30, ending its 4-year run.
