= Field Yates =

American sportswriter (born 1987)

- Born: Field Minister Yates; April 23, 1987 (age 39); Boston, Massachusetts, U.S.
- Education: Wesleyan University (BA)
- Years active: 2008–present
- Presenting career
- Show: Fantasy Focus (2018-present)
- Station: ESPN Radio
- Country: United States
- Football career

Profile
- Position: Safety

Personal information
- Listed height: 5 ft 11 in (1.80 m)
- Listed weight: 200 lb (91 kg)

Career information
- High school: Belmont Hill School
- College: Wesleyan Cardinals

Field Minister Yates (born April 23, 1987) is an American sportswriter and analyst, who is an NFL Insider at ESPN where he provides NFL and fantasy football insight. A graduate of Wesleyan University, where he was a two sport athlete, and a former member of the Kansas City Chiefs coaching staff, he has worked at ESPN since 2012.

== Early life ==
Yates was born in Boston, Massachusetts, on April 23, 1987. He attended Belmont Hill School and was a member of their football team and lacrosse team. As a tight end and linebacker, he was named to the All-Independent School League. He later attended Wesleyan University where he graduated with a degree in psychology. At Wesleyan, he was a member of the football team and lacrosse team.

== Career ==
=== NFL ===
Yates intended to pursue a career in either coaching or scouting football. His career was heading that way as he interned with the New England Patriots for four seasons during his high school and college years. With the Patriots, Yates worked in a variety of scouting and coaching duties. From 2009 to 2011, he worked for the Kansas City Chiefs in their scouting and coaching department. During his first year with the Chiefs, Yates worked as an in-house scout and soon after worked as an assistant to head coach Todd Haley. Yates spent games in the coaching box and charted defensive plays.

=== ESPN ===
Yates has stated that he ended up in broadcasting and journalism "by complete accident." After leaving the Chiefs organization, he spent time writing a football blog and writing for some football sites. In 2011, he connected with ESPN reporter Mike Reiss, who then served as a mentor to Yates. Yates helped Reiss with his coverage of the Patriots during the 2012 NFL draft and the 2012 New England Patriots season.

After first covering the Patriots for ESPN Boston, ESPN hired Yates and assigned him to a variety of duties. At ESPN, Yates serves as a football analyst, who covers the NFL and provides fantasy football insight. He co-hosts the Fantasy Focus podcast on ESPN Radio. He also hosts ESPN 2's Sunday pregame show Fantasy Football Now, which he was previously a contributor to, and serves as a contributor to Monday Night Football as the host of Monday Tailgate.

He previously served as the host of ESPN Radio's shows Operation Football and Football Friendzy. Yates is also a regular contributor to NFL Live, SportsCenter, The Fantasy Show on ESPN+ and to ESPN's coverage of the NFL draft.
