= Lenny Pappano =

Lenny Pappano (born February 14, 1964) is a fantasy sports writer from upstate NY and co-founder of DraftSharks.com, a fantasy football content site based in Rochester, NY.

== Biography ==
Direct Mail Copywriter: Pappano graduated in 1986 from State University of NY at Cortland with a BA in political science. After a few odd jobs, Pappano was accepted at the National Journalism Center in Washington D.C. in 1992, then began his career as a direct mail copywriter for Eberle Associates the following year.

Pappano worked for a number of clients including Chinese human rights activist Harry Wu, head of the Laogai Research Foundation. Before ending his career at Eberle in 2000, Pappano wrote copy for the largest prison ministry in the world – Prison Fellowship.

== Transition to Fantasy Sports Writer ==
In 1999, Pappano and Michael Hiban launched the Draftsharks.com website in June 1999. The site offered the first online “value based drafting” tool, as well as the industry's first free daily fantasy football email updates. The Wall Street Journal recognized the free email updates in 2009.

"We admire Draft Sharks' tenacity and found its newsy and gossipy email updates useful and entertaining.”

One year later, Mashable dubbed Draft Sharks as one of the 10 best fantasy football sites on the web.

== First High Stakes Fantasy Sports Live Event ==
In 2002, Pappano and Emil Kadlec co-founded the first ever high-stakes fantasy sports event, the World Championship of Fantasy Football (WCOFF). The WCOFF drew thousands of participants to live locations in Las Vegas, Nevada, Atlantic City, New Jersey, and Orlando, Florida every year from 2002 to 2009. The event won several awards from the Fantasy Sports Trade Association in 2006. Pappano and Kadlec sold the event in 2007 to an investment group (Gridiron Fantasy Sports LLC), who eventually filed for bankruptcy in 2011.

== Fantasy Sports Writers Association ==
Pappano was a founding board member of the Fantasy Sports Writers Association (FSWA) in 2004. He won an FSWA award in 2005 for “Best Online Article” and is still an active board member.
