= The Fantasy Show =

- Starring: Rob Stone; Matthew Berry; Ron Jaworski
- Country of origin: United States

Production
- Producer: John Coleman
- Running time: 30 minutes

Original release
- Network: ESPN2
- Release: August 31 – November 9, 2006

The Fantasy Show is a fantasy football talk and debate show on ESPN2. The show was supposed to air for 18 weeks a year during the National Football League season every Thursday at 6:30 p.m. ET on ESPN2. However, the debut season of the show only had 11 episodes.

== Overview ==
The thirty-minute program consisted of stats, charts, recommended benchings, trash talking, trade debates, and updates on the personalities of The Fantasy Show's own fantasy football league. The Fantasy Draft Special aired at a special time at 5:30 p.m. ET on Thursday, August 31, 2006. An odd thing about The Fantasy Show compared to other shows is that it was broadcast in a living room-type set, and Stone, Berry, and Jaworski were dressed in casual apparel. It was produced by ESPN Original Entertainment.

=== Hosts and contributors ===
The show was hosted by ESPN veteran Rob Stone, who has covered the MLS and World Cup the majority of his time at ESPN. Joining Stone were fantasy expert Matthew Berry from TalentedMrRoto.com and seventeen-year NFL veteran Ron Jaworski. Others contributing to the show were Will Carroll, who served as the Injury Insider; Antonio Freeman, hosting the segment called Free's Flex, where he would inform fantasy players of the second and third wide receivers they needed to acquire and start; and Danni Boatwright, who also contributed to the show.

=== Cancellation or termination ===
On November 16, ESPN failed to air The Fantasy Show, broadcasting the 2006 World Series of Poker instead. Fans of The Fantasy Show appeared on various Internet websites asking about the sudden disappearance and apparent cancellation of the show by ESPN. Confusing the matter, Internet TV listing websites, including Yahoo!, continued to list The Fantasy Show as airing at 5:30 p.m. ET on ESPN2 on November 23, one week after the first missed episode. Meanwhile, ESPN seemed to indicate that the show was over by its lack of any further mention of the show. ESPN's own TV listing website, espntv.com, showed the 2006 World Series of Poker as airing during that time. Further, the links to The Fantasy Show on ESPN's website pointed to a web page that no longer existed.

On November 22, a post at Berry's official website inquired if the show was cancelled. The response from one of the website's other employees was as follows:

"No, fear not, Legion of TMR fans. There was no cancellation. In fact, the Fantasy Show was definitely well received by all. This is merely the end of the first season's run. Look for bigger and better things coming down the pike... but I'll let the TMR announce such things when and how he sees fit."

Pete
____________________
Becker@talentedmrroto.com
