= Survivor: Guatemala =

- Season 11
- Region 1 DVD cover
- Presented by: Jeff Probst
- No. of days: 39
- No. of castaways: 18
- Winner: Danni Boatwright
- Runner-up: Stephenie LaGrossa
- Location: Yaxhá-Nakúm-Naranjo National Park, Petén, Guatemala
- No. of episodes: 15

Release
- Original network: CBS
- Original release: September 15 – December 11, 2005

Additional information
- Filming dates: June 27 – August 4, 2005

Season chronology
- ← Previous; Palau Next → Panama — Exile Island

Survivor: Guatemala — The Maya Empire (commonly referred to as Survivor: Guatemala) is the eleventh season of the American CBS competitive reality television series Survivor. Filming took place from June 27, 2005, through August 4, 2005, and the season premiered on September 15, 2005. It was filmed in the Yaxhá-Nakúm-Naranjo National Park near the more popular Tikal National Park in northern Guatemala. Originally, the season was scheduled to be filmed in a location on the Indian Ocean, with scouting taking place in Madagascar, Southern India, and Sri Lanka. However, due to the 2004 Indian Ocean earthquake and tsunami, the plans were scrapped. Hosted by Jeff Probst, it consisted of the usual 39 days of gameplay with 18 competitors.

Danni Boatwright won the title of Sole Survivor, defeating LaGrossa in a 6–1 jury vote.

== Format ==
Survivor is a reality television show created by Mark Burnett and Charlie Parsons and based on the Swedish show Expedition Robinson. The series follows a number of participants who are isolated in a remote location, where they must provide food, fire, and shelter for themselves. Every three days, one participant is removed from the series by majority vote, with challenges being held to give a reward (ranging from living and food-related prizes to a car) and immunity from being voted off the show. The last remaining player is awarded a prize of $1,000,000.

== Contestants ==
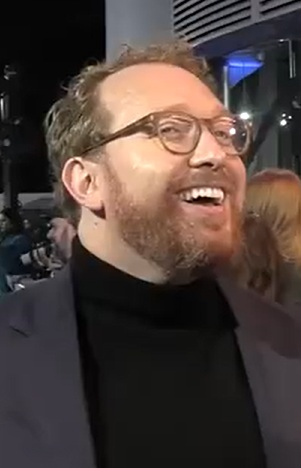
Rafe Judkins

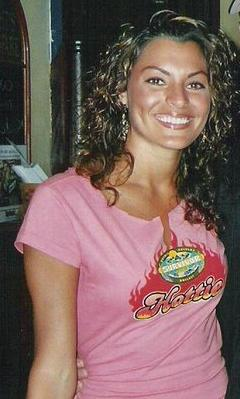
Stephenie LaGrossa

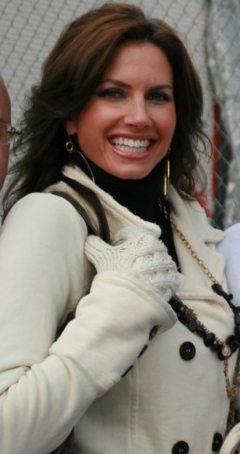
Danni Boatwright

Notable cast members include former Survivor: Palau castaways Stephenie LaGrossa and Bobby Jon Drinkard, former beauty queen and model-turned radio announcer Danni Boatwright, ex-NFL quarterback Gary Hogeboom, and film and television writer Rafe Judkins.

List of Survivor: Guatemala - The Maya Empire contestants
Contestant	Age	From	Tribe			Finish	
Contestant	Age	From	Original	Switched	Merged	Placement	Day
Jim Lynch	63	Northglenn, Colorado	Nakúm			1st voted out	Day 3
Morgan McDevitt	21	Decatur, Illinois	Yaxhá			2nd voted out	Day 6
Brianna Varela	21	Edmonds, Washington	Yaxhá			3rd voted out	Day 8
Brooke Struck	25	Hood River, Oregon	Nakúm	Nakúm		4th voted out	Day 11
Blake Towsley	24	Dallas, Texas	Nakúm	Yaxhá		5th voted out	Day 14
Margaret Bobonich	43	Chardon, Ohio	Nakúm	Nakúm		6th voted out	Day 15
Brian Corridan	22	New York City, New York	Yaxhá	Yaxhá		7th voted out	Day 15
Amy O'Hara	39	Revere, Massachusetts	Yaxhá	Yaxhá		8th voted out	Day 18
Brandon Bellinger	22	Manhattan, Kansas	Nakúm	Yaxhá	Xhakúm	9th voted out	Day 21
Bobby Jon Drinkard Palau	28	Troy, Alabama	Nakúm	Yaxhá	Xhakúm	10th voted out 1st jury member	Day 24
Jamie Newton	24	Douglas, Georgia	Yaxhá	Nakúm	Xhakúm	11th voted out 2nd jury member	Day 27
Gary Hogeboom	46	Grand Haven, Michigan	Yaxhá	Yaxhá	Xhakúm	12th voted out 3rd jury member	Day 30
Judd Sergeant	34	Ridgefield, New Jersey	Nakúm	Nakúm	Xhakúm	13th voted out 4th jury member	Day 33
Cindy Hall	31	Naples, Florida	Nakúm	Nakúm	Xhakúm	14th voted out 5th jury member	Day 36
Lydia Morales	42	Lakewood, Washington	Yaxhá	Nakúm	Xhakúm	15th voted out 6th jury member	Day 37
Rafe Judkins	22	Pittsburgh, Pennsylvania	Yaxhá	Nakúm	Xhakúm	16th voted out 7th jury member	Day 38
Stephenie LaGrossa Palau	25	Toms River, New Jersey	Yaxhá	Nakúm	Xhakúm	Runner-up	Day 39
Danni Boatwright	29	Tonganoxie, Kansas	Nakúm	Yaxhá	Xhakúm	Sole Survivor	Day 39

=== Future appearances ===
Stephenie LaGrossa competed for her third time on Survivor: Heroes vs. Villains. Danni Boatwright returned for Survivor: Winners at War. LaGrossa competed a fourth time on Survivor 50: In the Hands of the Fans.

Outside of Survivor, LaGrossa competed on the USA Network reality competition series Snake in the Grass. LaGrossa also competed on the first season of the Peacock reality TV series The Traitors. In 2025, Boatwright also competed on 99 to Beat.

== Season summary ==
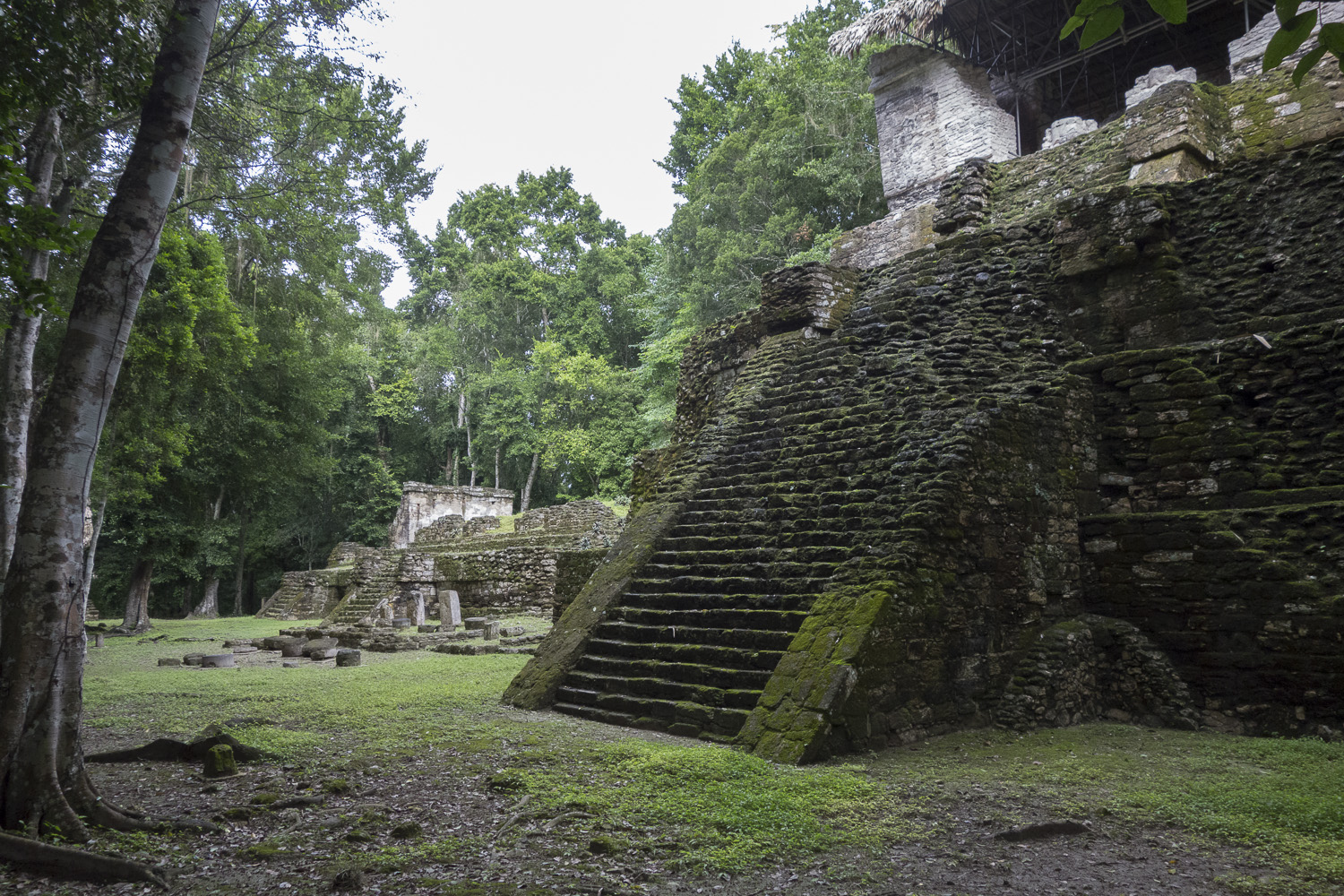
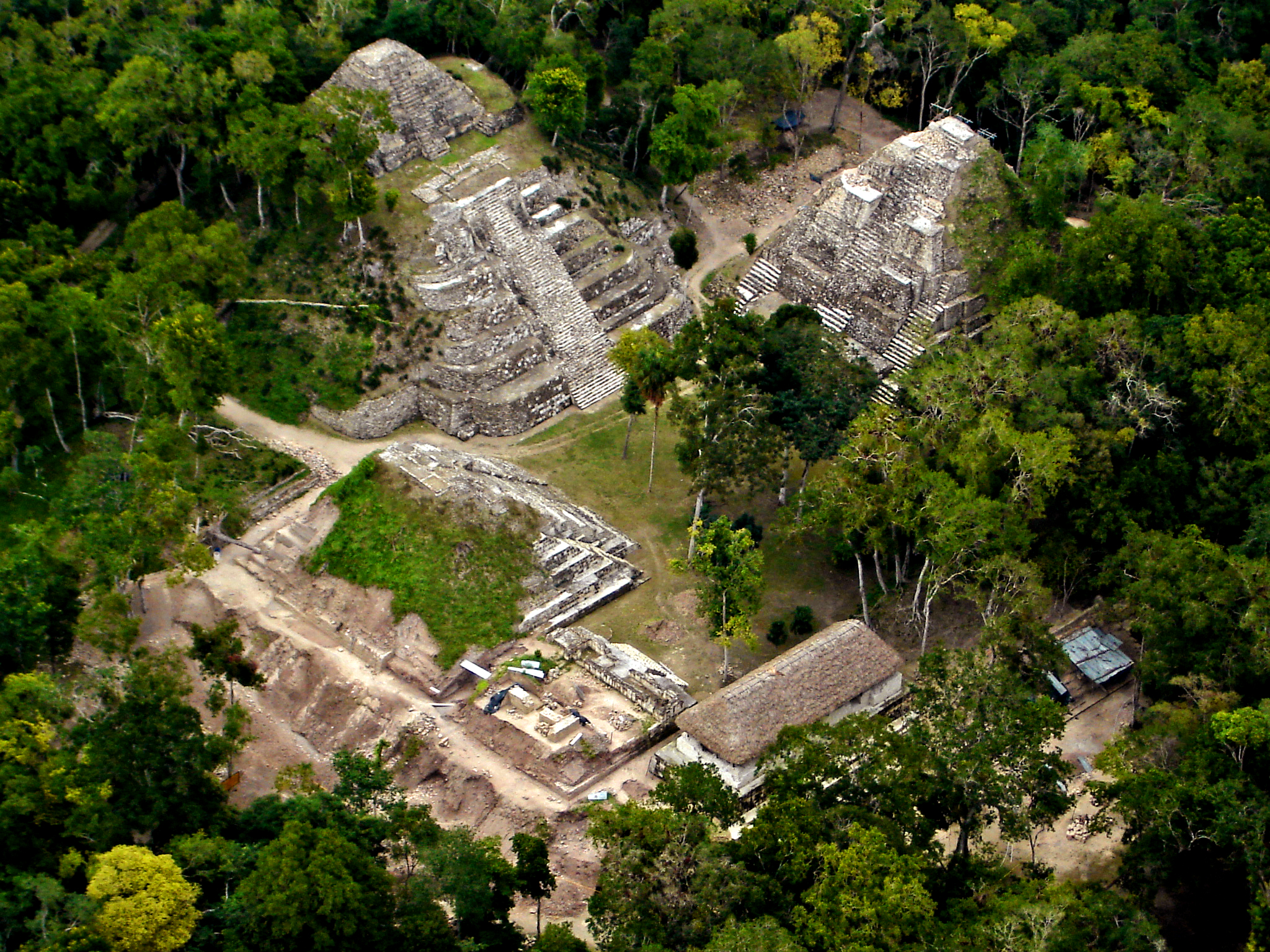
The Mayan ruins of Survivor Guatemala including the camp of Yaxhá/Xhákúm (top) and Tribal Council (bottom).

Sixteen of the 18 players in the game were already split into two tribes, Nakúm and Yaxhá; both tribes received one additional tribe member, Bobby Jon and Stephenie, respectively, both who had previously appeared on Survivor: Palau; Probst described these players as resources to help either tribe, but otherwise had no safety against being voted out. The first challenge began immediately, requiring both tribes to trek 11 miles (18 km) overnight through the jungle to one of the camps near Mayan ruins, along with any available supplies that they wished to carry. The trek left many of the players exhausted and dehydrated for several days following.

During the first nine days, the Nakúm tribe proved more successful at the challenges losing only one immunity challenge, sending Yaxhá to Tribal Council twice. During one challenge, Danni, a sportscaster, identified Gary as a former professional quarterback, though Gary would maintain that he was just a landscaper through most of the rest of the game. A tribal switch occurred on Day Ten that left Bobby Jon, Danni, Blake, and Brandon in the majority at Yaxhá, outnumbering Brian, Amy, and Gary. At Nakúm, the tribe was split 4–4 with Margaret, Judd, Cindy, and Brooke from the original Nakúm and Stephenie, Rafe, Jamie, and Lydia from the original Yaxhá. Immediately after the swap, Stephenie and Jamie formed an alliance with Judd to take control of Nakúm, which later included Rafe, Cindy, and Lydia. Though the two tribes performances were fairly even in wins and losses, a crucial immunity challenge won by Nakúm put them in a decisive 6–4 lead into the merge over Yaxhá. On Night 18, directly after the Yaxhá tribe had voted off Amy, they left for the Nakúm campsite where the two tribes merged into the Xhákúm tribe. Upon merging, the new tribe was informed of a hidden immunity idol located in the jungle, that could be used before the votes were cast to save themselves. However, the Nakúm alliance of six held strong initially as they voted off Brandon.

As a reward for winning a reward challenge, Judd received a clue to the hidden idol. To distract the other players, Judd lied about the clue's contents, which Gary was able to pick up on, locating the idol himself and using it to save himself from being eliminated at the next Tribal Council, where Bobby Jon was voted off in his place. Judd's lie became a focal point for Gary to attempt to break the original Nakúm voting block; though Gary was soon voted off, Stephenie and the other former Nakúm members felt Judd was no longer trustworthy and voted him out. At the reward challenge for the final five, a car was the reward prize. Cindy won the challenge, but was given an option by Jeff as a means to break the Survivor "car curse" (that no player that has won a car continued on to win the game) by exchanging her prize to give a car to each of the other four players. Cindy ultimately rejected the option, and was voted off at the next Tribal Council.

After Lydia's elimination, Stephenie became concerned on an earlier deal made by Rafe and Danni to take each other to the Final Tribal Council; though she struggled to remain in the final immunity challenge and outlast Danni, she ultimately lost, becoming emotional over her failure. Rafe informed Danni that she did not have to stay true to their previous deal, and at the following Tribal Council, Danni eliminated Rafe. The jury at the Final Tribal Council considered that Stephenie has played a more devious game than Danni and had backstabbed several of them, and ultimately gave Danni's more social play the win, six votes to one.

Challenge winners and eliminations by episode
Episode			Challenge winner(s)		Eliminated	
No.	Title	Original air date	Reward	Immunity	Tribe	Player
1	"Big Trek, Big Trouble, Big Surprise"	September 15, 2005	Nakúm	Yaxhá	Nakúm	Jim
2	"Man Down"	September 22, 2005	Nakúm	Nakúm	Yaxhá	Morgan
3	"The Brave May Not Live Long, but the Cautious Don't Live at All"	September 29, 2005	Nakúm	Nakúm	Yaxhá	Brianna
4	"To Betray, or Not to Betray"	October 6, 2005	Survivor; Questionnaire	Yaxhá	Nakúm	Brooke
5	"Crocs, Cowboys and City Slickers"	October 13, 2005	Yaxhá	Nakúm	Yaxhá	Blake
6	"Big Ball, Big Mouth, Big Trouble"	October 20, 2005	Nakúm	Rafe (Nakúm)	Nakúm	Margaret
6	"Big Ball, Big Mouth, Big Trouble"	October 20, 2005	Nakúm	Gary (Yaxhá) (Note: As an additional reward for winning individual immunity, Rafe was given a chance to award individual immunity to one member of Yaxhá; he chose Gary.)	Yaxhá	Brian
7	"Surprise Enemy Visit"	October 27, 2005	Yaxhá	Nakúm	Yaxhá	Amy
8	"The Hidden Immunity Idol"	November 3, 2005	None (Note: There was no reward challenge due to the merge.)	Gary	Xhakúm	Brandon
9	"Secrets and Lies and an Idol Surprise"	November 10, 2005	Judd [Bobby Jon, Stephenie] (Note: Each contestant received a different meal depending on how they placed in the challenge. Judd shared the first place meal with Bobby Jon and Stephenie.)	Jamie	Xhakúm	Bobby Jon
10	"Eating and Sleeping with the Enemy"	November 17, 2005	Danni, Gary, Judd, Stephenie	Rafe	Xhakúm	Jamie
11	"Everything Is Personal"	November 24, 2005	Cindy [Rafe]	Rafe	Xhakúm	Gary
12	"Price for Immunity"	December 1, 2005	Survivor Auction	Danni	Xhakúm	Judd
13	"Big Win, Big Decision, Big Mistake?"	December 8, 2005	Cindy [Stephenie]	Stephenie	Xhakúm	Cindy
14	"Thunder Storms & Sacrifice"	December 11, 2005	None	Rafe	Xhakúm	Lydia
14	"Thunder Storms & Sacrifice"	December 11, 2005	None	Danni	Xhakúm	Rafe
15	"The Reunion"	December 11, 2005				

Where one player won and invited others, the invitees are in brackets.

== Episodes ==
No. overall	No. in season	Title	Original release date	U.S. viewers (millions)	Rating/share (18–49)
153	1	"Big Trek, Big Trouble, Big Surprise"	September 15, 2005	18.41	6.6/19
The sixteen new castaways learned upon arriving in the Guatemalan jungle that they would be joined by Bobby Jon Drinkard and Stephenie LaGrossa from Survivor: Palau as they will also compete in the season (though on opposing teams, not as teammates as before). They were also told that their first challenge would be an 11-mile (18 km) hike to a campsite near some Mayan ruins.: Reward Challenge: Tribes must run through the jungles of Guatemala in an 11-mile trek. Bringing their belongings and some heavy supplies, they must locate an authentic Mayan pyramid at the end of the course. The first team to reach the pyramid wins flint and the right to live among the ruins.; After a grueling overnight hike, Bobby Jon's Nakúm tribe narrowly defeated Stephenie's Yaxhá tribe, giving them the right to live adjacently to the Mayan ruins, as the losing Yaxhá moved on to a less desirable campsite where they have to make their own shelter. Though victorious at their first challenge, the long hike left most of the Nakúm men cramped and in bad condition; Bobby Jon collapsed, Blake was sick shortly after being injured by a poisonous barbed plant, Jim had torn his biceps and, along with Judd, was endlessly vomiting. Despite this, medical practitioner Margaret tried to nurse them back to health.: Immunity Challenge: Using their canoes, the tribes would paddle out to buoys in the lake to retrieve a torch hung from each buoy. Racing back to shore, four members would run to the top of the hill and begin hauling up the canoe with a rope. The remaining tribe members would rotate logs underneath the canoe, allowing it to roll up the hill, much like the technique the Maya used to move large items. Once the canoe passed a finish line, each tribe's remaining member would run to the top of the hill with the torch and light the victory cauldron. The first tribe to light the cauldron wins Immunity. Should Yaxhá win the challenge, they would receive their flint.; In their inaugural immunity challenge, the fatigue of the Nakúm men hampered their performance, leading Yaxhá to their first victory as well as Stephenie's first win in a tribal immunity challenge. Back at Nakúm camp, the tribe decided to eliminate one of their ailing men. At tribal council, Nakúm deemed that Jim (the oldest man) was the most injured, and he was unanimously voted out.
154	2	"Man Down"	September 22, 2005	16.98	6.1/17
At Nakúm, Bobby Jon was disappointed losing the first immunity challenge, fearing that his Palau losing streak might happen again, while Blake's sickness grew worse. At Yaxhá, Gary decided not to divulge his past as a former NFL quarterback, fearing that Yaxhá might brand him as a threat or deem him as already wealthy; and as a solution, he introduced himself as Gary Hawkins and claimed that he works as a landscaper (actually his current job after retiring from American football).: Reward Challenge: One at a time, the Survivors must sprint up a ramp, over a net run to a giant rope web, where they must climb underneath it and gather hanging bags. After untying a bag, they must drop into the water and race with their bag back to the start, where the next person would be waiting to leave. Each tribe member must attempt to get a bag once. The winning tribe receives fishing supplies.; At the reward challenge, sickly Blake managed to narrowly outrun Brian, winning fishing supplies for Nakúm. After losing the challenge, Yaxhá found themselves desperately short on food, having been reduced to eating ants, grasshoppers and minnows. While at Nakúm, Blake's physical condition took a turn for the worse as he started to hyperventilate, annoying Judd.: Immunity Challenge: Tribes were tethered to ropes in a pit of mud. The first tribe to drag the other to their side of the mud pit and grab a flag would win that round. The first tribe with three flags would win Immunity. If no tribe reaches a flag in fifteen minutes, the challenge will be modified to one-on-one match-ups.; At the immunity challenge, the tribes found themselves in a stalemate, causing Jeff Probst to resort to conducting one-on-one bouts. During Judd and Gary's match, Danni (a sportscaster by profession) recognized Gary as the former quarterback Gary Hogeboom and revealed it to everyone else, giving Judd time to outsmart Gary, giving Nakúm their first point. Two rounds later, Nakúm remained undefeated, thus winning their first immunity challenge and giving Bobby Jon his first win at tribal immunity. Back at Yaxhá camp, Jamie felt threatened by Stephenie, and planned to vote her out, though Gary wanted to vote either Lydia (for being the weakest) or Morgan (for being lazy at camp). Later on, Brian turned on Gary due to Danni's revelation during the challenge, but he quickly denied the allegations. Brian later pleaded to Gary that they never lost a challenge because of Lydia's weakness and admitted that Lydia was more valuable for her work ethic and campaigned for Morgan to go instead for not doing much at camp, despite her athleticism in challenges. In the end, Brian's plan to save Lydia worked, and Morgan was voted out.
155	3	"The Brave May Not Live Long, but the Cautious Don't Live at All"	September 29, 2005	17.29	5.7/16
At Yaxhá, Brian congratulated himself about his plan of blindsiding Morgan at the last Tribal Council. The next day at Nakúm, zookeeper Cindy was fascinated about the howler monkeys waking them up every morning, but the loud noises left Judd aggravated.: Reward Challenge: Scattered around the challenge grounds are materials needed to construct an archeological tent. One sighted castaway must instruct his/her tribemates (blindfolded and tethered in pairs). After collecting all pieces, blindfolds can be removed and the tribe must assemble the tent. After assembling, the tribe must go back to their tribe mat. First to finish would win pillows, blankets and tarp.; During the reward challenge, Yaxhá collected their pieces first, but quickly stumbled as they build their tent, giving way to Nakúm's third consecutive win. Back at camp, Yaxhá started to be fed up with their usual corn mush meal, resorting to Gary and Rafe scouring for termites. Back at Nakúm, Judd and Bobby Jon complained about Margaret's bossiness about modifying their shelter.: Immunity Challenge: Castaways compete in an elevated net court with two hoops for both tribes. Tribes must face off in randomly selected threesomes, race to the ball thrown in the center, and then pass the ball to each other in an attempt to move within shooting distance of their hoops. If a player holds the ball, he/she cannot walk and must pass it to a tribemate (violating this will force the person’s tribe to hand the ball to the other tribe)The first tribe to throw the ball through a hoop would score for their tribe. The first tribe to score five points would win Immunity.; During the Mesoamerican ballgame immunity challenge, Stephenie got angry when she noticed Brianna inactive during their round and decided to pass the ball to an open Lydia, but Lydia walked with the ball (a breach in the challenge rules), forcing them to give the ball to Nakúm. In the final round, Danni shot it in the hoop, giving Nakúm another victory. Back at Yaxhá, a limping Amy confessed that she sprained her ankle during the challenge, but assured everyone that she was fine. Jamie, also fuming about Brianna's dismal challenge performance, campaigned for her ouster, while Brianna talked to Stephenie about targeting Lydia. In the end, the tribe agreed that Brianna is a liability, and she was next to go.
156	4	"To Betray, or Not to Betray"	October 6, 2005	17.92	6.3/17
At the Reward Challenge, the tribes were asked questions to find more out about everyone else, as well as assigning rewards such as a shower and a picnic. After a question which asked who had the most tribe pride, the tribes were reshuffled; Brooke, Cindy, Jamie, Judd, Lydia, Margaret, Rafe, and Stephenie were the new Nakúm and Amy, Blake, Bobby Jon, Brandon, Brian, Danni, and Gary were the new Yaxhá. Judd was very enthusiastic about being on a new tribe because he felt he was the least vulnerable, while Amy and Margaret were upset because they felt they were out of the running. Stephenie and Jamie began thinking that the two people most on the chopping block were Lydia, who had been on the chopping block before as being questionably weak, and Brooke, who they assumed as not very physical and could easily give them the number's advantage. At Nakúm, Judd formed a friendship with the former Yaxhá members on his tribe. Danni directly questioned Gary if he had been an NFL Quarterback, but as usual, he denied it.: Immunity Challenge: Both tribes paddle out and retrieve three tribe coloured bags containing Maya war clubs. They then throw the clubs at three targets 30, 40 and 50 feet away. First tribe to have three people hit the three targets wins immunity.; After the new Yaxhá tribe won the Immunity Challenge, Judd betrayed his original Nakúm teammates and helped to vote Brooke out.
157	5	"Crocs, Cowboys and City Slickers"	October 13, 2005	17.85	6.5/18
After Tribal Council, Margaret showed how frustrated she was with Judd for betraying Nakúm. At Yaxhá, Brian expressed how uncomfortable and annoyed he was about how religious his new tribe was.: Reward Challenge: The tribes had to go through three stations, first cutting a rope with a sharp rock, then through a log to release handles. The remaining four members had to use the handles to turn a wheel, which would pull a mine cart up the hill and a ramp. Six of the tribe members then had to climb into the cart, where the remaining member would cut the rope keeping the cart up, sending it flying down the hill and across the line into a sand pile. The winning tribe receives chips, drinks and a croc-proof cage.; At the Reward Challenge, Jamie for Nakúm struggled to cut the ropes with a rock and Yaxhá easily won chips, drinks and a crocodile-proof swimming cage. After the loss, Stephenie tried to hide her depression from losing so many challenges. Before immunity in Nakúm, Lydia tried to cheer up her teammates by dancing.: Immunity Challenge: Each tribe divides into two groups of three, as well as one tribe member being left. The individual launches balls from a catapult towards the groups of three, who have a net to catch the balls between them. First tribe to catch five balls wins immunity.; Nakúm won immunity. Brian was in trouble because he knew that the numbers were against him. After all, it was 3 old Yaxhá vs 4 old Nakúm. Brandon believed with sticking with the tribal lines and refused to break his bonds with former tribemates. However, Blake was wearing on everybody's nerves by telling outlandish inappropriate stories of his partying days in Texas. Brian used his cunning to "Bait Blake" into telling these stories which obviously angered his tribemates. When it came down to tribal council the "Golden Boy" Blake was voted out. Brandon stuck to his word and voted for Brian.
158	6	"Big Balls, Big Mouth, Big Trouble"	October 20, 2005	17.78	6.1/17
At Yaxhá the tribe talked about the twist of Blake being voted off while in Nakúm, Margaret was feeling depressed due to being with Judd.: Reward Challenge: Tribes were split into pairs and one pair from each tribe competed to move a giant ball across the field and into their goal. First tribe to score three goals wins barbecue items, including a grill, burgers, beer and root beer, as well as the right to compete in an individual immunity challenge.; At the Reward Challenge, it was revealed that both tribes would be attending Tribal Council. Nakúm won their second challenge in a row.: Individual Challenge: The survivors race out to collect three bags of puzzle pieces, containing eleven letter tiles. First person to unscramble the phrase "Ancient Ruin" wins immunity and the chance to sit in on the other tribe's tribal council and assign individual immunity to someone on the other tribe.; As part of their reward, Nakúm competed in an individual Immunity Challenge, which was won by Rafe. He was also able to watch part of the Yaxhá tribal council. Before Tribal Council at Yaxhá, Brian lobbied his alliance to vote off Bobby Jon however Gary and Amy are unsure about it. At Nakúm, Judd's loud ego started to annoy several of his tribe mates. Nakúm went first to tribal council where Margaret and Judd faced off against each other trying to get the other voted off. In the end, Margaret, due to personality conflicts, was voted out of Nakúm, and at Yaxhá, Rafe gave Gary individual immunity and Brian was voted out, his tribemates perceiving him to be untrustworthy.
159	7	"Surprise Enemy Visit"	October 27, 2005	17.38	6.2/17
In Nakúm after tribal council, Judd was glad that Margaret got voted out.: Reward Challenge: Four tribe members were attached to poles by rope and had to spin to get out and unwind each castaway. The winning tribe receives chocolate and a jungle canopy zip-line trip.; Yaxhá won the reward of a jungle canopy zip-line ride and chocolate. Then, they invited Nakúm to camp for Danni's birthday. At first Nakúm was unsure, but they ended up going. They swam together in the croc-proof cage. Jamie and Cindy felt uncomfortable hanging out with Yaxhá.: Immunity Challenge: Tribes sent out one castaway at a time to dig up puzzle pieces in order to construct a Mayan calendar.; Nakúm won the Immunity Challenge. Afterwards in Yaxhá, they were unsure of whether to vote out Amy who was still suffering from the ankle injury that she had sustained in the second immunity challenge, or Bobby Jon who was threat due to his past experiences in Survivor. At Tribal Council, Yaxhá decided it was best to vote Amy out. After the vote, the four remaining Yaxhá moved to the Nakúm camp for the merger.
160	8	"The Hidden Immunity Idol"	November 3, 2005	18.28	6.6/17
After tribal council Nakúm was shocked to see that a merge was occurring. The next day, it was revealed in tree mail that there was a Hidden Immunity Idol located near the camp of the new Xhakúm tribe (formerly of Nakúm). The tribes merged into one and took the name Xhakúm.: Immunity Challenge: Survivors were to balance a clay pot on their head while standing on a small cube for as long as possible without touching the pot. After an hour, there was a tie breaker which involved the remaining players running up the steps of a Mayan temple with the pot balanced on their heads, with the first person to the top winning immunity. If no-one reached the top, the person who got furthest up the temple steps won.; At the Challenge, Jeff explained that it would be both for Reward and Immunity. However, only those who didn't feel they needed immunity would partake in the food reward while the others competed for immunity. Gary ended up winning the individual immunity via the tie breaker, in effect saving himself because the former Nakúm members (Cindy, Jamie, Judd, Lydia, Rafe, and Stephenie) decided to stick together and had been targeting Gary. During the challenge, Jamie said that Judd is doing the challenge to help his alliance and that made members from both sides mad. With Gary immune from the vote, Bobby Jon and Brandon were now on the chopping block, but Stephenie convinced her allies to keep Bobby Jon in the game, allowing him to at least make the Jury. They were stuck on voting either for Brandon, who is a threat, or Jamie who brushed many people the wrong way. In the end, Brandon, arguably the strongest player of the remaining Yaxhá members, was ousted.
161	9	"Secret and Lies and an Idol Surprise"	November 10, 2005	18.98	6.9/19
After tribal council, Jamie and Bobby Jon made up from last episode.: Reward Challenge: Survivors would use an atlatl to throw an arrow to the center of a target, closest to get the arrow to the pole wins a meal at the lodge, an open bar for the night and a choice of desserts, as well as a clue to the location of the hidden immunity idol.; Judd won the reward challenge. Jamie, who finished in fourth place in the challenge, volunteered to go last so everyone else goes up one place. At the reward, Judd's dish was lobster and steak while Jamie's was a bowl of Ramon Nuts and a glass of lake water. Judd shared some of his food with Bobby Jon and Stephenie, as well as granting them access to his free bar and dessert list. After reward, Jamie told his alliance that Gary was planning to vote him out but they weren't so sure of him.: Immunity Challenge: Obstacle course consisting of a balance beam whilst untying two planks, with the first four finishing moving on to a rope bridge, where the first two finishers competed in a two line balance bridge to win immunity.; Jamie won immunity. Gary, targeted for elimination by the dominant Nakúm alliance, surprised the tribe with the Idol at Tribal Council. With Gary safe from the vote once again, Bobby Jon was voted out instead and became the first member of the Jury.
162	10	"Eating and Sleeping with the Enemy"	November 17, 2005	18.82	6.4/17
Reward Challenge: Survivors are in teams of four, split into two pairs – one all male and one all-female – and race through a mud pit obstacle course and fill a pot with corn. The winning team receives a helicopter lift to a private home with an overnight stay including food, shower, coffee, and videos from home.; At the very messy reward challenge, the team of Danni, Gary, Judd, and Stephenie won a night away from camp and videos from home.: Immunity Challenge: Survivors were attached to ropes and go through an obstacle course manoeuvring themselves round the obstacles. The first four to finish moved onto the final round, which consisted of one obstacle, which was three levels high. First to finish won immunity.; Rafe won Immunity, edging out Cindy, and afterwards Jamie became increasingly paranoid about being voted out. Jamie wasn't originally the intended target that night, but his paranoia ended up annoying everyone else to the point where they made his worst nightmare come true, voting him out and making him the second member of the Jury.
163	11	"Everything Is Personal"	November 24, 2005	19.54	6.6/20
Reward Challenge: Each tribe member has three pots of corn and an answer cube. They are then asked questions on Mayan culture. Each question answered correctly allows them to smash one other tribe member's pot of corn. The last person standing wins a feast, waterfall pool and massage.; Cindy won the reward challenge, and took Rafe with her on a reward of a feast, waterfall pool and massage. Back at camp, Stephenie took exception to Lydia targeting her for winning too many rewards, and as a result, Lydia started becoming an outcast from her alliance.: Immunity Challenge: The tribe members first heard a story about a Mayan goddess, Ixchel. They then had to race to seven stations, each with a question about the story they heard. Each station had two options – one box contained a flag, one a stick. If they pulled a stick, they had to throw it into an urn and run back to the station to collect their flag. First to seven flags won immunity.; Rafe won Immunity again in a close finish against Gary, and at Tribal Council, the Nakúm alliance finally succeeded in eliminating Gary, despite his best efforts to turn the heat on Judd for lying about the whereabouts of the Hidden Immunity Idol.
164	12	"Price for Immunity"	December 1, 2005	19.82	7.0/21
Survivor Auction: Each contestant will be given $500 and can only bid with $20 increments. Highest bidder gets the item. Survivors may share money, but not with the item. The auction included food and drink items and overnight visits with a loved one would end without notice.; The final six's loved ones arrived at camp after the Survivor Auction. Danni won an Immunity Challenge advantage, and Judd's wife, Cindy's twin sister and Stephenie's boyfriend were permitted to stay overnight at camp. Stephenie promised Judd's wife she would have his back the remainder of the game at the reward challenge.: Immunity Challenge: The survivors competed on a multi-level board. They could move one space in any direction (not diagonally), flipping over tiles as they went along onto their red sides. When a tile is red, no-one can step onto it again. The middle platform spins, allowing relocation around the board. If you can't move, you're out. Last person standing wins immunity. Danni's advantage meant that she had a one-use power to switch players with anyone at any time.; As a result of using her advantage to switch places with Stephenie, Danni won the Immunity Challenge. Safe with immunity, Danni also succeeded in turning the game around for herself by convincing Lydia, Rafe, and Stephenie that Judd was untrustworthy and too much of a threat to keep around. Judd was voted out, but not before uttering a parting shot to the remaining contestants, quote: "Thanks guys. Hope you guys all get bit by a freakin' crocodile. Scumbags."
165	13	"Big Win, Big Decision, Big Mistake?"	December 8, 2005	20.21	7.1/19
Reward Challenge: The second chance challenge. First, the five survivors raced across a balance beam, untying three sets of war clubs. The first three to finish used the war clubs to try and break a tile 30 feet away. The first two to finish solved a puzzle based on the Maya calendar, hopped in a cart and used a machete to cut the rope keeping the cart up sending them down the hill to the finish. The winner receives a brand new 2006 Pontiac Torrent, which they can use to drive down to an archaeologist's camp, where a barbecue is set up, along with a place to spend the night.; After winning the Reward Challenge, Cindy was given the option of keeping her newly won 2006 Pontiac Torrent or giving one to each of the other remaining contestants. Cindy chose to keep the car, a decision which upset Rafe in particular. She chose to take Stephenie with her to the camp for the night on the reward, where they talked about voting out Danni next, as their alliance came into the merge with the numbers.: Immunity Challenge: The survivors begin with their hands and feet shackled, whilst attached to a long rope wrapped around a pole. They must use keys to unshackle their hands, their rope, their final key and use it to unlock their feet, whilst unwinding enough rope to be able to run to the finish and release their flag. First person to release their flag wins immunity.; After Stephenie won Immunity, Rafe successfully lobbied to get Cindy voted out.
166	14	"Thunder Storms & Sacrifice"	December 15, 2005	21.18	7.7/17
The final four were surprised on the morning on Day 37 by a visit by a family of Mayans, who showed them an ancient Mayan ritual, culminating in them sacrificing a chicken to the Mayan gods.: Immunity Challenge: The most complex Survivor maze so far, which consisted of six stations, containing eight puzzle pieces inside the maze. Once all eight pieces have been collected, the puzzle must then be solved by rotating the pieces until the ancient Mayan image of either a jaguar, crocodile or monkey is revealed. First person to reveal one of the images wins immunity.; At the first challenge, Rafe won his third individual immunity, and Lydia was voted out as a result of her popularity with the jury. On Day 38, the final three took part in the Rites of Passage walk, collecting images and the torches of the fallen fifteen, tossing them into the fire before proceeding to their final immunity challenge.: Immunity Challenge: The survivors stood on a small rotating platform with two ropes for their aid. After one hour, they had to release a rope. After 90 minutes, they had to go it alone, with their hands not allowed to touch anything to do with the challenge. The last person standing won.; After two hours, 38 minutes, Danni won the final immunity challenge. She chose to vote out Rafe, because she felt she would have a better chance in the final two against Stephenie. Stephenie was ripped into by the majority of the jury members for blatant lies, double crossing many, and switching around from various alliances on her way to the finals.
167	15	"The Reunion"	December 22, 2005	15.21	5.7/14
Months later, it was revealed that Danni beat Stephenie in a 6–1 vote. The castaways return to discuss the season with host, Jeff Probst.

== Voting history ==
	Original tribes			Switched tribes					Merged tribe							
Episode	1	2	3	4	5	6		7	8	9	10	11	12	13	14	
Day	3	6	8	11	14	15		18	21	24	27	30	33	36	37	38
Tribe	Nakúm	Yaxhá	Yaxhá	Nakúm	Yaxhá	Nakúm	Yaxhá	Yaxhá	Xhakúm	Xhakúm	Xhakúm	Xhakúm	Xhakúm	Xhakúm	Xhakúm	Xhakúm
Eliminated	Jim	Morgan	Brianna	Brooke	Blake	Margaret	Brian	Amy	Brandon	Bobby Jon	Jamie	Gary	Judd	Cindy	Lydia	Rafe
Votes	8–1	8–1	7–1	5–3	5–2	6–1	5–1	4–1	6–4	6–2–1	6–2	6–1	4–2	4–1	3–1	1–0
Voter	Vote															
Danni	Jim				Blake		Brian	Amy	Jamie	Stephenie	Jamie	Gary	Judd	Cindy	Lydia	Rafe
Stephenie		Morgan	Brianna	Brooke		Margaret			Brandon	Bobby Jon	Jamie	Gary	Judd	Cindy	Lydia	None (Note: Rafe and Stephenie were not eligible to vote as the only eligible players they could vote for were each other.)
Rafe		Morgan	Brianna	Brooke		Margaret			Brandon	Bobby Jon	Jamie	Gary	Judd	Cindy	Lydia	None
Lydia		Morgan	Brianna	Brooke		Margaret			Brandon	Bobby Jon	Jamie	Gary	Judd	Cindy	Danni	
Cindy	Jim			Lydia		Margaret			Brandon	Bobby Jon	Jamie	Gary	Lydia	Rafe		
Judd	Jim			Brooke		Margaret			Brandon	Bobby Jon	Gary	Gary	Lydia			
Gary		Morgan	Brianna		Blake		Brian	Amy	Jamie	Cindy	Jamie	Cindy				
Jamie		Morgan	Brianna	Brooke		Margaret			Brandon	Bobby Jon	Gary					
Bobby Jon	Jim				Blake		Brian	Amy	Jamie	Stephenie						
Brandon	Jim				Brian		Brian	Amy	Jamie							
Amy		Morgan	Brianna		Blake		Brian	Bobby Jon								
Brian		Morgan	Brianna		Blake		Bobby Jon									
Margaret	Jim			Lydia		Judd										
Blake	Jim				Brian											
Brooke	Jim			Lydia												
Brianna		Morgan	Lydia													
Morgan		Lydia														
Jim	Margaret															

Jury vote
Episode	15	
Day	39	
Finalist	Danni	Stephenie
Vote	6–1	
Juror	Vote	
Rafe		Yes
Lydia	Yes	
Cindy	Yes	
Judd	Yes	
Gary	Yes	
Jamie	Yes	
Bobby Jon	Yes	

== Casting ==
While the plan for the season always included two former castaways returning for a second chance, there were several discarded concepts and themes for these returnees. Rodger Bingham and Michael Skupin, both from Survivor: The Australian Outback, were in talks to be the returnees, as were Jonathan Libby and Wanda Shirk, both eliminated on day 2 of Survivor: Palau after not being selected to join a tribe. Skupin eventually returned in Survivor: Philippines. Additionally, Hunter Ellis from Marquesas allegedly turned down an offer to return.

== Reception ==
Survivor: Guatemala was met with a mixed reception by fans and critics. Particular criticism revolved around the social conduct of runner-up Stephenie LaGrossa, which was seen as a reversal from her heroic behavior in Survivor Palau. The gameplay of winner Danni Boatwright also received mixed to negative reception. Her strategy of not revealing her gameplay moves to the cameras at any point helped her to go far in the game, but rendered her relatively invisible until late in the game. Boatwright ranked placed 27th out of the first 34 winners in a fan poll conducted by Entertainment Weekly in 2017. Dalton Ross of Entertainment Weekly ranked this season 33rd out of 40 due to its unlikeable cast. In 2014, Joe Reid of The Wire ranked this season 15th out of 27. In 2015, a poll by Rob Has a Podcast ranked this season 21st out of 30 with Rob Cesternino ranking this season 13th. This was updated in 2021 during Cesternino's podcast, Survivor All-Time Top 40 Rankings, ranking 27th out of 40th. In 2020, Survivor fan site "Purple Rock Podcast" ranked this season 23rd out of 40. Later that same year, Inside Survivor ranked this season 25th out of 40 saying "it's neither horrible nor amazing. There are some great moments, ranging from the dramatic to the comedic. But sometimes those moments are forgotten due to what is relatively mediocre gameplay." In 2024, Nick Caruso of TVLine ranked this season 38th out of 47.
