= Rafe Judkins =

American screenwriter

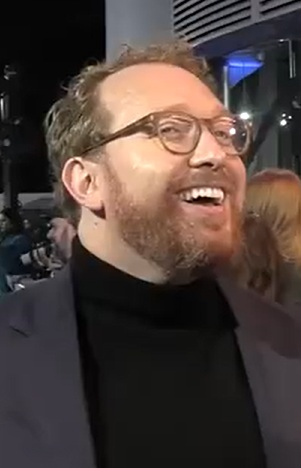
- Judkins at The Wheel of Time London Premiere 2021
- Born: Rafe Lee Judkins; January 8, 1982 (age 44); Salt Lake City, Utah, U.S.
- Occupations: Television writer, television producer, screenwriter

Rafe Lee Judkins (born January 8, 1983) is an American screenwriter and television producer. He was the showrunner for the Amazon Prime Video television series The Wheel of Time, has several writing credits for TV, and appeared as a contestant on the 11th season of Survivor, which took place in Guatemala.

== Early life ==
Judkins was born in Salt Lake City, Utah, to a large Mormon family. He attended Brown University.

== Survivor ==
Judkins participated in Survivor: Guatemala in 2005.

== Television career ==
After Survivor, Judkins moved to Los Angeles to pursue a career in screenwriting. He was staffed on the short-lived Christian Slater drama My Own Worst Enemy, and then was a writer on the third season of Chuck. After a stint on Hemlock Grove he began writing for Agents of S.H.I.E.L.D..

On April 20, 2017, it was announced that Judkins would be showrunning the TV adaptation of The Wheel of Time.

In May 2018, it was announced that Judkins was showrunning and writing The Last Amazons alongside director/executive producer Ava DuVernay, a television show about the real Amazon women in Ancient Greece.

Rafe Judkins, who was announced as showrunner and executive producer for Amazon's upcoming God of War TV series, departed the project in October 2024 due to creative differences. In 2026, he had signed an overall deal with Paramount Television Studios.

== Filmography ==
Year	Title	Credited as			Notes	Ref.
Year	Title	Writer	Producer	Other	Notes	Ref.
2005	Survivor: Guatemala	No	No	Yes	Contestant, finished in 3rd place	
2006	The 4400	No	No	Yes	Writers' assistant	
2006	Law & Order: Special Victims Unit	No	No	Yes	Script coordinator	
2008	My Own Worst Enemy: Conspiracy Theory	Yes	No	No	Wrote: "Dementia"	
2008	My Own Worst Enemy	Yes	No	Yes	Staff writer, wrote 2 episodes	
2010–12	Chuck	Yes	No	Yes	Wrote 11 episodes Also story editor and executive story editor	
2013	Hemlock Grove	Yes	Yes	No	Co-producer, wrote: "What Peter Can Live Without"	
2013–15	Agents of S.H.I.E.L.D.	Yes	Yes	No	Wrote 5 episodes Supervising producer and producer	
2019	Honor	Yes	Executive	No	Short film	
2021–25	The Wheel of Time	Yes	Executive	Yes	Developer	
2022	Uncharted	Yes	No	No	Screenplay and story by	
