= Stephania Bell =

American author and sports commentator

- Born: May 20, 1966 (age 60)
- Education: Princeton University (AB); University of Miami (MS)
- Occupations: Sports journalist, sports commentator, radio host

Stephania Bell (born May 20, 1966) is an American physical therapist who has become an author. She is a former on-air and online sports commentator at ESPN where she served as an American football injury analyst.

== Early life and education ==
Bell is from San Francisco, California, and she graduated from The Madeira School which is located in McLean, Virginia although she claims Mountain View, California as her home town. Bell earned her A.B. from Princeton University in 1987, where as a French major her senior thesis was about La Comédie humaine by Honoré de Balzac. At Princeton, she worked in the athletic training department. She also earned a Master of Science in physical therapy from the University of Miami in 1991. She held a teaching position at the University of Kansas for five years.

== Career ==
Bell formerly served as an injury analyst for KFFL, RotoWire and XM Radio. Hired in 2007, she actively blogs National Football League injury analysis for ESPN where she is a regular columnist. Bell complements on-air journalists with analysis of breaking news. She serves as a co-host of Fantasy Focus on ESPN Radio and an analyst for SportsNation on ESPN.com. She co-authored The Clinical Orthopedic Assessment Guide. Bell is a board-certified orthopedic clinical specialist and a certified strength and conditioning specialist. Since September 2008, Bell has had a residence in Connecticut near the ESPN studios. Bell is a member of the American Physical Therapy Association, and her ESPN blogs are cross-posted on their website.

At the suggestion of a friend she began blogging about football injuries. Her fantasy league commissioner advised her that her expertise might be marketable. Although pro teams are somewhat vague about players' injuries, Bell uses her experience to review videos of players' injuries, check their injury histories, and determine their training activities. Then in consultation with orthopedic surgeons she produces educated predictions about future player activity. In addition to commenting on NFL athletes, Bell has blogged about the injuries of star athletes in other sports such as Tiger Woods and Alex Rodriguez.

Bell was laid off from ESPN in July 2026 as part of a mass layoff.
