= Nate Ravitz =

American online sports editor

Nate Ravitz is the Senior Vice President of Digital Content at ESPN. He was previously deputy editor for ESPN.com Fantasy, which focuses on fantasy sports. Apart from his internal duties for ESPN, Ravitz was best known as the co-host (along with Matthew Berry) of the Fantasy Focus Football Podcast. He used to host the Fantasy Baseball podcast as well, but he stepped down after the 2013 season. Ravitz then retired from the Fantasy Focus Football Podcast in 2014, and was replaced by Field Yates. He also used to provide analysis for the Fantasy Focus video Podcast, as well as other written analysis for ESPN.com.

== Career ==
Ravitz began working in fantasy sports as a part-time sports writer for Total Quality Stats in 1998 and went on to found the website Roto Times, where he served as the executive director. He was eventually lured to ESPN. Ravitz's most public work with ESPN has been as co-host of fantasy football-themed podcast with Matthew Berry. While the shows are based on fantasy football, popular culture topics as well as personal stories make up a large portion of each show. The podcast features recurring themes. He used to host a baseball themed "Fantasy Focus" podcast with Berry, Eric Karabell, and Tristan H. Cockcroft, however, he and Berry both stepped down after the 2013 season.

On November 6, 2014, Ravitz announced that he would step down from the Fantasy Focus Football podcast at the end of the 2014 NFL season.

== Personal ==
Ravitz graduated from the University of Michigan with a Bachelor of Arts degree in English in 1999.
