= Mike Beacom =

American writer

Mike Beacom is a professional and college football writer, and the former president and chairman of the Fantasy Sports Writers Association (FSWA).

== Pro and college football writer ==
Beacom writes a regular retro column for Pro Football Weekly and has contributed to SI.com’s fantasy football section since 2006. He has also covered Big Ten football for a number of national outlets, including Lindy’s, Athlon and CSTV (now CBS Sports).

== Football history ==
Much of Beacom’s work has been focused on historical themes. In 2006, Beacom researched all of the past Super Bowl MVP winners and offered alternative choices for each game based on insight he received from leading NFL experts. The article was recognized as one of the year’s best articles by the Pro Football Writers of America. Two years later Beacom wrote a piece for SI.com picking the winners of the Heisman races from 1900 to 1934 (the 35 years before the trophy was established) based on research he had conducted.

== Fantasy Sports Writers Association (FSWA) ==
Beacom was asked to serve as the group’s chairman when it was created in 2004. On January 1, 2008, he assumed the duties of president, and during his term he has helped to launch the FSWA Hall of Fame, which recognizes those writers, editors and publishers who have made a lasting impact on the fantasy sports industry. Wrote ESPN’s Matthew Berry in 2010 of the honor, “Very humbling for me. Thrilled, honored, touched and many other emotions raced through me.”

== Author ==
Beacom has penned several books, including “The Complete Idiot's Guide to Understanding Football,” which was released by Alpha Books in 2010.

== Personal ==
Beacom resides with his family in central Wisconsin where he serves as an associate lecturer of journalism at a nearby university. He is a graduate of the University of Wisconsin–Stevens Point where he was a Communication major and awards an annual scholarship to students who excel in internships or employment.

== Awards and recognition ==
• Author of the Best Wisconsin Sports Story of 2009, Milwaukee Press Club

• Runner-up, Best Wisconsin Sports Story of 2010, Milwaukee Press Club

• Runner-up, Best Enterprise Feature, Pro Football Writers of America
