= Tristan H. Cockcroft =

American sports writer and podcast host

Tristan H. Cockcroft is an American writer for ESPN.com and co-host of the ESPN Fantasy Focus Baseball Podcast with Eric Karabell. Cockcroft graduated from the College of New Jersey.

== Career ==
Tristan H. Cockcroft is a senior writer for ESPN.com and co-host of the ESPN Fantasy Focus Baseball Podcast with Eric Karabell. Cockcroft is a two time LABR (League of Alternative Baseball Reality) and two-time TOUT wars champion. Cockcroft was inducted to the Fantasy Sports Writer Hall of Fame in 2012.

== Fantasy Focus Podcast ==
=== Cousin of the Podcast ===
Prior to taking over as co-host of the Fantasy Focus Baseball Podcast from Matthew Berry and Nate Ravitz Cockcroft was a frequent contributor, to the extent that he earned the nickname "Cousin of the Podcast." Often taking the role of analyst alongside Ravitz, Cockcroft's fondness to calling player "streaky" was made famous by an oft-used drop on the show.

=== And Sometimes Karabell and Cockcroft ===
In 2013, Karabell and Cockcroft took over as co-hosts of the Friday edition of Fantasy Focus Baseball Podcasts. The change led Podcast theme songwriter Eric Hutchinson to produce a modified version of the theme song to be played on days when Cockcroft and Karabell hosted the show.

=== Co-Host of Fantasy Focus Baseball Podcast ===
On January 28, 2014, the era of Cockcroft and Karabell as full-time hosts of the Fantasy Focus Baseball Podcast began.

=== League Formerly Known as the Man's League ===
Cockcroft and Karabell are hosts of "The Man's League," a fantasy baseball league in which the listeners of the show play against Cockcroft, Karabell, and the show's producer, Jay Soderberg (aka Pod Vader). The "Man's League" was originally named as such due to the high number of team owners the league has, requiring participants to be knowledgeable of lesser known professional baseball players to be competitive. As of March 7, 2014, Cockcroft and Karabell have yet to officially announce the name of the league formerly known as the Man's League. However, they have indicated that admission to said league will be determined by Cockcroft, Karabell, and Soderberg on the simple basis of whether a listener's email can impress them.

=== Geeky Stat of the Day ===
One addition to the show brought by Cockcroft in the 2014 season is the Geeky Stat of the Day. During this segment of the show Cockcroft delivers an arcane stat that he expects will be useful to listeners as they evaluate their own fantasy teams.
