= Better Farming =

Monthly newspaper

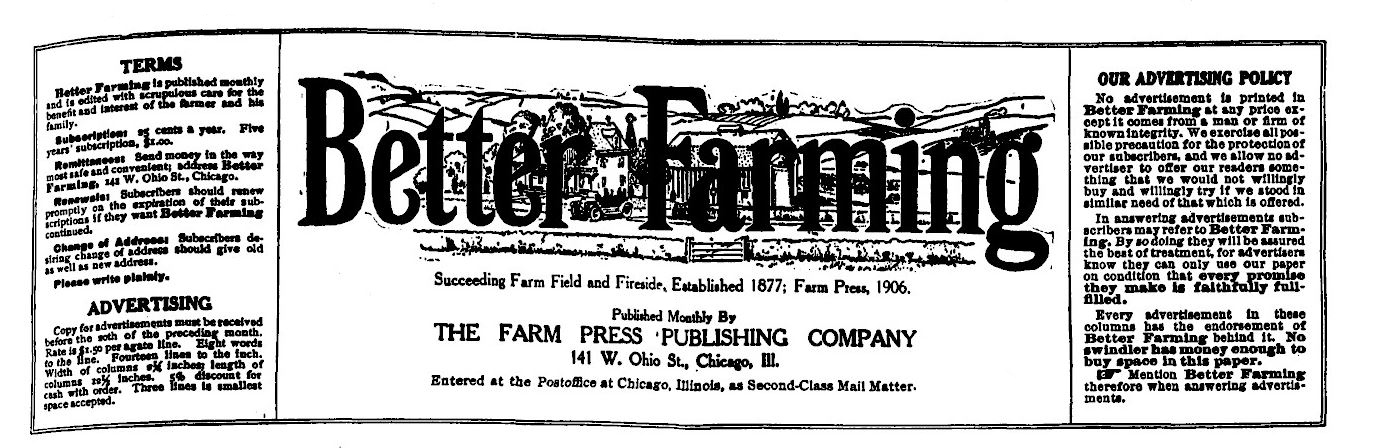
- Better Farming masthead (1913)
- Type: Monthly newspaper
- Founded: 1913; 112 years ago
- Headquarters: Chicago, Illinois
- Country: United States

Better Farming was a monthly newspaper from the early 20th century that originated in Chicago, Illinois. It provided information about best practices in agriculture and housekeeping. Along with farming advice, fiction and nonfiction pieces, and advertisements, it offered articles for children as well.

Better Farming succeeded Farm, Field, and Fireside (1877) and Farm Press (1906).

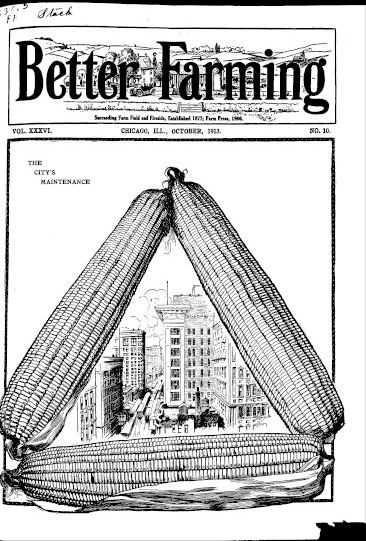
Cover of the October 1, 1913 issue of Better Farming
