= Illinois Farmer =

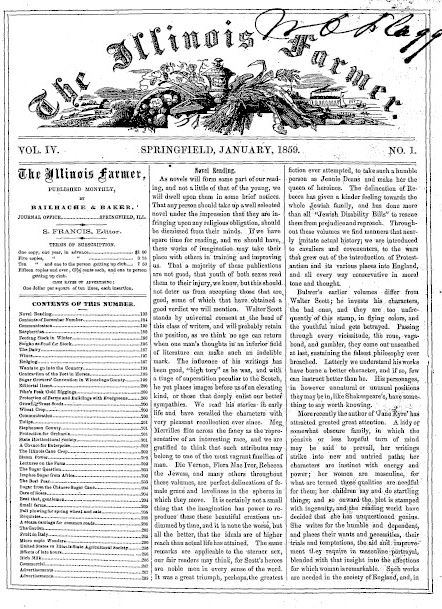
- Type: Monthly newspaper
- Owner(s): Bailhache and Baker
- Founded: 1856
- Headquarters: Springfield, Illinois

Illinois Farmer was a monthly farming newspaper started in the early 1856 and edited by S. Francis in Springfield, Illinois. and continued to sometime around 1863. It was considered under the "umbrella" of Farm, Field, and Fireside newspapers. Its masthead proclaimed that the newspaper was devoted to the farm, the orchard, and the garden. It was published by Bailhache and Baker. Its editor was M.L. Dunlap
