= The Western Rural and American Stockman =

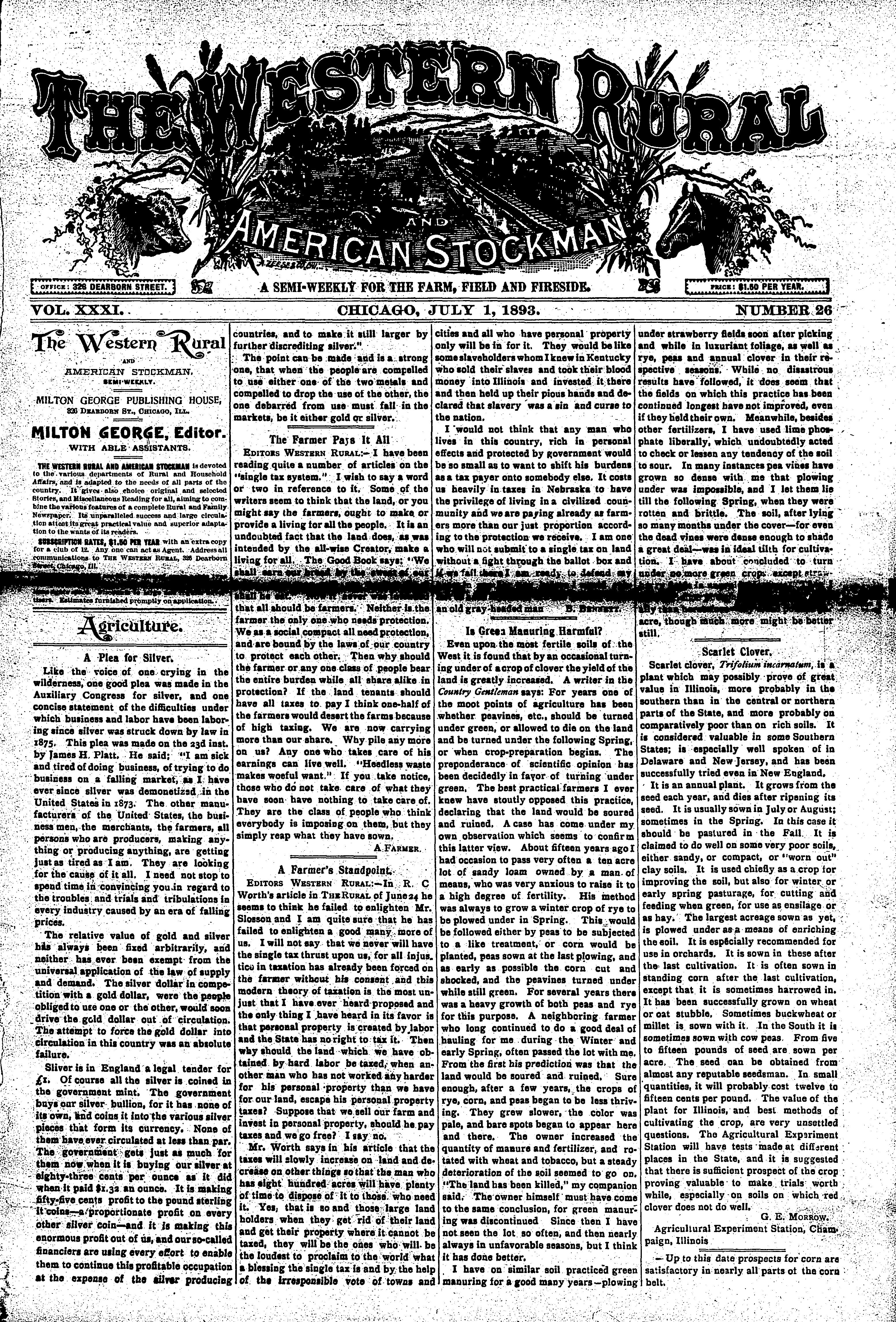
- Type: Semi-weekly newspaper
- Format: Broadsheet
- Editor: Milton George
- Founded: 1883-1895
- Headquarters: Chicago, Illinois

The Western Rural and American Stockman (1883-1895) was a semi-weekly newspaper published in Chicago, Illinois. It published articles about agriculture, livestock, and farm life in the United States during the late 19th century. Its editor was Milton George. It was associated with the Farm, Field, and Fireside collective of newspapers.
