= Farm, Field, and Stockman =

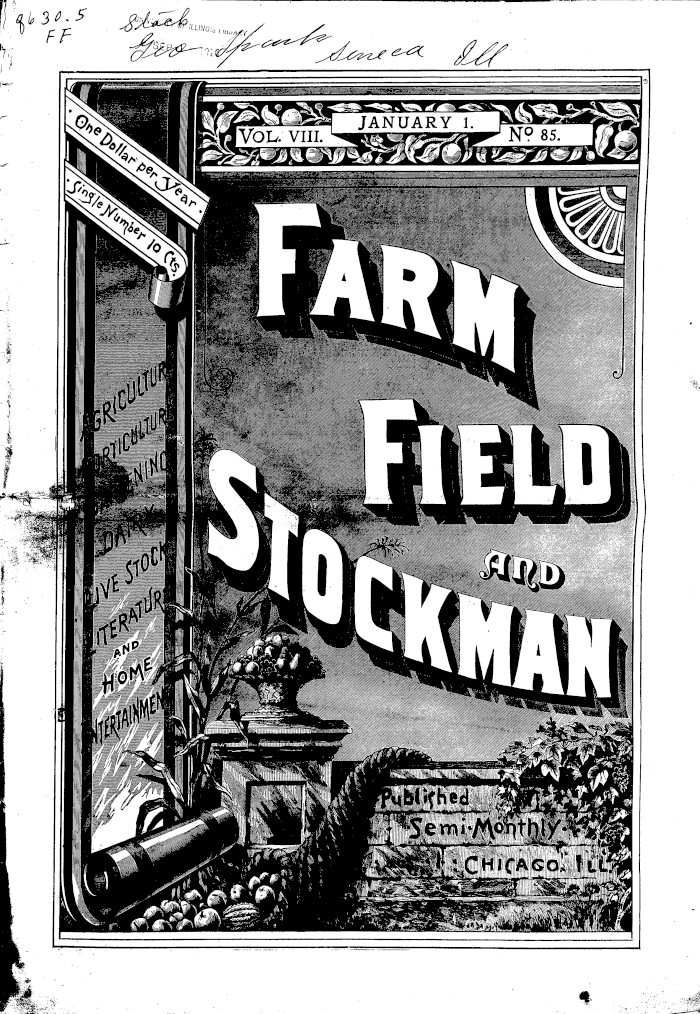
- Farm, Field, and Stockman (January 1, 1885)
- Type: Weekly newspaper
- Editor: Charles Henry Howard
- Founded: 1884
- Headquarters: Chicago, Illinois

Farm, Field, and Stockman was a weekly American newsletter published in 1884 in the Farm, Field, and Fireside family of farming and home newsletters. Its slogan was: "Agriculture, Gardening, Livestock, and Home Literature." It was merged in 1901 with Chicago, Illinois newspaper Model Farmer and became Farm, Field, Stockman and Model Farmer. After the merger, the newsletter was again combined with Wisconsin Agriculturalist in 1902.
