= Nez Perce National Historic Trail =

Historic trail in the northwestern United States

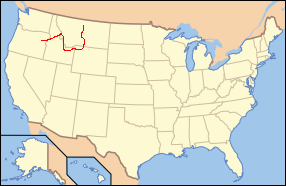
- Interactive map of Nez Perce National Historic Trail
- Location: Oregon, Idaho, Wyoming, Montana, USA
- Nearest city: Lewiston, ID
- Coordinates: 46°8′31″N 116°21′34″W
- Established: 1986
- Governing body: U.S. Forest Service
- Website: Nez Perce National Historic Trail

The Nez Perce (Nee-Me-Poo) National Historic Trail follows the route taken by a large group of people of the Nez Perce tribe in 1877 to avoid being forced onto a reservation. The 1,170-mile (1,883 km) trail was created in 1986 as part of the National Trails System Act and is managed by the U.S. Forest Service. The trail passes through portions of the U.S. states of Oregon, Idaho, Wyoming, and Montana. It connects sites across these states to commemorate significant events of the Nez Perce War, which took place between June and October 1877 as several bands of Nez Perce tried to evade the U.S. Cavalry and escape to Canada. The sites are among the 38 that are collectively managed by the U.S. National Park Service as part of the Nez Perce National Historical Park, though some sites are individually managed by local or state-affiliated organizations.

== History ==
The trail approximates the route followed by a band of 750 Nez Perce warriors and civilians, including women, children, and elders, as they tried to resist U.S. Army efforts to confine them within federal reservation lands in Idaho. The Nez Perce were parties to the 1855 Treaty of Walla Walla with the U.S. Government, but in 1877 were being forced to give up more land than had originally been demanded, in violation of the treaty. Attempting to escape across the border to Canada, where the U.S. Army had no authority, they fought numerous engagements with the 7th Cavalry in the summer of 1877. Their maneuvers evolved as their objectives changed. First, they were fleeing some episodes of violence that erupted during their initial relocation to a smaller reservation; next, trying to evade the 7th Cavalry and reach a territory of the US where they could continue their traditional lifestyle; finally, trying to escape to Canada.

Beginning near Wallowa Lake in eastern Oregon, the Nez Perce headed east into Idaho. After the Battle of White Bird Canyon they crossed Lolo Pass into Montana and fought a major battle at what is now known as Big Hole National Battlefield. After that, the Nez Perce continued traveling south and east, back into Idaho and then into Wyoming entering Yellowstone National Park near West Yellowstone, Montana. The tribe left the park crossing Sylvan Pass and followed the Clarks Fork River back into Montana. From there the Nez Perce headed almost straight north for Canada and almost made it. The Nez Perce were near starvation and exhaustion after fighting their last battle north of the Bear Paw Mountains, less than 40 miles (64 km) from the Canada–US border, when they surrendered to U.S. authorities. Chief Joseph is widely credited with leading the Nez Perce on this journey. He served as a camp supervisor and guardian, who was entrusted with handling the logistics of camp and travel, and taking care of the women and children.

At the time of the surrender, Chief Joseph was the most prominent surviving leader among the group; he decided it was time to surrender. A few members of the tribe did reach Canada, but the vast majority were relocated to Kansas and Oklahoma for eight years before being allowed to relocate to the reservation in Idaho, closer to their ancestral home.

== Trail description ==
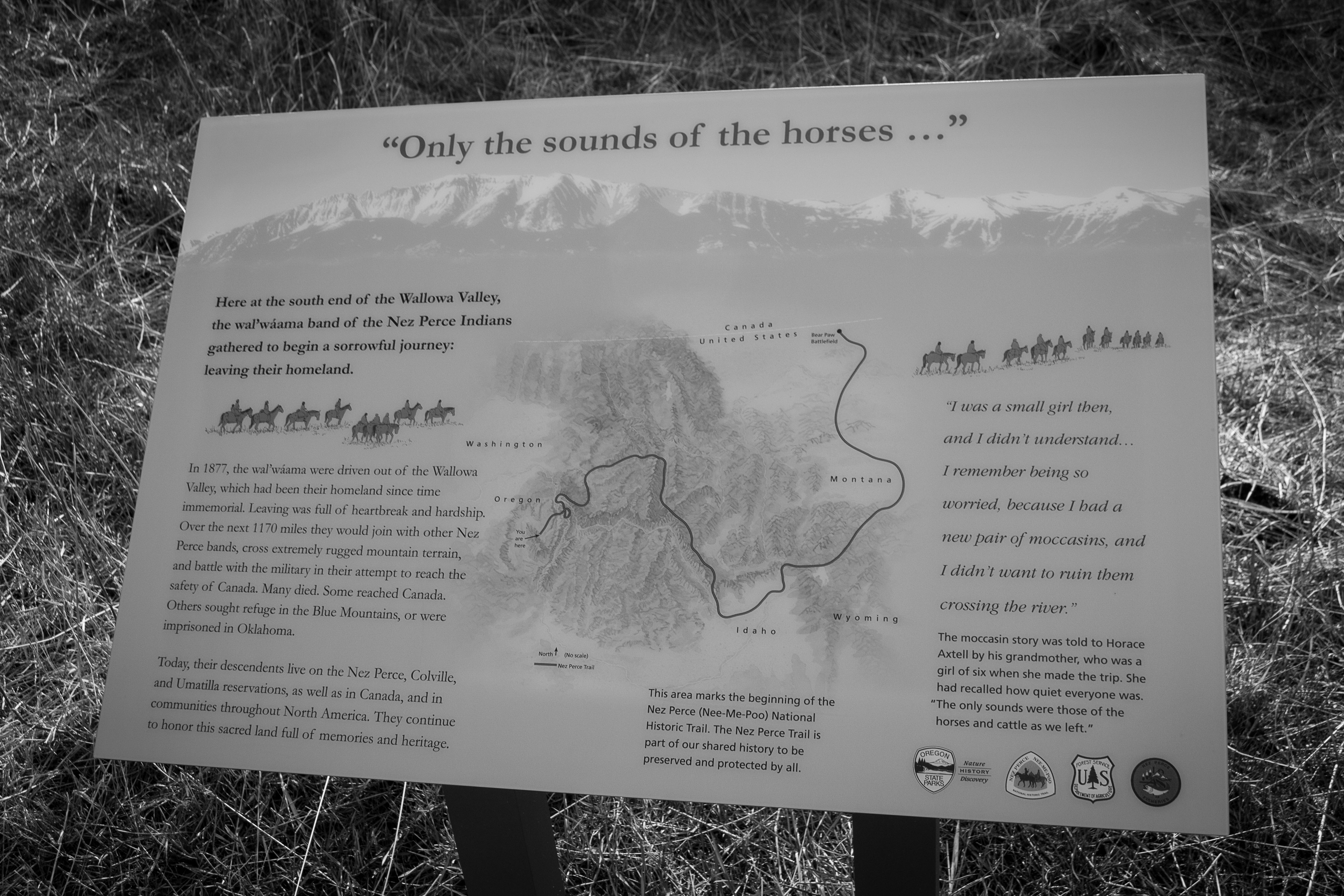
Nez Perce National Historic Trail reader board

The trail passes through numerous National Park Service managed areas, National Forests, and Bureau of Land Management Public Lands. While Oregon was already a state, the other three states the trail now passes through were still territories. None of the forest lands were managed by the federal government, but Yellowstone National Park was created 5 years before the Nez Perce journey. The trail also passes through privately owned property and it is best advised to obtain permission to enter these areas from local landowners. Little of the trail is actually a foot trail although much of the journey can be closely followed by roads. Attempts are underway to continue to preserve right of way to allow greater access for visitors.

The Chief Joseph Trail Ride takes place annually and follows the historic trail.

== See also ==
- Nez Perce National Historical Park
