= Charles Henry Howard =

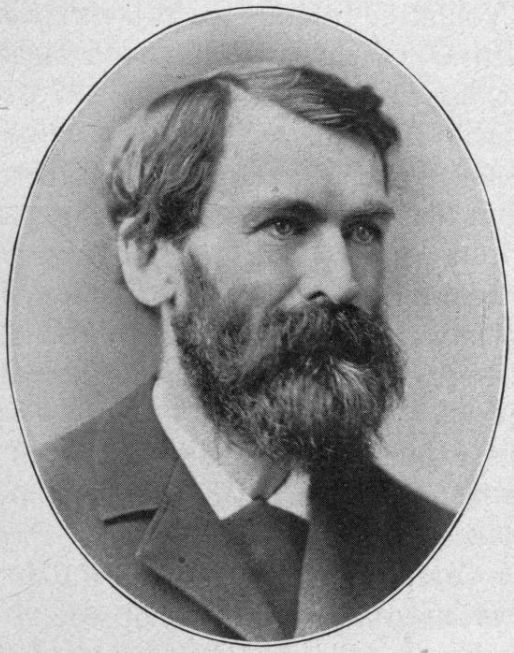
- Born: August 28, 1838; Leeds, Maine
- Died: January 27, 1908 (aged 69); Glencoe, Illinois
- Burial place: Rosehill Cemetery, Chicago, Illinois
- Military career
- Allegiance: United States of America; Union
- Branch: Union Army
- Service years: 1861–1866
- Rank: Colonel; Brevet Brigadier General
- Unit: 3rd Maine Infantry Regiment
- Commands: 128th U.S. Colored Infantry Regiment
- Conflicts: American Civil War: First Battle of Bull Run; Battle of Seven Pines; Battle of Antietam; Battle of Fredericksburg; Battle of Chancellorsville; Battle of Gettysburg; Battles for Chattanooga; Atlanta campaign; March to the Sea
- Other work: Freedmen's Bureau official, newspaper editor and publisher, school inspector, governmental inspector

Charles Henry Howard (August 28, 1838 – January 27, 1908) was an officer in the Union Army during the American Civil War, and a newspaper editor and publisher. He was the younger brother of Union general Oliver O. Howard.

== Early life ==
Howard was born in Leeds, Maine, on August 28, 1838. He attended Kent's Hill School and North Yarmouth Academy. He graduated from Bowdoin College in Brunswick, Maine, in 1859 and then attended the Bangor Theological Seminary for one year before enlisting for the Civil War.

== Civil War ==
Howard enlisted as a private and musician in the 3rd Maine Infantry in June 1861, upon the request of his brother Oliver O. Howard, and saw action at the First Battle of Bull Run. He was commissioned a second lieutenant in the 61st New York Infantry on January 24, 1862, and served during the Peninsula Campaign, where he was wounded during the Battle of Seven Pines at Fair Oaks, Virginia. He fought at the Battle of Antietam and was wounded again in the Battle of Fredericksburg. In 1863, he was promoted to major and aide-de-camp to his older brother Oliver and served with him at the battles of Chancellorsville and Gettysburg. He and his brother's corps were transferred to Tennessee and fought in the Battles for Chattanooga. He was promoted to lieutenant colonel and assistant inspector general in May 1864, and to colonel in March 1865.

Howard also commanded the United States Colored Troops training camp at Beaufort, South Carolina, as well as the 128th U.S.C.T. Infantry Regiment. He was promoted to brevet brigadier general on August 15, 1865.

== Postbellum career ==
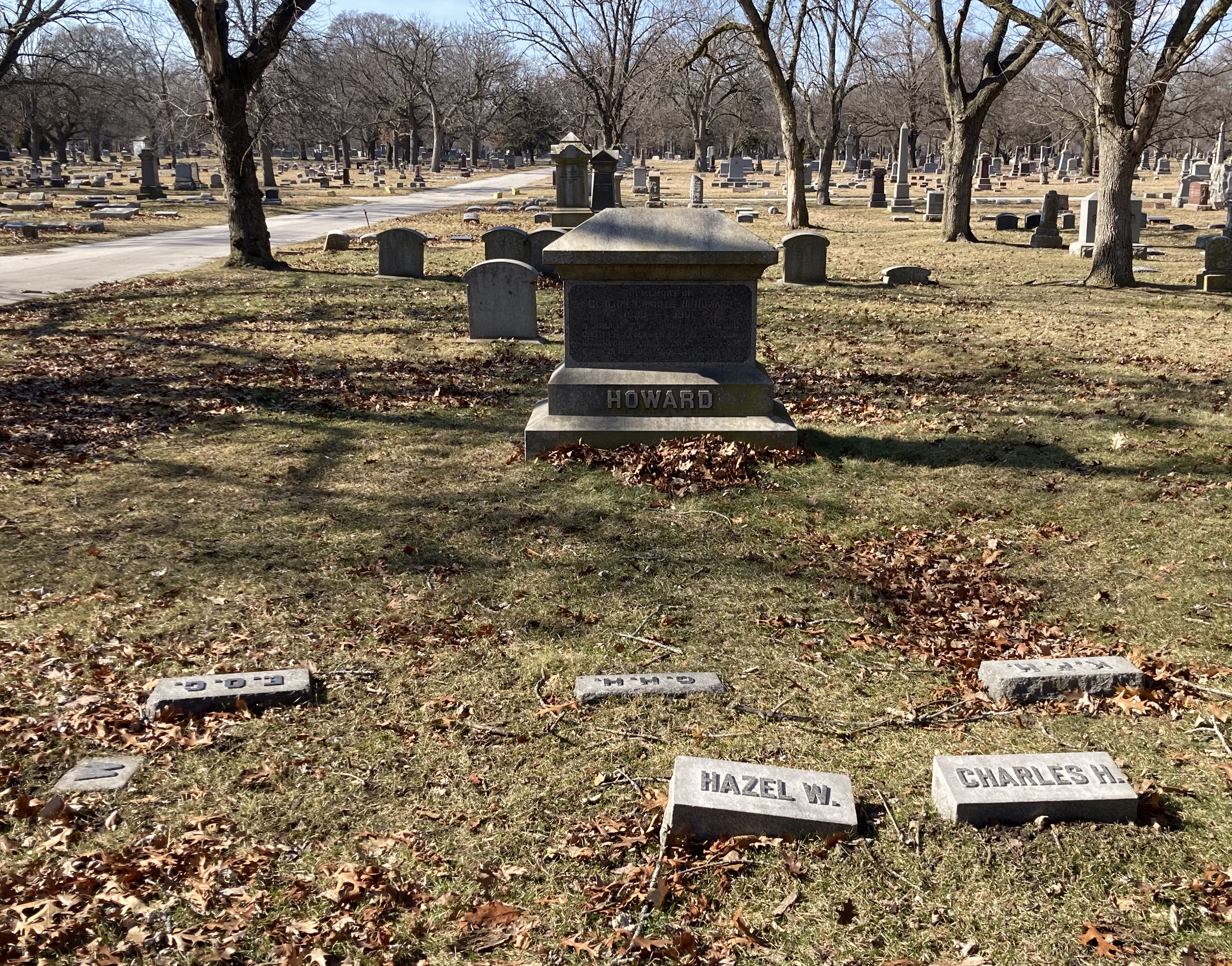
Howard's grave at Rosehill Cemetery

Following the war, Howard served in the Bureau of Refugees, Freedmen and Abandoned Lands (the "Freedmen's Bureau"). He also became Inspector of Schools for South Carolina, Georgia, and Florida, and Assistant Commissioner for the District of Columbia, Maryland, and Virginia. Brigadier General Howard, as an inspector in the Freedmen's Bureau, testified on January 31, 1866, before the U.S. Congress’ Joint Committee on Reconstruction on the condition of and prognosis for the freedmen in South Carolina, Georgia, and Florida, and about the attitudes and intentions of the people toward the United States and toward the freedmen. His remarks were published in the Report of the Joint Committee on Reconstruction dated January 1, 1866. His remarks at the hearing were printed in the March 12, 1866, issue of the New York Tribune.

Howard was for five years the Western Secretary of the American Missionary Association. He also served as editor-in-chief of the Advance, a Congregational journal (1871–1881) and controlling editor of Farm, Field, and Stockman, later Farm, Field, and Fireside (1885–1905). He was briefly Western Editor and Business Manager of the National Tribune (1885). Howard continued to hold special government appointments in his later life, including Government Inspector of Indian Agencies under Presidents James A. Garfield and Chester A. Arthur.

Howard married Mary Catherine Foster of Bangor, Maine in 1867 and had five sons and two daughters.

He died in Glencoe, Illinois on January 27, 1908, and was buried at Rosehill Cemetery in Chicago.

== See also ==
- Oliver Otis Howard (brother)
