= Farm Press =

Farm Press (an illustrated farming journal) was a monthly farming-centered newspaper published out of Chicago, Illinois in the early 20th century. As expressed on the masthead, Farm Press succeeded the newspaper Farm, Field, and Fireside, and was combined with the newspaper Farm Folks. The slogan of the newspaper was "Devoted to the welfare of the farmer and his family."

Farm Press offered advice to readers about farming practices including livestock raising, farm machinery, planting/harvesting crops, and dairy farming. It also published stories, articles for homemaking, and a section for children.

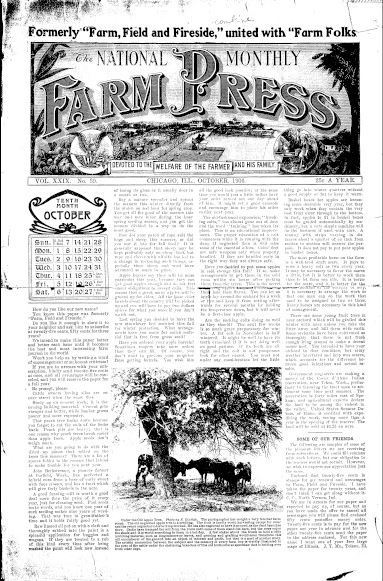
Front page of Farm Press (October 1, 1906)
