= Oliver Otis Howard =

American army general (1830–1909)

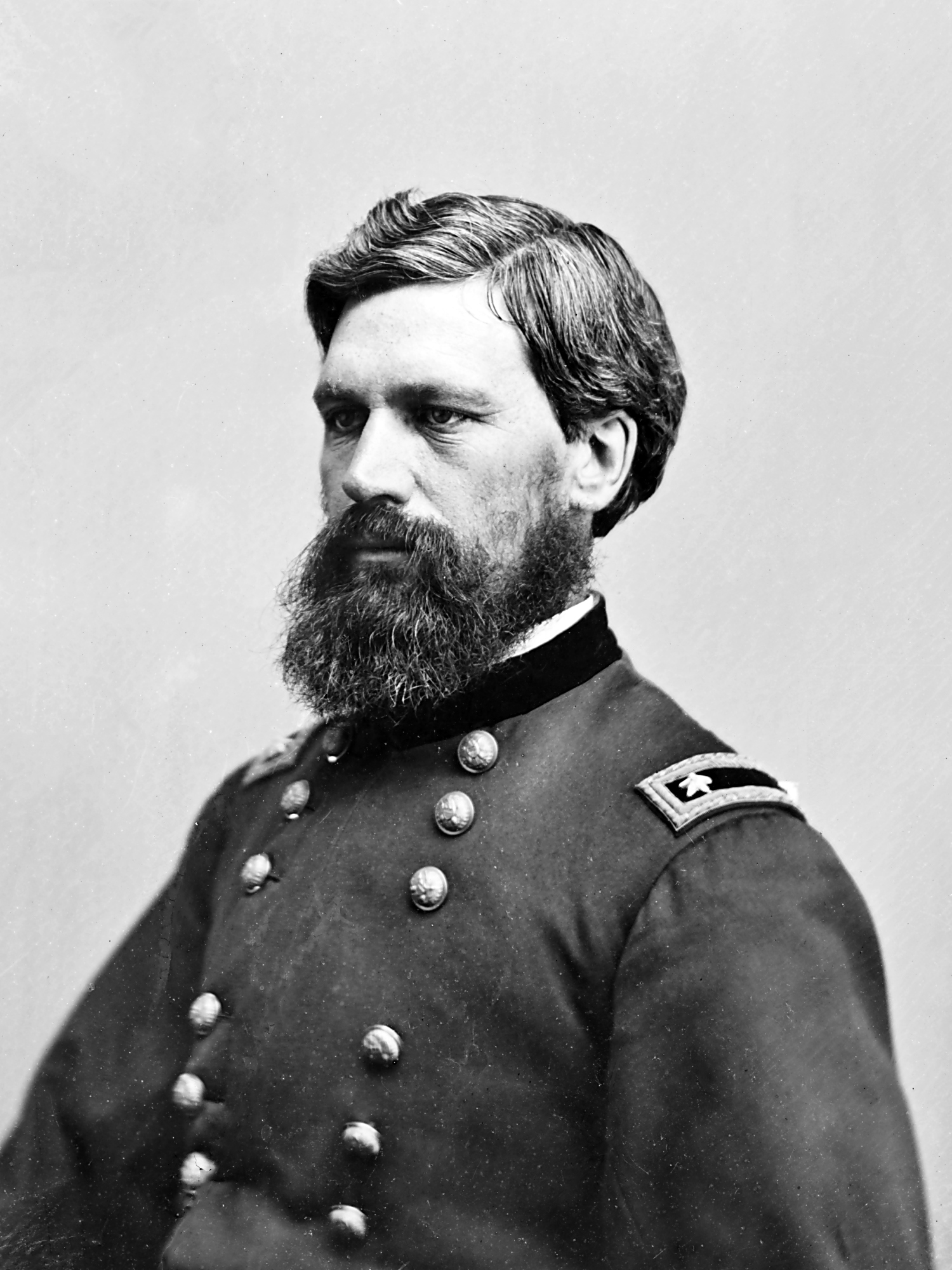
- Howard during the Civil War
- Born: November 8, 1830; Leeds, Maine, U.S.
- Died: October 26, 1909 (aged 78); Burlington, Vermont, U.S.
- Burial place: Lakeview Cemetery, Burlington, Vermont
- Education: Bowdoin College; West Point
- Military career
- Allegiance: United States (Union)
- Branch: United States Army; Union Army
- Service years: 1854–1894
- Rank: Major General
- Nicknames: The Christian General; Old Prayer Book
- Commands: 3rd Maine Infantry Regiment; 1st Brigade, 1st Division, II Corps; 2nd Brigade, 2nd Division, II Corps; 2nd Division, II Corps; XI Corps; IV Corps; Army of the Tennessee; Freedmen's Bureau; United States Military Academy
- Conflicts: Seminole Wars; American Civil War; First Battle of Bull Run; Battle of Seven Pines; Battle of Antietam; Battle of Chancellorsville; Battle of Gettysburg; Chattanooga campaign; Atlanta campaign; Sherman's March to the Sea; Carolinas campaign; American Indian Wars; Nez Perce War
- Awards: Thanks of Congress; Medal of Honor
- Other work: President, Howard University; Managing Director, Lincoln Memorial University

Oliver Otis Howard (November 8, 1830 – October 26, 1909) was a career United States Army officer and a Union general in the Civil War. As a brigade commander in the Army of the Potomac, Howard lost his right arm while leading his men against Confederate forces at the Battle of Fair Oaks/Seven Pines in June 1862, an action which later earned him the Medal of Honor. As a corps commander, he suffered a major defeat at Chancellorsville and his performance was questioned at Gettysburg in May and July 1863. However, he recovered from possible career setbacks as a successful corps and later army commander, commanding the Army of the Tennessee from July 27, 1864, until May 19, 1865, leading the army in the battles of Ezra Church, Battle of Jonesborough, Sherman's March to the Sea, and the Carolinas campaign in the Western Theater.

Known as the "Christian General" because he tried to base his policy decisions on his deep, evangelical piety, he was given charge of the Freedmen's Bureau in mid-1865, with the mission of integrating the former slaves into Southern society and politics during the second phase of the Reconstruction Era. Howard took charge of labor policy, setting up a system that required freed people to work on former plantation land under pay scales fixed by the Bureau, on terms negotiated by the Bureau with white land owners. Howard's Bureau was primarily responsible for the legal affairs of the freedmen. He attempted to protect freed Black people from hostile conditions but lacked adequate power and was repeatedly frustrated by President Andrew Johnson.

Howard's allies the Radical Republicans won control of Congress in the 1866 elections and imposed Radical Reconstruction, with the result that freedmen were given the vote. With the help and advice of the Bureau, freedmen joined Republican coalitions and won at the ballot boxes of most of the southern states. Howard was also a leader in promoting higher education for freedmen, most notably in founding Howard University in Washington, D.C., of which he is the namesake. He served as its president from 1867 to 1873, and he aided in the charter of both Howard University and Atlanta University (now Clark Atlanta University) in 1867.

After 1874, Howard commanded troops in the West, conducting a famous campaign against the Nez Perce tribe, led by Chief Joseph. Utley (1987) concludes that his leadership against the Apaches in 1872, Nez Perce in 1877, Bannocks and Paiutes in 1878, and the Sheepeaters in 1879 all add up to a lengthy record, although he did not fight as much as George Custer or Nelson Miles.

== Early years ==
Oliver Howard was born in Leeds, Maine, the son of Rowland Bailey Howard and Eliza Otis Howard. His great-grandfather, Rogers Stinchfield and great-granduncle Thomas Stinchfield founded Leeds. Rowland, a farmer, died when Oliver was 9 years old. Oliver attended Monmouth Academy in Monmouth, North Yarmouth Academy in Yarmouth, Kents Hill School in Readfield, and graduated from Bowdoin College in 1850 at the age of 19. He then attended the United States Military Academy, graduating in 1854, fourth in his class of 46 cadets, as a brevet second lieutenant of ordnance. He served at the Watervliet Arsenal near Troy, New York, and was the temporary commander of the Kennebec Arsenal in Augusta, Maine. In 1855, he married Elizabeth Anne Waite, with whom he would have seven children. In 1857, he was transferred to Florida for the Seminole Wars. It was in Florida that he experienced a conversion to Evangelical Christianity and considered resigning from the Army to become a minister. His religious proclivities would later earn him the nickname "the Christian general". Howard was promoted first lieutenant in July 1857, and returned to West Point the following September to become an instructor of mathematics. As the Civil War began with the surrender of Fort Sumter, thoughts of the ministry were put aside and he decided to remain in the service of his country.

== Civil War ==
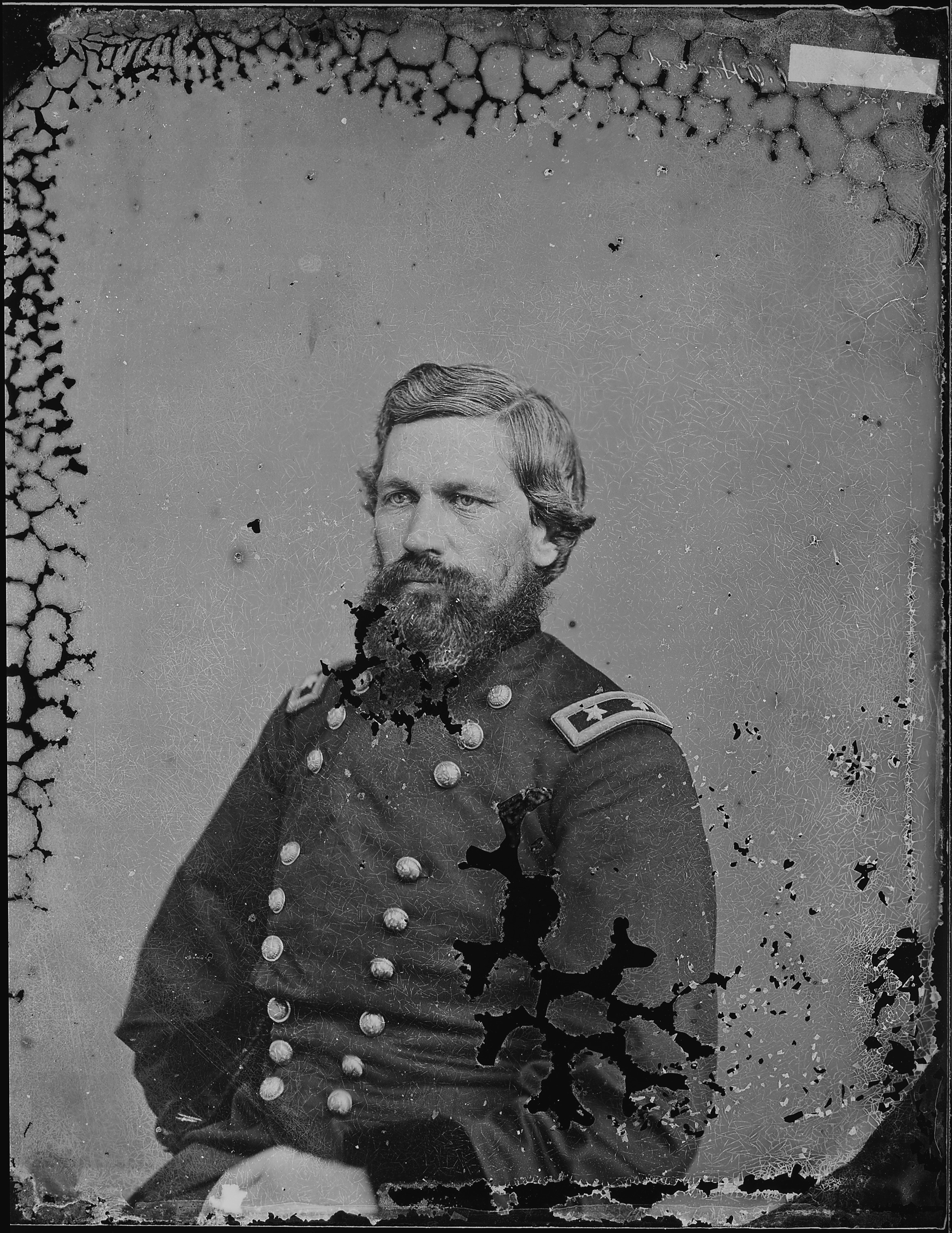
Maj. Gen. Oliver Otis Howard c. 1862-1864

Howard was appointed colonel of the 3rd Maine Infantry regiment and temporarily commanded a brigade at the First Battle of Bull Run. He was promoted to brigadier general effective September 3, 1861, and given permanent command of his brigade. He then joined Maj. Gen. George B. McClellan's Army of the Potomac for the Peninsula Campaign.

On June 1, 1862, while commanding a Union brigade in the Fair Oaks, Howard was wounded twice in his right arm, which was subsequently amputated. (He received the Medal of Honor in 1893 for his heroism at Fair Oaks.) Brig. Gen. Philip Kearny, who had lost his left arm, visited Howard and joked that they would be able to shop for gloves together. Howard recovered quickly enough to rejoin the army for the Battle of Antietam, in which he rose to division command in the II Corps.

He was promoted to major general in November 1862 and assumed command of the XI Corps the following April, replacing Maj. Gen. Franz Sigel. Since the corps was composed largely of German immigrants, many of whom spoke no English, the soldiers were resentful of their new leader and openly called for Sigel's reinstatement.

=== Failure at Chancellorsville ===
At the Battle of Chancellorsville, Howard suffered the first of two significant military setbacks. On May 2, 1863, his corps was on the right flank of the Union line, northwest of the crossroads of Chancellorsville. Robert E. Lee and Lt. Gen. Thomas J. "Stonewall" Jackson devised an audacious plan in which Jackson's entire corps would march secretly around the Union flank and attack it. Howard was warned by Maj. Gen. Joseph Hooker, now commanding the Army of the Potomac, that his flank was "in the air", not anchored by a natural obstacle, such as a river, and that Confederate forces might be on the move in his direction. Howard failed to heed the warning and Jackson struck before dark, routing the XI Corps and causing a serious disruption to the Union plans.

=== Gettysburg ===
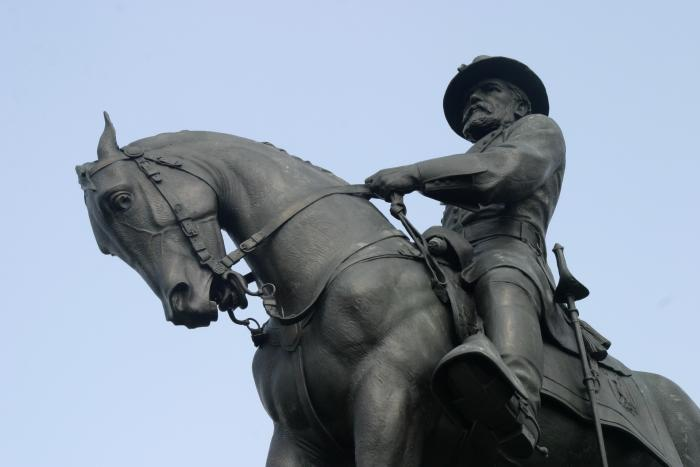
Monument to Howard in Gettysburg, Pennsylvania

At the Battle of Gettysburg, the XI Corps, still chastened by its humiliation in May, arrived on the field in the afternoon of July 1, 1863. Poor positioning of the defensive line by one of Howard's subordinate division commanders, Brig. Gen. Francis C. Barlow, was exploited by the Confederate corps of Lt. Gen. Richard S. Ewell and once again the XI Corps collapsed, forcing it to retreat through the streets of Gettysburg, leaving many men behind to be taken prisoner. On Cemetery Hill, south of town, Howard quarreled with Maj. Gen. Winfield S. Hancock about who was in command of the defense. Hancock had been sent by Maj. Gen. George G. Meade with written orders to take command, but Howard insisted that he was the ranking general present. Eventually, he relented.

Controversy centers on three points: 1) Howard's choice of Cemetery Hill as the key to defense; 2) the timing of Howard's mid-afternoon order to abandon positions north and west of town; and 3) Howard's reluctance to recognize that Hancock, his junior, had superseded him. Historian John A. Carpenter holds that Howard alone had wisely selected Cemetery Hill, that the order to withdraw was probably a sound one, and that the conflict between Howard and Hancock might have been avoided had Meade himself gotten onto the field.

Howard started circulating the story that his corps' failure had actually been triggered by the collapse of Maj. Gen. Abner Doubleday's I Corps to the west, which was a partial reason for Doubleday's removal from command of the corps. However, the excuse was not accepted by history (the reverse was actually true), and the reputation of the XI Corps was ruined. Some argue that Howard should get some credit for the eventual success at Gettysburg because he wisely stationed one of his divisions (Maj. Gen. Adolph von Steinwehr's) on Cemetery Hill as a reserve and critical subsequent defensive line.

For the remainder of the three-day battle, the corps remained on the defensive around Cemetery Hill, withstood assaults by Maj. Gen. Jubal Early on July 2, and participated at the margin of the defense against Pickett's Charge on July 3. Also at Gettysburg, Howard's younger brother, Major Charles Henry Howard, served as his aide-de-camp.

=== Western Theater ===
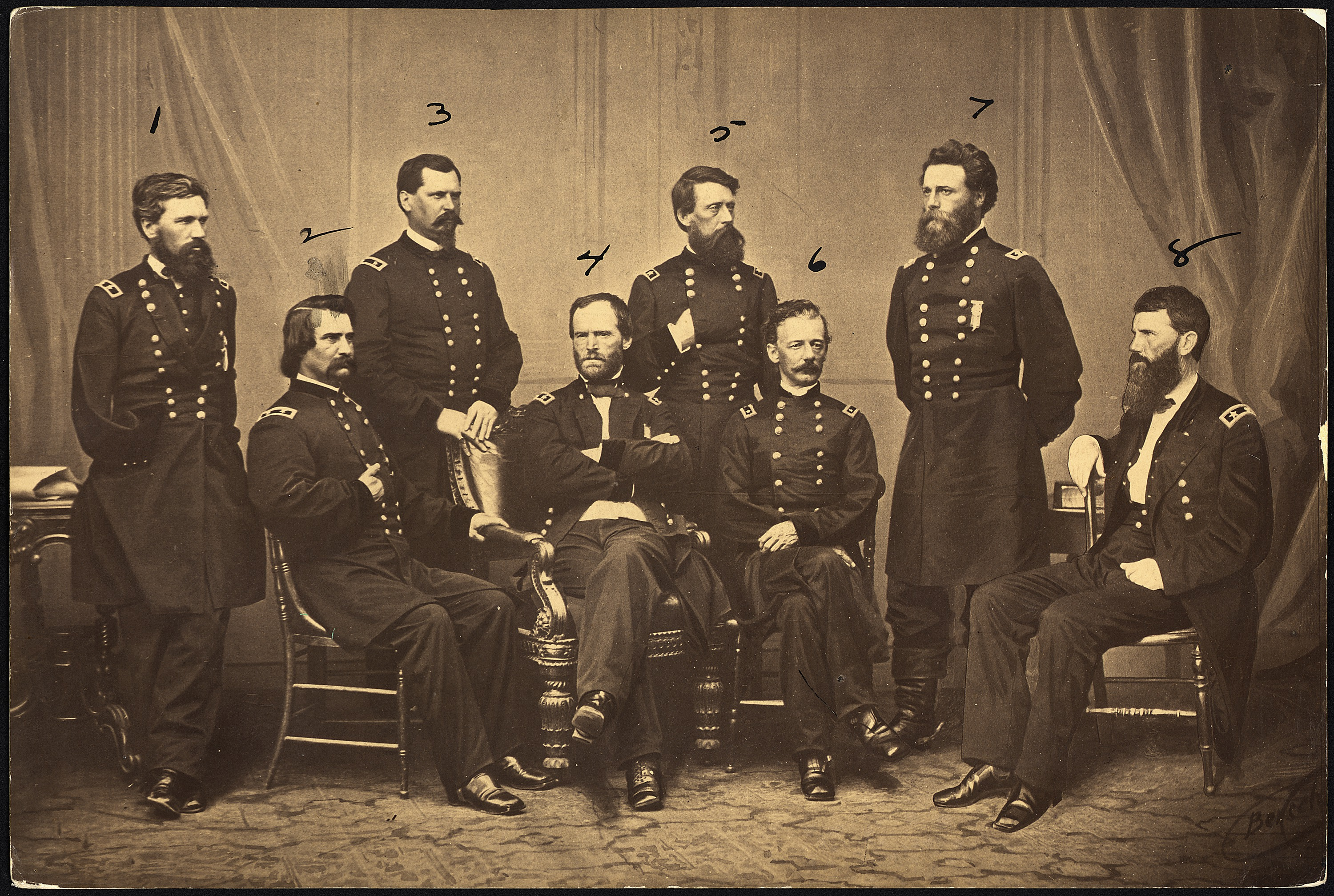
Major General William T. Sherman, Commanding Military Division of the Mississippi, and his Generals, 1. Maj. Gen. O. O. Howard; 2. Maj. Gen. John A. Logan; 3. Maj. Gen. William B. Hazen; 4. Maj. Gen. William T. Sherman; 5. Maj. Gen. Jefferson C. Davis; 6. Maj. Gen. Henry Warner Slocum; 7. Maj. Gen. Joseph A. Mower; 8. Maj. Gen. Francis P. Blair Jr. (possibly cut in)

Howard and XI Corps were transferred to the Western Theater with fellow general Henry Slocum's XII Corps to become part of the Army of the Cumberland in Tennessee; they were commanded once again by "Fighting Joe" Hooker. In the Battles for Chattanooga, the corps joined the impulsive assault that captured Missionary Ridge and forced the retreat of Gen. Braxton Bragg. In July 1864, following the death of Maj. Gen. James B. McPherson, temporary command of the Army of the Tennessee was given by order of William Tecumseh Sherman to the ranking officer on the field that day, Major General John A. Logan. Shortly after the success at the Battle of Atlanta, Sherman (who favored granting command to a West Point graduate) appointed Howard to permanent command of the Army of the Tennessee. At the closing of his "After Action Report" filed by Major General John A. Logan on September 10, 1864, Logan referred to his having served as Commander of the Army of the Tennessee for a scant four days. Logan's detailed report ended: "I withdrew the Army of the Tennessee the night of the 26th, and moved it along the rear of the center and right of the army to a position across Proctor's Creek. After putting the army in position that night I was relieved by Maj. Gen. Howard."

Howard subsequently led the right wing of Maj. Gen. William Tecumseh Sherman's famous March to the Sea, through Georgia and then the Carolinas. Sherman, having favored Howard over Logan for permanent command of the Army of the Tennessee, recognized Logan's success at Atlanta. In recognition of the outstanding leadership Logan displayed at Atlanta, Sherman asked Howard to allow Logan to ceremonially lead the Army in the May 1865 Grand Review in Washington. Howard agreed when Sherman appealed to him as a Christian gentleman. Ultimately, by the war's end, Gen. Sherman would commend Howard as a corps commander of "the utmost skill, nicety and precision".

== Postwar career ==
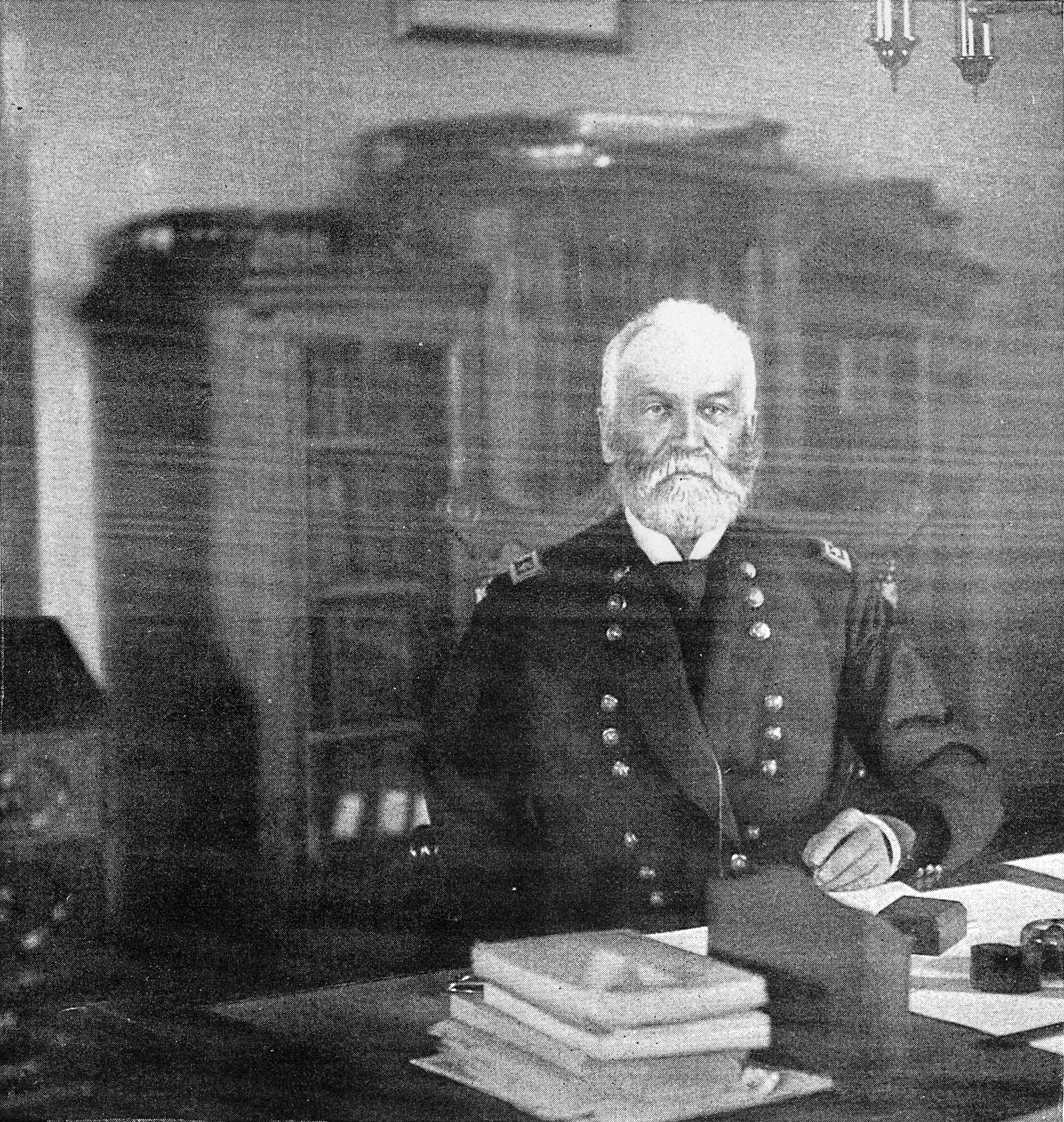
Howard in Military Uniform in 1893 at Governor's Island

=== Freedmen's Bureau ===
From May 1865 to July 1874, General Howard was commissioner of the Freedmen's Bureau (the Army's Bureau of Refugees, Freedmen, and Abandoned Lands), where he played a major role in the Reconstruction era, and had charge of integrating freedmen (former slaves) into American society. Howard devised far-reaching programs and guidelines including social welfare in the form of rations, schooling, courts, and medical care. Howard often clashed with President Andrew Johnson, who strongly disliked the welfare aspects of the Freedman's Bureau, and especially tried to return political power to Southern whites. However, Howard had the support of the Radical Republicans in Congress.

When the Radical Republicans gained power in 1867, they gave Black people the right to vote in the South and set up new elections, which the Republican coalition of freedmen, northern Republicans who came south and were referred to derogatorily as carpetbaggers, and southerners who supported Reconstruction, nicknamed scalawags, won except in Virginia. The Bureau was very active in helping Black people organize themselves politically and so it became a target of partisan hostility.

Johnson called Howard a fanatic. Reconstruction's opponents alleged that, in abusing both civil and military power, the Bureau became a centralized dictatorship. Howard described the extent of his enormous powers as:

...Almost unlimited authority gave me scope and liberty of action... Legislative, judicial and executive powers were combined in my commission.

Johnson reacted to the meaning of such unlimited scope of action against civilians:

The power thus given to the commanding officer over all the people ... is that of an absolute monarch.... He alone is permitted to determine the rights of persons and property... It places at his free disposal all the lands and goods in his district, and he may distribute them without let or hindrance to whom he pleases. Being bound by no State law, and there being no other law to regulate the subject, he may make a criminal code of his own; and can make it as bloody as any in history.... Everything is a crime which he chooses to call so, and all persons are condemned who he pronounces to be guilty.

The limited ideological framework of General Howard and his aides encouraged their attempt at radical reconstruction of southern society without realizing the need for essential legislation. They thought that the elimination of all statutory inequalities such as by allowing Black court testimony would be enough to assure protection. Southern states pretended to comply with this point in order to end the threat of the Freedmen's Bureau courts' system.

=== Military commands and Native American affairs ===
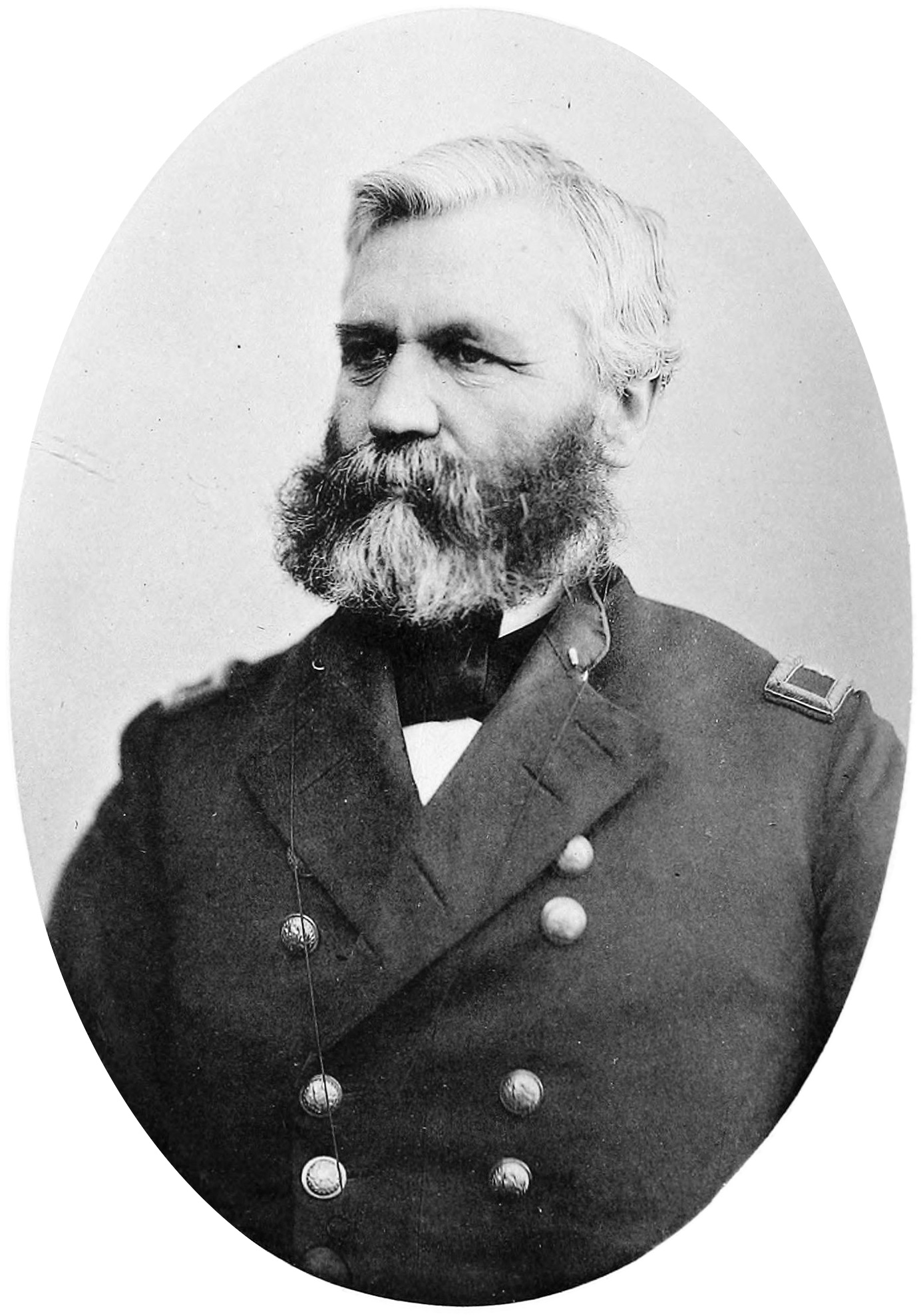
Oliver Otis Howard during the Nez Perce War

In 1872, Howard, accompanied by 1st Lt. Joseph A. Sladen, who served as his aide, was ordered to Arizona Territory to negotiate a peace treaty with Cochise, resulting in a treaty on October 12. This episode of American history was dramatized in the movie "Broken Arrow" (see below)

He was placed in command of the Department of the Columbia in 1874 and went west to Washington Territory's Fort Vancouver, where he fought in the Indian Wars, particularly against the Nez Perce in Idaho and Montana Territories in 1877, with the resultant surrender of Chief Joseph. Howard was criticized by Chief Joseph as precipitating the war by trying to rush the Nez Perce to a smaller reservation, with no advance notice, no discussion, and no time to prepare. Joseph said, "If General Howard had given me plenty of time to gather up my stock and treated Too-hool-hool-suit as a man should be treated, there would have been no war."

Subsequently, Howard was superintendent of the U.S. Military Academy at West Point in 1881–1882. He served as commander of the Department of the Platte from 1882 to 1886 and the Military Division of the Pacific from 1886 to 1888. From 1888, his final command was of the Department of the East (Military Division of the Atlantic) at Fort Columbus on Governors Island in New York Harbor, encompassing the states east of the Mississippi River. He retired from the U.S. Army at that posting in 1894 with the rank of major general. The French government made him a chevalier of the Legion of Honor in 1884 and he was subsequently promoted to the ranks of officer and commander.

=== Howard University ===
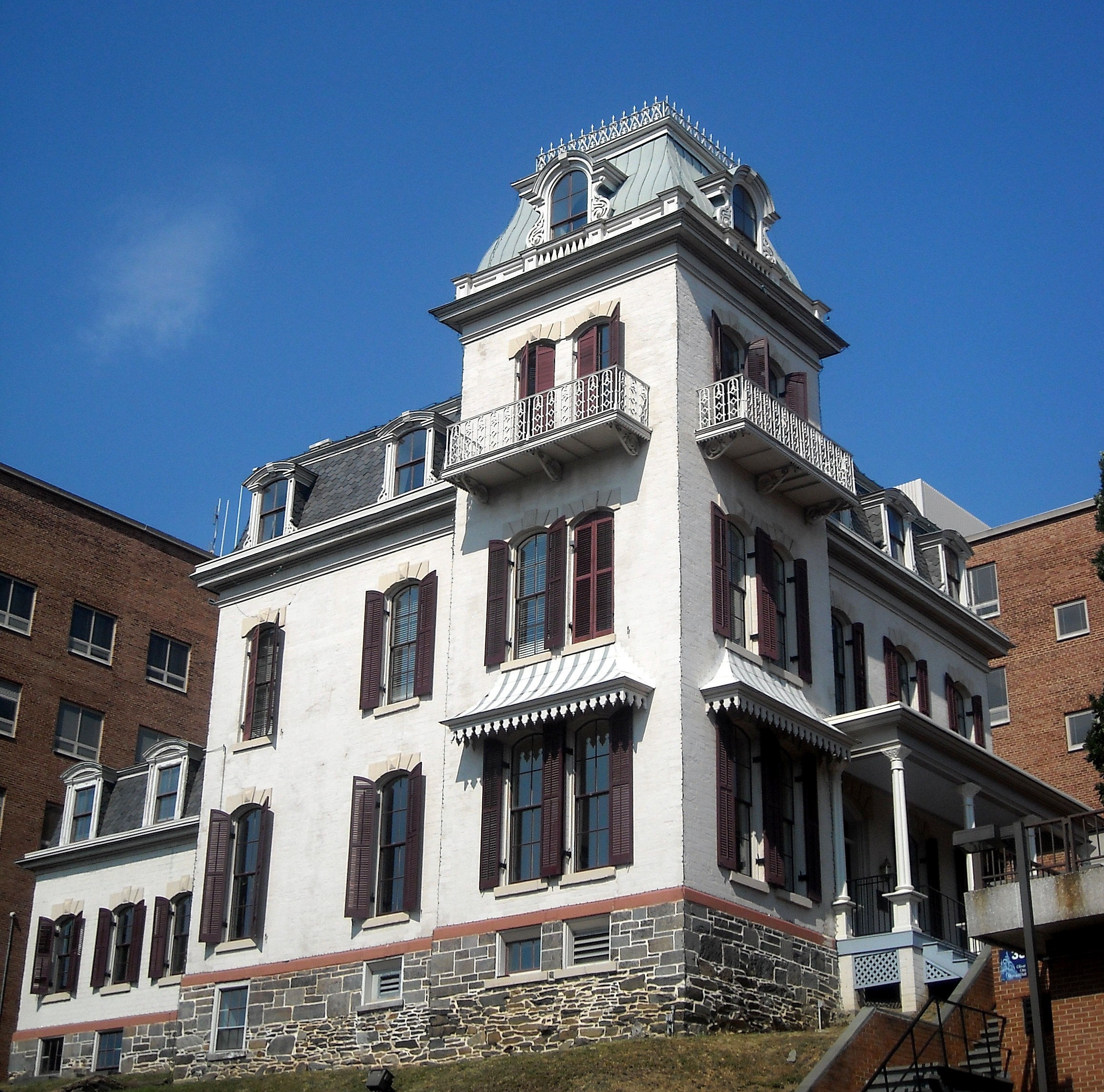
The General Oliver Otis Howard House, located on the campus of Howard University in Washington, D.C., was declared a National Historic Landmark in 1974.

General Howard is also remembered for playing a role in founding Howard University, which was incorporated by Congress in 1867. The school is nonsectarian and is open to both sexes without regard to race. On November 20, 1866, Howard was among 10 members of various socially concerned groups of the time who met in Washington, D.C., to discuss plans for a theological seminary to train black ministers. Interest was sufficient, however, to create an educational institute for areas other than the ministry. The result was the Howard Normal and Theological Institute for the Education of Preachers and Teachers. On January 8, 1867, the board of trustees voted to change the name of the institution to Howard University. Howard served as president from 1869 to 1874.

He was quoted as saying, "The opposition to Negro education made itself felt everywhere in a combination not to allow the freed men any room or building in which a school might be taught. In 1865, 1866, and 1867, mobs of the baser classes at intervals and in all parts of the South occasionally burned school buildings and churches used as schools, flogged teachers or drove them away, and in a number of instances murdered them." He also founded Lincoln Memorial University in Harrogate, Tennessee, in 1895, for the education of the "mountain whites".

=== Memberships ===
General Howard was a member of the Society of the Cincinnati, the Military Order of the Loyal Legion of the United States and the Grand Army of the Republic.

=== Death and burial ===
Howard died in Burlington, Vermont on October 26, 1909, and is buried at Lakeview Cemetery in Burlington. At his death, Howard was the last surviving Union Army general to have held the permanent rank of a general in the regular U.S. Army.

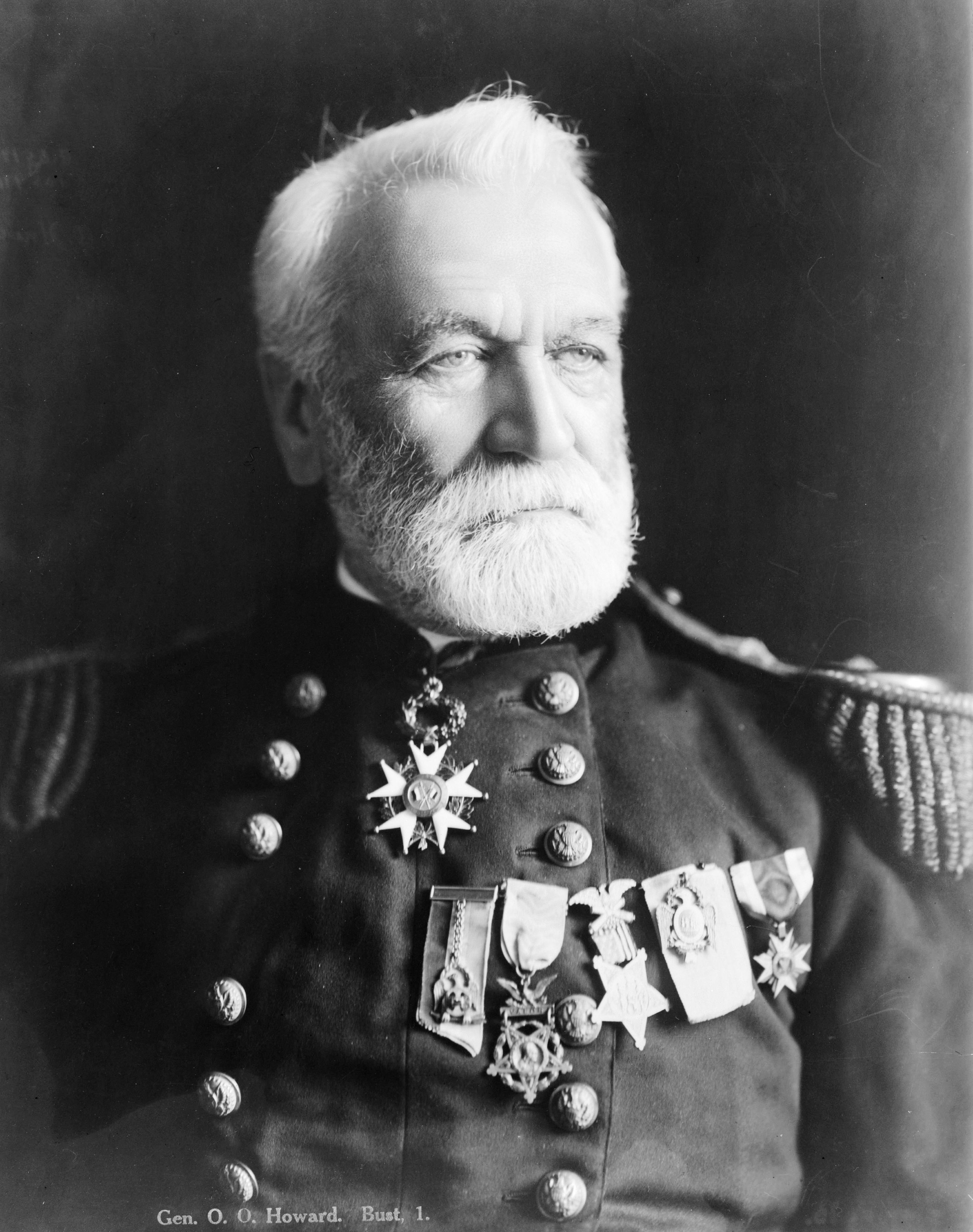
Howard c. 1908

== Legacy ==
A bust of Howard, designed by the artist James E. Kelly, is on display at Howard University. An equestrian statue is on East Cemetery Hill on the Gettysburg Battlefield. A dormitory at Bowdoin College is named for Howard.

The Oliver O. Howard Relief Corps of the Grand Army of the Republic provided funds to help destitute former Union soldiers and to support worthy public causes. It contributed money and the design for the State Flag of Utah in 1920. An Army Reserve Center was named after him in Auburn, Maine, and is still used today by several U.S. Army Reserve units.

Howard High School of Technology in Wilmington, Delaware, is named in his honor, as is Howard County, Nebraska and the Howard School of Academics and Technology, in Chattanooga, Tennessee. Howard, Kansas is named in his honor.

The O. O. Howard House, located on Officers Row, within the Fort Vancouver National Historic Site, was built in 1878 upon General Howard's order at a cost of $6,938.20 (~$202,923 in 2025). Completed in 1879, the building suffered a fire in 1986 and was left vacant until renovated by the City of Vancouver in 1998. The building serves as the headquarters of the Fort Vancouver National Trust.

In Portland, Oregon, on the 150th Anniversary of Howard's acts of valor on June 1, 1862, while leading his troops at the Battle of Fair Oaks, a commemorative wreath was laid by the Oregon Civil War Sesquicentennial Commission at the site of General Howard's former residence in downtown Portland at the corner of SW 10th and Morrison. The month of June 2012 was dedicated to Howard with a lecture and programs by the Oregon Civil War Sesquicentennial spotlighting General Howard's activities in Portland and at Fort Vancouver, Washington; and his post-war achievements at the Freedmen's Bureau, Howard University and Lincoln Memorial University and the Indian Wars. In a New York Times interview given the day after Howard retired from the Army on November 8, 1894, at the age of 64, it was reported that he was traveling West to stay at his daughter's house in Portland, Oregon, where he planned to start writing his memoirs.

== Selected works ==
Howard was the author of numerous books after the war, including the following:

- Donald's School Days (1878)
- Nez Perce Joseph (1881)
- General Taylor (1892)
- Isabella of Castile (1894)
- Fighting For Humanity, or Camp and Quarterdeck (1898)
- Henry in the War: Or the Model Volunteer (1899)
- Autobiography (1907)
- My Life and Experiences among Our Hostile Indians (1907)

He wrote an account of the Civil War's Atlanta Campaign in Century Magazine for July 1887.

He translated:

- Théodore Borel, Count Agénor de Gasparin, Life of Count Agénor de Gasparin (New York: G. P. Putnam's Sons, 1881)

== In popular media ==
In the 1950 film Broken Arrow, Howard is played by Basil Ruysdael opposite James Stewart, who portrays Tom Jeffords. In the 1956 film The Last Wagon, he is portrayed by Carl Benton Reid. Both of these films were written and directed by Delmer Daves.

James Whitmore portrays General Howard in the 1975 television film I Will Fight No More Forever about the U.S. Army campaign against the Nez Perce and the surrender of Chief Joseph in 1877. In episode 6 of The West, he is portrayed in voiceovers by Eli Wallach and is the protagonist of William T. Vollmann's novel The Dying Grass (2015).

General Howard is portrayed in the final episode of the seven-part, 2024 series Manhunt.

== Dates of rank ==
Insignia	Rank	Date	Component
No insignia	Cadet, USMA	1 September 1850	Regular Army
	Second Lieutenant	1 July 1854 (brevet); 15 February 1855 (permanent)	Regular Army
	First Lieutenant	1 July 1857	Regular Army
	Colonel	4 June 1861	Volunteers
	Brigadier General	3 September (accepted 5 September) 1861	Volunteers
	Major General	29 November 1862	Volunteers
	Brigadier General	21 December 1864	Regular Army
	Major General	19 March (accepted 2 April) 1886	Regular Army

== Awards ==
- Medal of Honor
- Thanks of Congress
- Civil War Campaign Medal
- Indian Campaign Medal
- Commander, Legion of Honor (France)

=== Medal of Honor citation ===
In the citation for Howard's Medal of Honor – issued June 1, 1862, at Fair Oaks, Virginia – he was described as "Brigadier General, U.S. Volunteers". The citation reads:

Led the 61st New York Infantry in a charge in which he was twice severely wounded in the right arm, necessitating amputation.

== See also ==
- List of American Civil War Medal of Honor recipients: G–L
- List of American Civil War generals (Union)
- Sherman's March (2007, documentary)
- Charles Henry Howard (brother)

== Notes ==
Military offices
Preceded by John Sedgwick	Commander of the II Corps; January 26, 1863 – February 5, 1863	Succeeded by Darius N. Couch
Preceded by Gordon Granger	Commander of the IV Corps; April 10, 1864 – July 27, 1864	Succeeded by David S. Stanley
Preceded by Carl Schurz	Commander of the XI Corps; April 2, 1863 – July 1, 1863	Succeeded by Carl Schurz
Preceded by Carl Schurz	Commander of the XI Corps; July 1, 1863 – September 25, 1863	Succeeded by Army of the Cumberland
Preceded by Army of the Potomac	Commander of the XI Corps (Army of the Cumberland); September 25, 1863 – January 21, 1864	Succeeded by Carl Schurz
Preceded by Carl Schurz	Commander of the XI Corps (Army of the Cumberland); February 25, 1864 – April 10, 1864	Succeeded by none
Preceded by John Schofield	Superintendents of the United States Military Academy; 1881–1882	Succeeded by Wesley Merritt
