= Chief Joseph Trail Ride =

Annual horse trail ride

The Chief Joseph Trail Ride is an annual horse trail ride that follows the route the Nimiipuu (Nez Perce) took during the Nez Perce War in 1877. The trail in its entirety is 1,300 miles long, separated into thirteen separate rides, which take place sequentially. The ride is on a 13-year cycle. The trail ride was started in 1965 by the Appaloosa Horse Club.

== The Original Ride ==
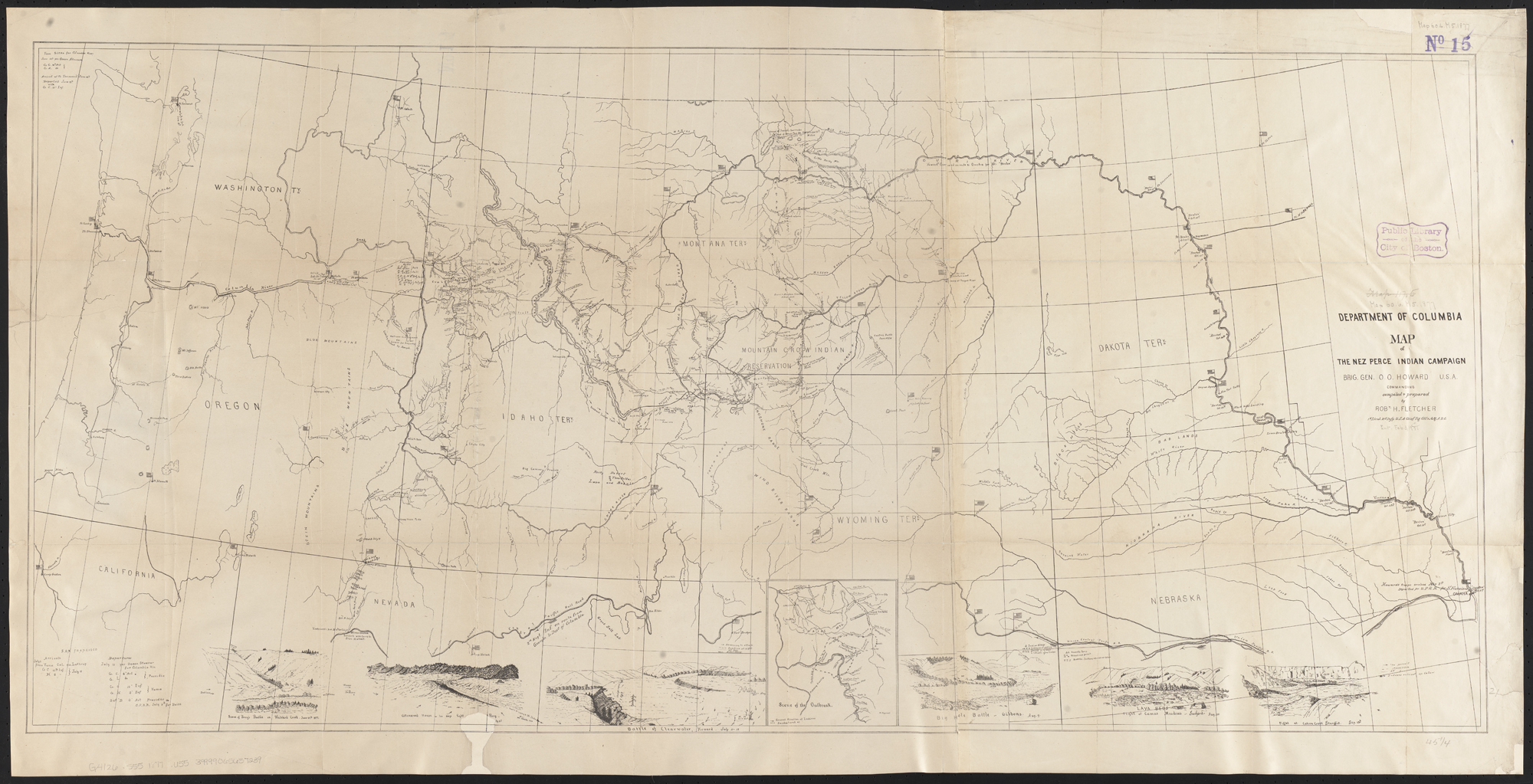
Map of the original Nez Perce Indian campaign

The trail ride follows where Chief Joseph led the Nimiipuu while fighting the U.S. Cavalry to prevent being put on a reservation. The trail goes through Washington, Idaho, Wyoming, Montana, and Canada. The trail begins in Wallowa Valley, Washington and ends in Bear Paw Mountains, Montana. The trip lasted from June to October, 1877. The Nimiipuu were trying to reach the Canadian border. The Nimiipuu were eventually overwhelmed by the U.S. Cavalry in Bear Paw Mountains. The original ride consisted of Native American men, women, and children.

The first ride took place in 1965. It included forty riders, including George Hatley. The ride started in Enterprise, Oregon on June 28. Dick Hammond was the trail boss. Other significant riders included: co-manager Frank Kramer, AHC historian Francis Haines, veterinarian Dr. Homer Webb, medical doctor Dr. Galen A. Rodgers, AHC President Don Imboden, and local historian G.J. Tucker. The riders were invited to a dinner hosted by the mayor of Joseph, Oregon Ab Daisley. The ride lasted five days.

== Background ==
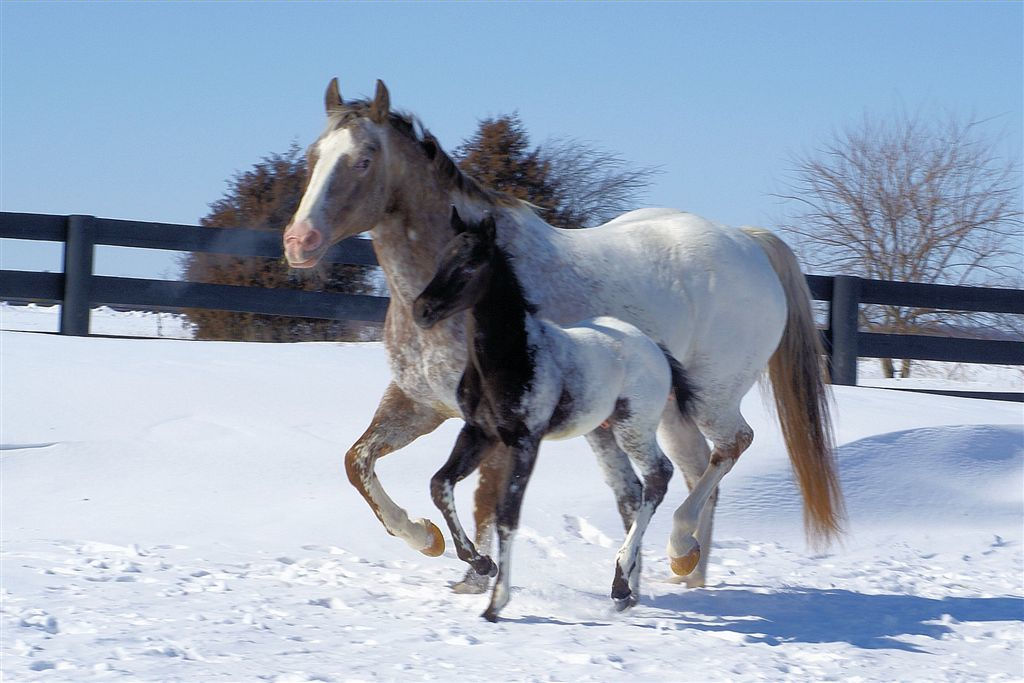
Appaloosa

The Nimiipuu were considered to be exceptionally skilled horsemen. The ride was started by the Appaloosa Horse Club, with intentions of commemorating the historic trail of the Nimiipuu. The Appaloosa Club also sponsors the ride. The ride is only open to registered appaloosas registered with the Appaloosa Horse Club. The Chief Joseph Trail Ride is the longest running trail ride hosted by the club. The club also created the Chief Joseph Trail Ride Youth Experience. There is no determined start and end location of each of the segments, with it varying every year. The ride follows the Nez Perce National Historic Trail, however it does not follow the trail exactly.

== Trail Ride ==
The trail is separated into thirteen segments, and is considered to be a looping trail ride. Each segment is approximately 100 miles. One segment of the trail is ridden each year, with the ride lasting five days. Each day of the ride will cover 25 miles.

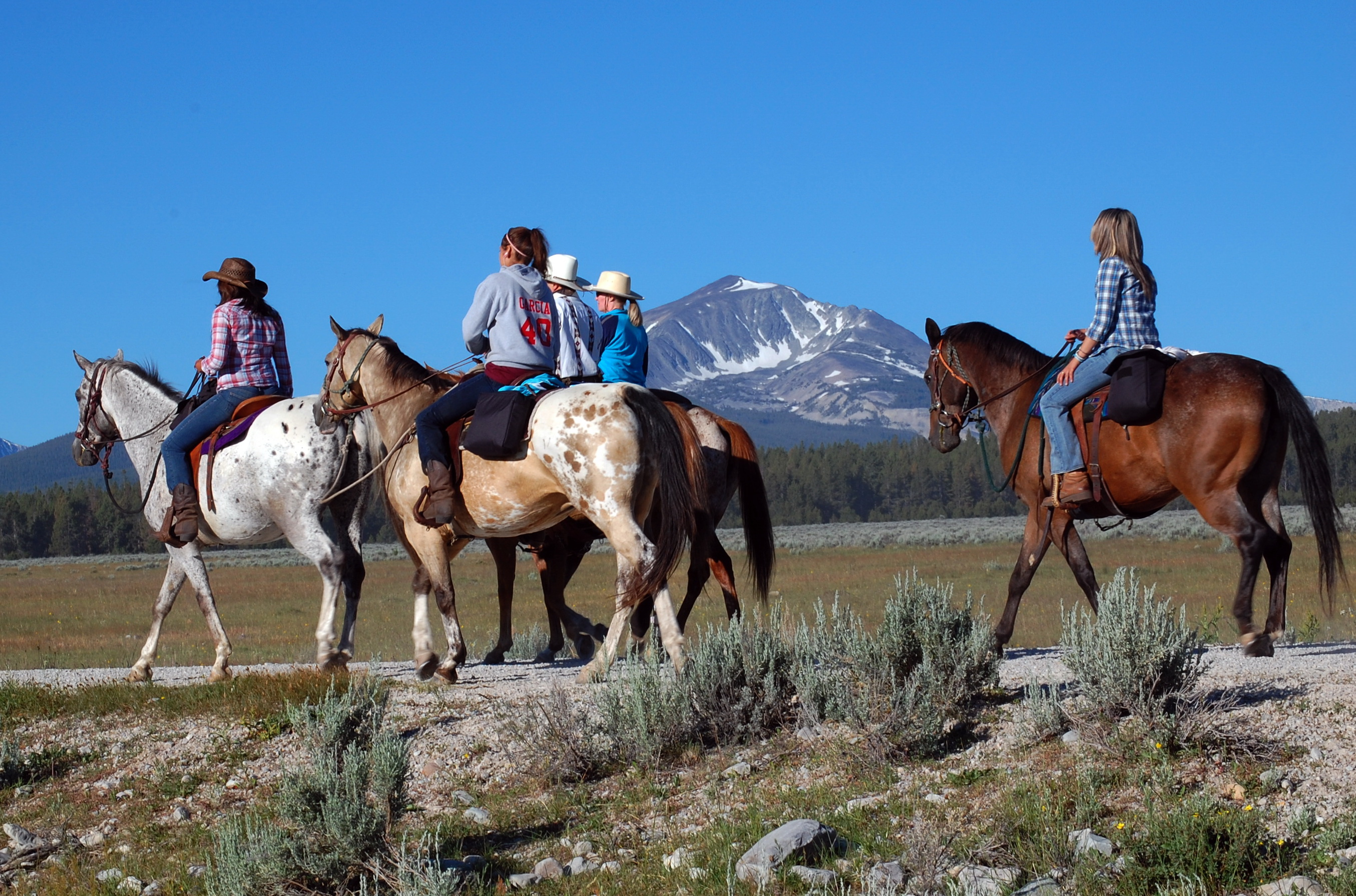
Riders on the Chief Joseph Trail

The trail beings at Wallowa Lake, Oregon. The trail begins northeast until it reaches Dug Bar, where it crosses the Snake River. The trail goes across north-central Idaho, entering in Lewiston and exiting near Lolo Pass. After entering Montana, the trail goes through Bitterroot Valley. The trail once again enters Idaho in Bannock Pass, and enters the Targhee Pass in Montana, crossing the Continental Divide. The trail then cuts through Yellowstone National Park, following the Clark Fork from Wyoming back to Montana. The trail finally ends in Bear's Paw Mountains, forty miles south of the Canadian border.

The Nez Perce invite participants of the trail ride to observe traditional ceremonies and experience their culture.

In 2012, there were around 150 riders.

In 2014, there were 130 riders, with Chief Scout Ron Fowler.

In 2016, there were 165 riders, with Chief Scout Ron Fowler.

In 2018, there were 105 riders and Andy Shaw was the trail boss.

In 2019, there were 110 riders.

In 2023, there were nearly 100 riders and Rodd Baxter was the trail ride manager.
