= Chief Joseph =

Native American leader (1840–1904)

- hinmatóowyalahtq̓it
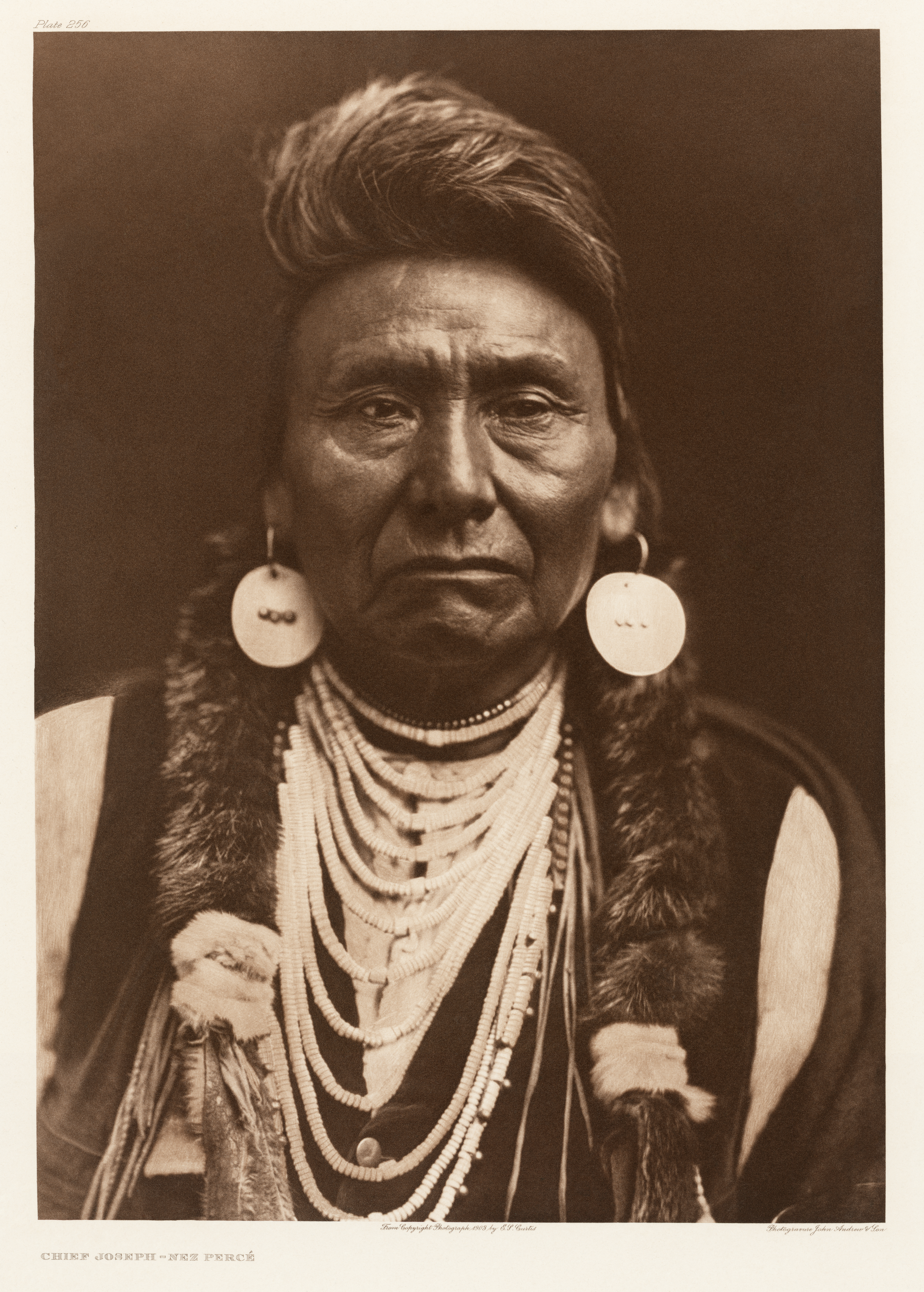
- Portrait by Edward S. Curtis, 1903
- Born: March 3, 1840; Wallowa Valley, Nez Perce territory (Note: Claimed as Oregon Country by the United States and as the Columbia District by the United Kingdom)
- Died: September 21, 1904 (aged 64); Colville Indian Reservation, Washington, U.S.
- Resting place: Chief Joseph Cemetery, Nespelem, Washington; 48°10′6.7″N 118°58′38″W
- Other names: Hin-mah-too-yah-lat-kekt; In-mut-too-yah-lat-lat; Joseph the Younger
- Known for: Nez Perce leader
- Predecessor: Joseph the Elder (father)
- Spouses: Heyoon Yoyikt (m. 1880): Springtime
- Children: 5
- Parents: Tuekakas (father); Khapkhaponimi (mother)
- Relatives: Ollokot

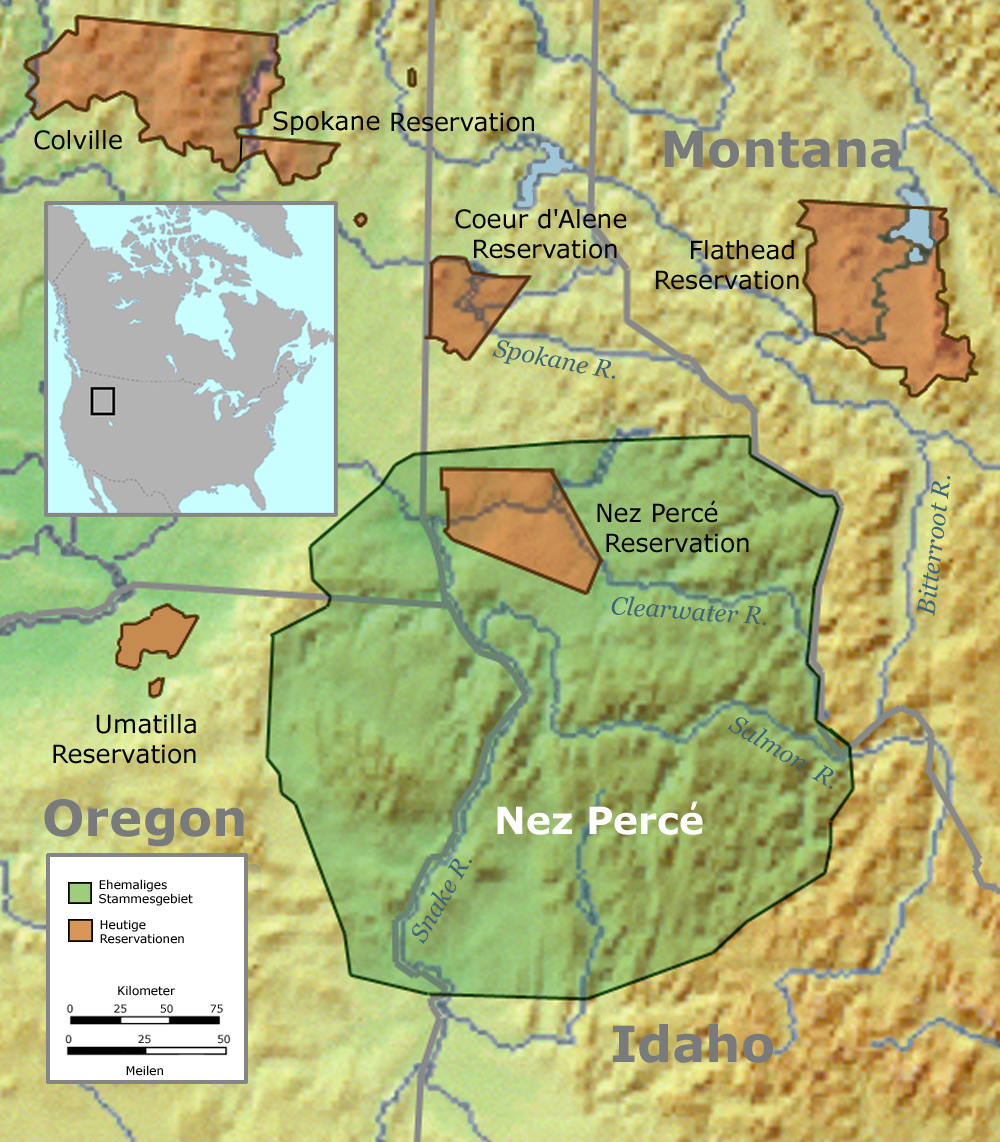
Original Nez Perce territory (green) and the reduced reservation of 1863 (brown)

Hin-mah-too-yah-lat-kekt or hinmatóowyalahtq̓it, "Thunder Rolling Down the Mountain" (March 3, 1840 – September 21, 1904), popularly known as Chief Joseph, Young Joseph, or Joseph the Younger, was a leader of the wal-lam-wat-kain (Wallowa) band of Nez Perce, a Native American tribe of the interior Pacific Northwest region of the United States, in the latter half of the 19th century. He succeeded his father Tuekakas (Chief Joseph the Elder) in the early 1870s.

Chief Joseph led his band of Nez Perce during the most tumultuous period in their history, when they were forcibly removed by the United States federal government from their ancestral lands in the Wallowa Valley of northeastern Oregon onto a significantly reduced reservation in the Idaho Territory. A series of violent encounters with white settlers in the spring of 1877 culminated in those Nez Perce who resisted removal, including Joseph's band and an allied band of the Palouse tribe, fleeing the United States in an attempt to reach political asylum alongside the Lakota people, who had sought refuge in Canada under the leadership of Sitting Bull.

At least 800 men, women, and children led by Joseph and other Nez Perce chiefs were pursued by the U.S. Army under General Oliver O. Howard in a 1,170-mile (1,900 km) fighting retreat known as the Nez Perce War. The skill with which the Nez Perce fought and the manner in which they conducted themselves in the face of incredible adversity earned them widespread admiration from their military opponents and the American public, and coverage of the war in U.S. newspapers led to popular recognition of Chief Joseph and the Nez Perce.

In October 1877, after months of fugitive resistance, most of the surviving remnants of Joseph's band were cornered in northern Montana Territory, just 40 miles (64 km) from the Canadian border. Unable to fight any longer, Chief Joseph surrendered to the Army with the understanding that he and his people would be allowed to return to the reservation in western Idaho. He was instead transported between various forts and reservations on the southern Great Plains before being moved to the Colville Indian Reservation in the state of Washington, where he died in 1904.

== Background ==
Chief Joseph was born Hinmuuttu-yalatlat (alternatively Hinmaton-Yalatkit or hin-mah-too-yah-lat-kekt [Nez Perce: "Thunder Rolling Down the Mountain"], or hinmatóoyalahtq'it ["Thunder traveling to higher areas"]) in the Wallowa Valley of northeastern Oregon. He was known as Young Joseph during his youth because his father, Tuekakas, was baptized with the same Christian name and later become known as "Old Joseph" or "Joseph the Elder".

While initially hospitable to the region's white settlers, Joseph the Elder grew wary when they demanded more Indian lands. Tensions grew as the settlers appropriated traditional Indian lands for farming and livestock. Isaac Stevens, governor of the Washington Territory, organized a council to designate separate areas for natives and settlers in 1855. Joseph the Elder and the other Nez Perce chiefs signed the Treaty of Walla Walla, with the United States establishing a Nez Perce reservation encompassing 7,700,000 acres (31,000 km^{2}) in present-day Idaho, Oregon, and Washington. The 1855 reservation maintained much of the traditional Nez Perce lands, including Joseph's Wallowa Valley. It is recorded that the elder Joseph requested that Young Joseph protect their 7.7-million-acre homeland, and guard his father's burial place.

In 1863, however, an influx of new settlers, attracted by a gold rush, led the government to call a second council. Government commissioners asked the Nez Perce to accept a new, much smaller reservation of 760,000 acres (3,100 km^{2}) situated around the village of Lapwai in western Idaho Territory, and excluding the Wallowa Valley. In exchange, they were promised financial rewards, schools, and a hospital for the reservation. Chief Lawyer and one of his allied chiefs signed the treaty on behalf of the Nez Perce Nation, but Joseph the Elder and several other chiefs were opposed to selling their lands and did not sign.

Their refusal to sign caused a rift between the "non-treaty" and "treaty" bands of Nez Perce. The "treaty" Nez Perce moved within the new reservation's boundaries, while the "non-treaty" Nez Perce remained on their ancestral lands. Joseph the Elder demarcated Wallowa land with a series of poles, proclaiming, "Inside this boundary all our people were born. It circles the graves of our fathers, and we will never give up these graves to any man." Also, his brother was Ollokot, a fierce leader of the Nez Perce warriors.

== Leadership of the Nez Perce ==
Joseph the Younger succeeded his father as leader of the Wallowa band in 1871. Before his death, the latter counseled his son:

"My son, my body is returning to my mother earth, and my spirit is going very soon to see the Great Spirit Chief. When I am gone, think of your country. You are the chief of these people. They look to you to guide them. Always remember that your father never sold his country. You must stop your ears whenever you are asked to sign a treaty selling your home. A few years more and white men will be all around you. They have their eyes on this land. My son, never forget my dying words. This country holds your father's body. Never sell the bones of your father and your mother."

The non-treaty Nez Perce suffered many injustices at the hands of settlers and prospectors, but out of fear of reprisal from the militarily superior Americans, Joseph never allowed any violence against them, instead making many concessions to them in the hope of securing peace. A handwritten document mentioned in the Oral History of the Grande Ronde recounts an 1872 experience by Oregon pioneer Henry Young and two friends in search of acreage at Prairie Creek, east of Wallowa Lake. Young's party was surrounded by 40–50 Nez Perce led by Chief Joseph. The Chief told Young that white men were not welcome near Prairie Creek, and Young's party was forced to leave without violence.

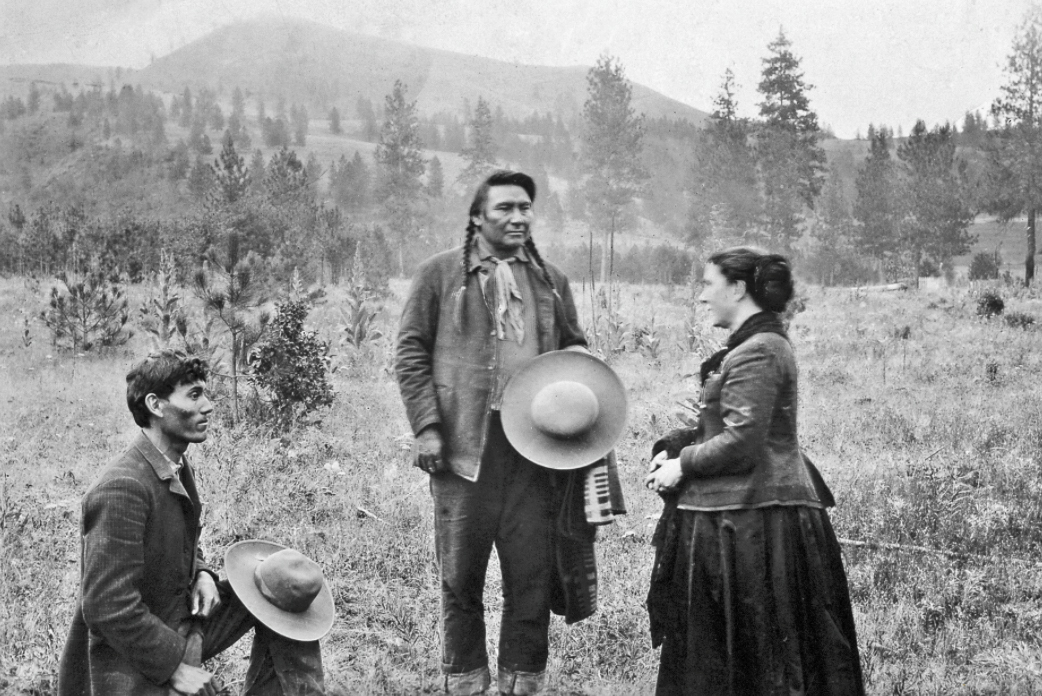
An 1889 photograph of Joseph speaking to ethnologist Alice Cunningham Fletcher and her interpreter James Stuart

In 1873, Joseph negotiated with the federal government to ensure his people could stay on their land in the Wallowa Valley. But in 1877, the government reversed its policy, and Army General Oliver O. Howard threatened to attack if the Wallowa band did not relocate to the Idaho reservation with the other Nez Perce. Joseph reluctantly agreed. Before the outbreak of hostilities, General Howard held a council at Fort Lapwai to try to convince Joseph and his people to relocate. Joseph finished his address to the general, which focused on human equality, by expressing his "[disbelief that] the Great Spirit Chief gave one kind of men the right to tell another kind of men what they must do." Howard reacted angrily, interpreting the statement as a challenge to his authority. When Toohoolhoolzote protested, he was jailed for five days.

The day following the council, Joseph, White Bird, and Looking Glass all accompanied Howard to examine different areas within the reservation. Howard offered them a plot of land that was inhabited by whites and Native Americans, promising to clear out the current residents. Joseph and his chieftains refused, adhering to their tribal tradition of not taking what did not belong to them. Unable to find any suitable uninhabited land on the reservation, Howard informed Joseph that his people had 30 days to collect their livestock and move to the reservation. Joseph pleaded for more time, but Howard told him he would consider their presence in the Wallowa Valley beyond the 30-day mark an act of war.

Returning home, Joseph called a council among his people. At the council, he spoke on behalf of peace, preferring to abandon his father's grave over war. Toohoolhoolzote, insulted by his incarceration, advocated war. In June 1877, the Wallowa band began making preparations for the long journey to the reservation, meeting first with other bands at Rocky Canyon. At this council, too, many leaders urged war, while Joseph continued to argue in favor of peace. While the council was underway, a young man whose father had been killed rode up and announced that he and several other young men had retaliated by killing four white settlers. Still hoping to avoid further bloodshed, Joseph and other non-treaty Nez Perce leaders began moving people away from Idaho.

== Nez Perce War ==
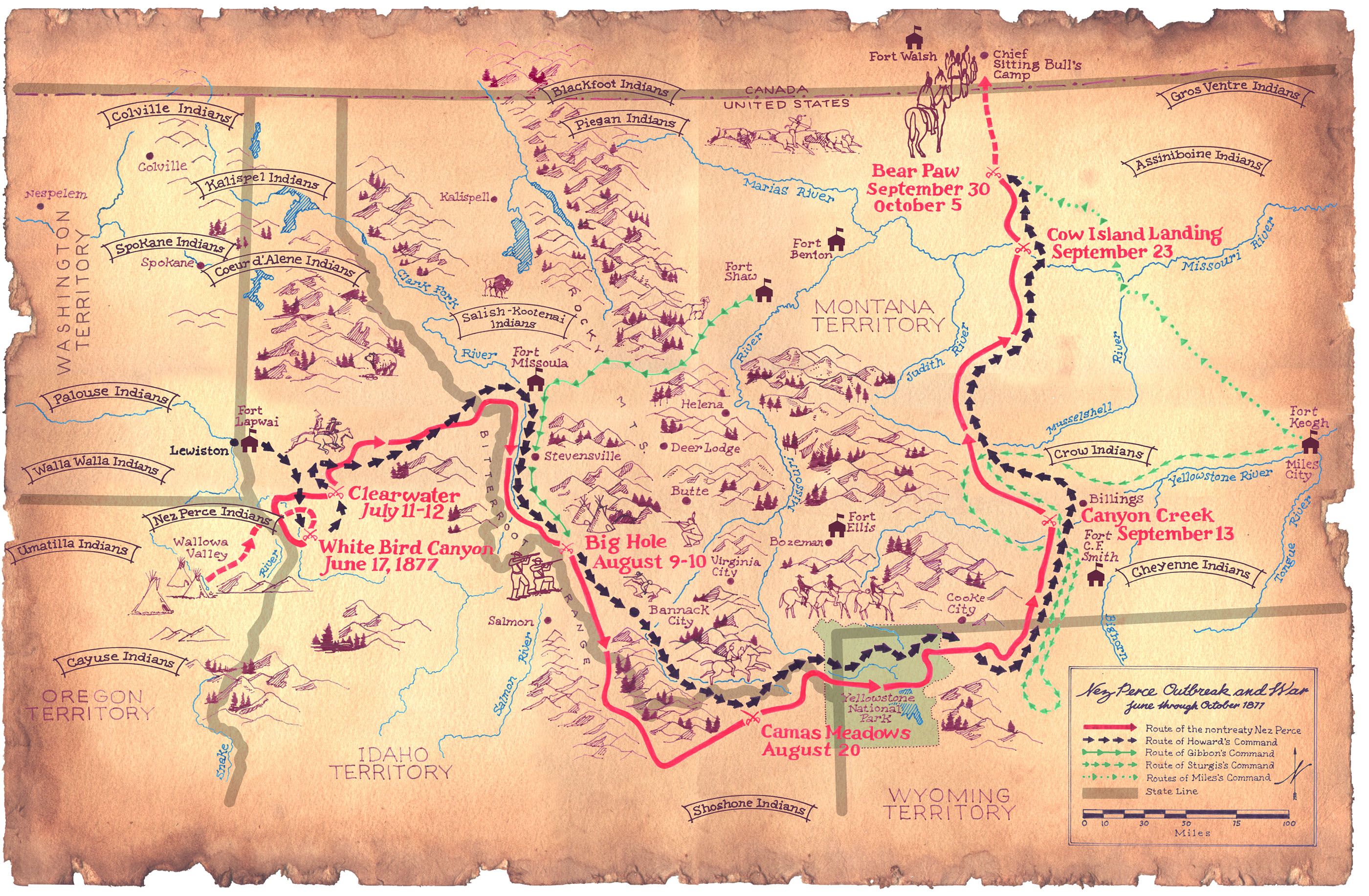
Map of the flight of the Nez Perce and key battle sites

The U.S. Army's pursuit of about 750 Nez Perce and a small allied band of the Palouse tribe, led by Chief Joseph and others, as they attempted to escape from Idaho became known as the Nez Perce War. Initially they had hoped to take refuge with the Crow Nation in the Montana Territory, but when the Crow refused to grant them aid, the Nez Perce went north in an attempt to obtain asylum with the Lakota band led by Sitting Bull, who had fled to Canada following the Great Sioux War in 1876. In Hear Me, My Chiefs!: Nez Perce Legend and History, Lucullus V. McWhorter argues that the Nez Perce were a peaceful people that were forced into war by the United States when their land was stolen from them. McWhorter interviewed and befriended Nez Perce warriors such as Yellow Wolf, who stated, "Our hearts have always been in the valley of the Wallowa".

Robert Forczyk states in his book Nez Perce 1877: The Last Fight that the tipping point of the war was that "Joseph responded that his clan's traditions would not allow him to cede the Wallowa Valley". The band led by Chief Joseph never signed the treaty moving them to the Idaho reservation. General Howard, who was dispatched to deal with Chief Joseph and the Nez Perce, tended to believe the Nez Perce were right about the treaty: "the new treaty finally agreed upon excluded the Wallowa, and vast regions besides".

For over three months, the Nez Perce deftly outmaneuvered and battled their pursuers, traveling more than 1,170 miles (1,880 km) across present-day Oregon, Washington, Idaho, Wyoming, and Montana. One of those battles was led by Captain Perry and two cavalry companies of the U.S. Army led by Captain Trimble and Lieutenant Theller, who engaged Chief Joseph and his people at White Bird Canyon on June 17, 1877. The Nez Perce repelled the attack, killing 34 soldiers, while suffering only three Nez Perce wounded. The Nez Perce continued to repel the Army's advances, eventually reaching the Clearwater River, where they united with another Nez Perce chief, Looking Glass, and his group, bringing the size of their party to 740, though only 200 of these were warriors. The final battle of the Nez Perce War occurred approximately 40 miles (64 km) south of the Canadian border where the Nez Perce were camped on Snake Creek near the Bears Paw Mountains, close to present-day Chinook in Blaine County, Montana. A U.S. Army detachment commanded by General Nelson A. Miles and accompanied by Cheyenne scouts intercepted the Nez Perce on September 30 at the Battle of Bear Paw. After his initial attacks were repelled, Miles violated a truce and captured Chief Joseph; however, he would later be forced to exchange Chief Joseph for one of his captured officers.

General Howard arrived on October 3, leading the opposing cavalry, and was impressed with the skill with which the Nez Perce fought, using advance and rear guards, skirmish lines, and field fortifications. Following a devastating five-day siege during freezing weather, with no food or blankets and the major war leaders dead, Chief Joseph formally surrendered to General Miles on the afternoon of October 5, 1877. The battle is remembered in popular history by the speech attributed to Joseph, as reported by Lieutenant Charles Erskine Scott Wood:

Tell General Howard I know his heart. What he told me before, I have it in my heart. I am tired of fighting. Our chiefs are killed; Looking Glass is dead, Too-hul-hul-sote is dead. The old men are all dead. It is the young men who say yes or no. He who led on the young men is dead. It is cold, and we have no blankets; the little children are freezing to death. My people, some of them, have run away to the hills, and have no blankets, no food. No one knows where they are—perhaps freezing to death. I want to have time to look for my children, to see how many I can find. Maybe I shall find them among the dead. Hear me, my chiefs! I am tired; my heart is sick and sad. From where the sun now stands, I will fight no more forever.

Mark Herbert Brown writes that "The story that Joseph surrendered his rifle with this touching little speech, while Wood stood by 'with a pencil and a paper pad' to record it, does not have a word of truth in it."

Although Joseph was not technically a war chief and probably did not command the retreat, many of the chiefs who did had died. His speech brought attention, and therefore credit, his way. He earned the praise of General William Tecumseh Sherman and became known in the press as "The Red Napoleon". However, as Francis Haines argues in Chief Joseph and the Nez Perce Warrior, the battlefield successes of the Nez Perce during the war were due to the individual successes of the Nez Perce men and not that of the fabled military genius of Chief Joseph. Haines supports his argument by citing L. V. McWhorter, who concluded "that Chief Joseph was not a military man at all, that on the battlefield he was without either skill or experience". Furthermore, Merle Wells argues in The Nez Perce and Their War that the interpretation of the Nez Perce War of 1877 in military terms as used in the United States Army's account distorts the actions of the Nez Perce. Wells supports his argument: "The use of military concepts and terms is appropriate when explaining what the whites were doing, but these same military terms should be avoided when referring to Indian actions; the United States use of military terms such as 'retreat' and 'surrender' has created a distorted perception of the Nez Perce War, to understand this may lend clarity to the political and military victories of the Nez Perce."

== Aftermath ==
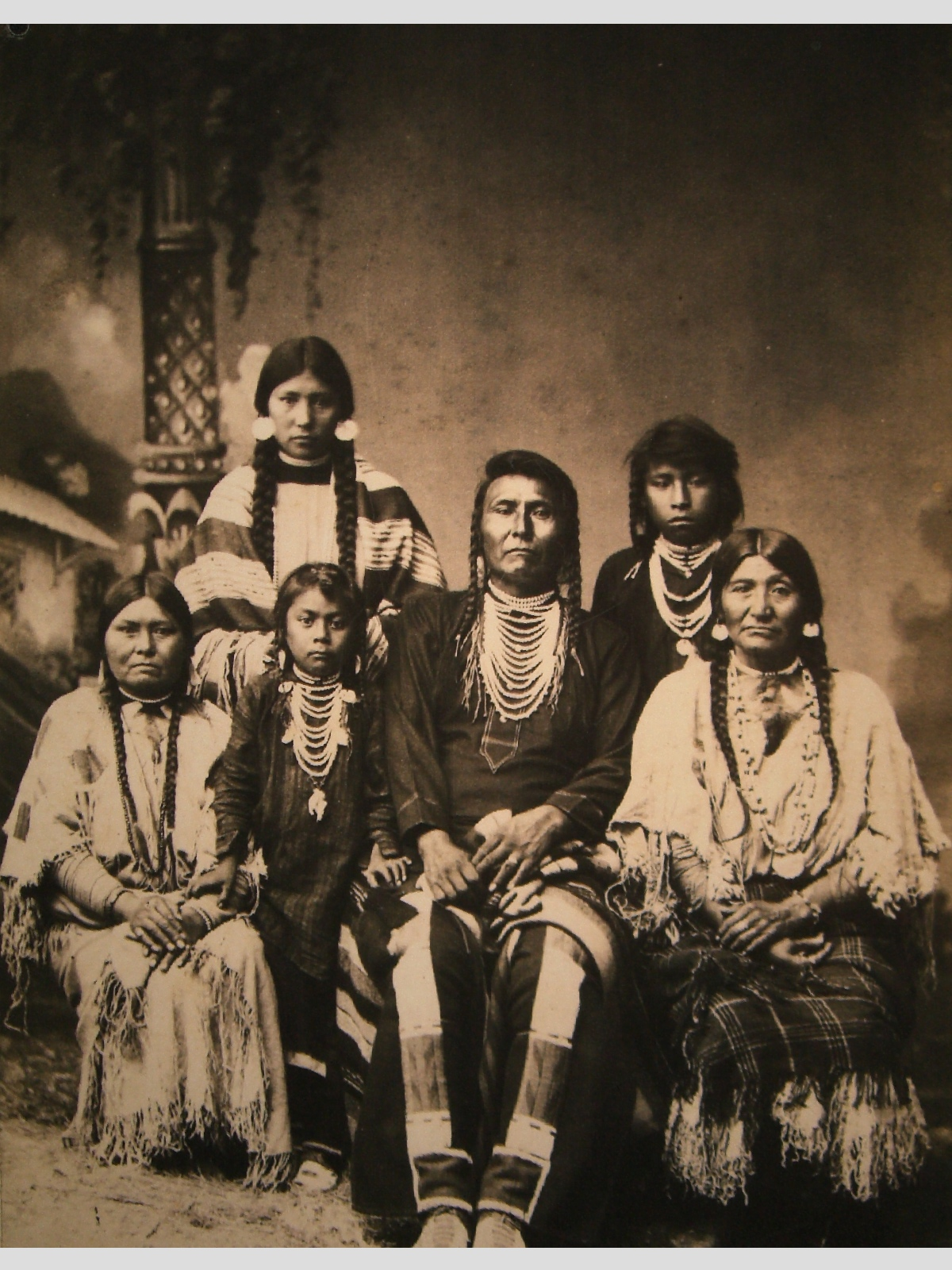
Chief Joseph and family, c. 1880

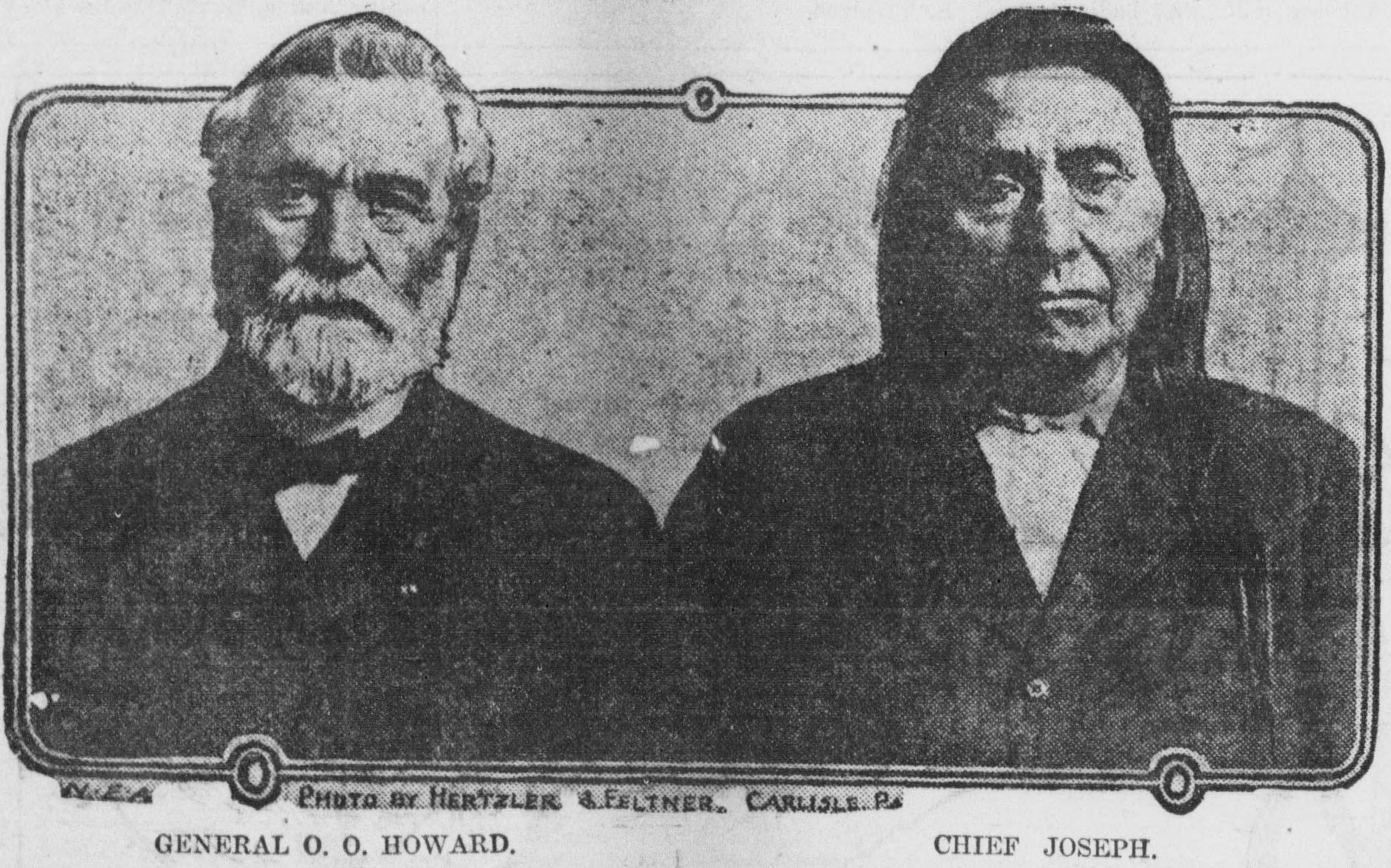
Oliver O. Howard and Chief Joseph (1904)

By the time Joseph had surrendered, 150 of his followers had been killed or wounded. Their plight, however, did not end. Although Joseph had negotiated with Miles and Howard for a safe return home for his people, General Sherman overruled this decision and forced Joseph and 400 followers to be taken on unheated rail cars to Fort Leavenworth, in eastern Kansas, where they were held in a prisoner of war campsite for eight months. Toward the end of the following summer, the surviving Nez Perce were taken by rail to a reservation in the Indian Territory (now Oklahoma); they lived there for seven years. Many of them died of epidemic diseases while there.

In 1879, Chief Joseph went to Washington, D.C. to meet with President Rutherford B. Hayes and plead his people's case. Although Joseph was respected as a spokesman, opposition in Idaho prevented the U.S. government from granting his petition to return to the Pacific Northwest. Finally, in 1885, Chief Joseph and his followers were granted permission to return to the Pacific Northwest to settle on the reservation around Kooskia, Idaho. Instead, Joseph and others were taken to the Colville Indian Reservation in Nespelem, Washington, far from both their homeland in the Wallowa Valley and the rest of their people in Idaho.

Joseph continued to lead his Wallowa band on the Colville Reservation, at times coming into conflict with the leaders of the 11 other unrelated tribes also living on the reservation. Chief Moses of the Sinkiuse-Columbia, in particular, resented having to cede a portion of his people's lands to Joseph's people, who had "made war on the Great Father".

In his last years, Joseph spoke eloquently against the injustice of United States policy toward his people and held out the hope that America's promise of freedom and equality might one day be fulfilled for Native Americans as well. In 1897, he visited Washington, D.C. again to plead his case. He rode with Buffalo Bill in a parade honoring former President Ulysses Grant in New York City, but he was a topic of conversation for his traditional headdress more than his mission.

In 1903, Chief Joseph visited Seattle, a booming young town, where he stayed in the Lincoln Hotel as guest to Edmond Meany, a history professor at the University of Washington. It was there that he also befriended Edward Curtis, the photographer, who took one of his most memorable and well-known photographs. Joseph also visited President Theodore Roosevelt in Washington, D.C. the same year. Everywhere he went, it was to make a plea for what remained of his people to be returned to their home in the Wallowa Valley, but it never happened.

== Death ==
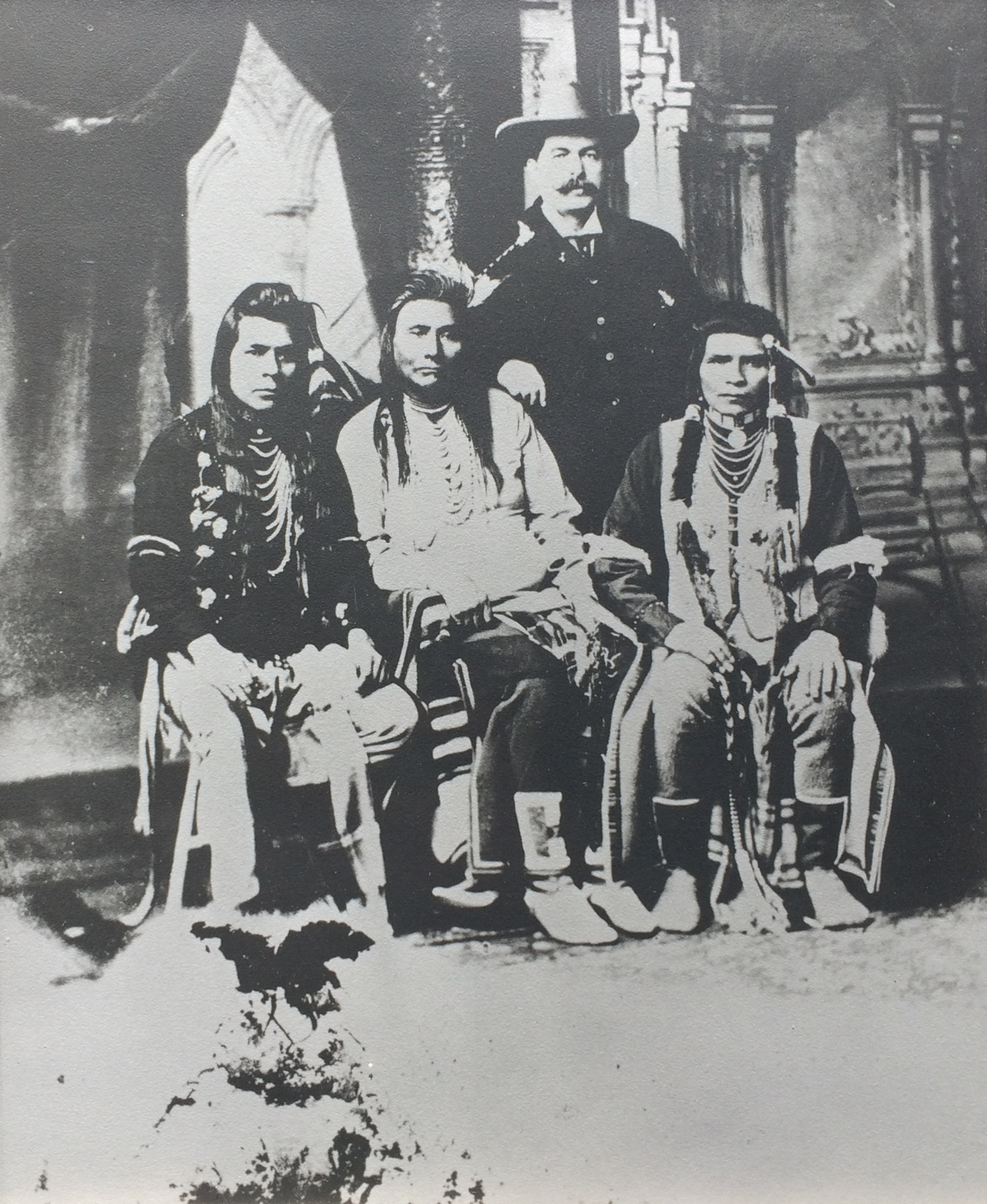
Chief Joseph in a group photo the year before his death

An indomitable voice of conscience for the West, still in exile from his homeland, Chief Joseph died on September 21, 1904, according to his doctor, "of a broken heart". Meany and Curtis helped Joseph's family bury their chief near the village of Nespelem, Washington, where many of his tribe's members still live.

== Legacy ==
The Chief Joseph band of Nez Perce who still live on the Colville Reservation bear his name in tribute.

=== Notable dramatic works ===
- I Will Fight No More Forever (1975), a historical drama film starring Ned Romero.
- Buffalo Bill and the Indians, or Sitting Bull's History Lesson (1976), Robert Altman's revisionist Western film based on the Broadway play Indians.
- From 1969 to 1970, actor George Mitchell played Chief Joseph on Broadway in the play Indians.

=== Literary works ===
- Merrill Beal's I Will Fight No More Forever: Chief Joseph and the Nez Perce War (2000) was positively received both regionally and nationally.
- Chief Joseph is sympathetically portrayed in Will Henry's novel of the Nez Perce War, From Where the Sun Now Stands (1959). The book won the 1960 Western Writers of America Spur Award for Best Novel of the West.
- Helen Hunt Jackson recorded one early Oregon settler's tale of her encounter with Joseph in her Glimpses of California and the Missions (1902):

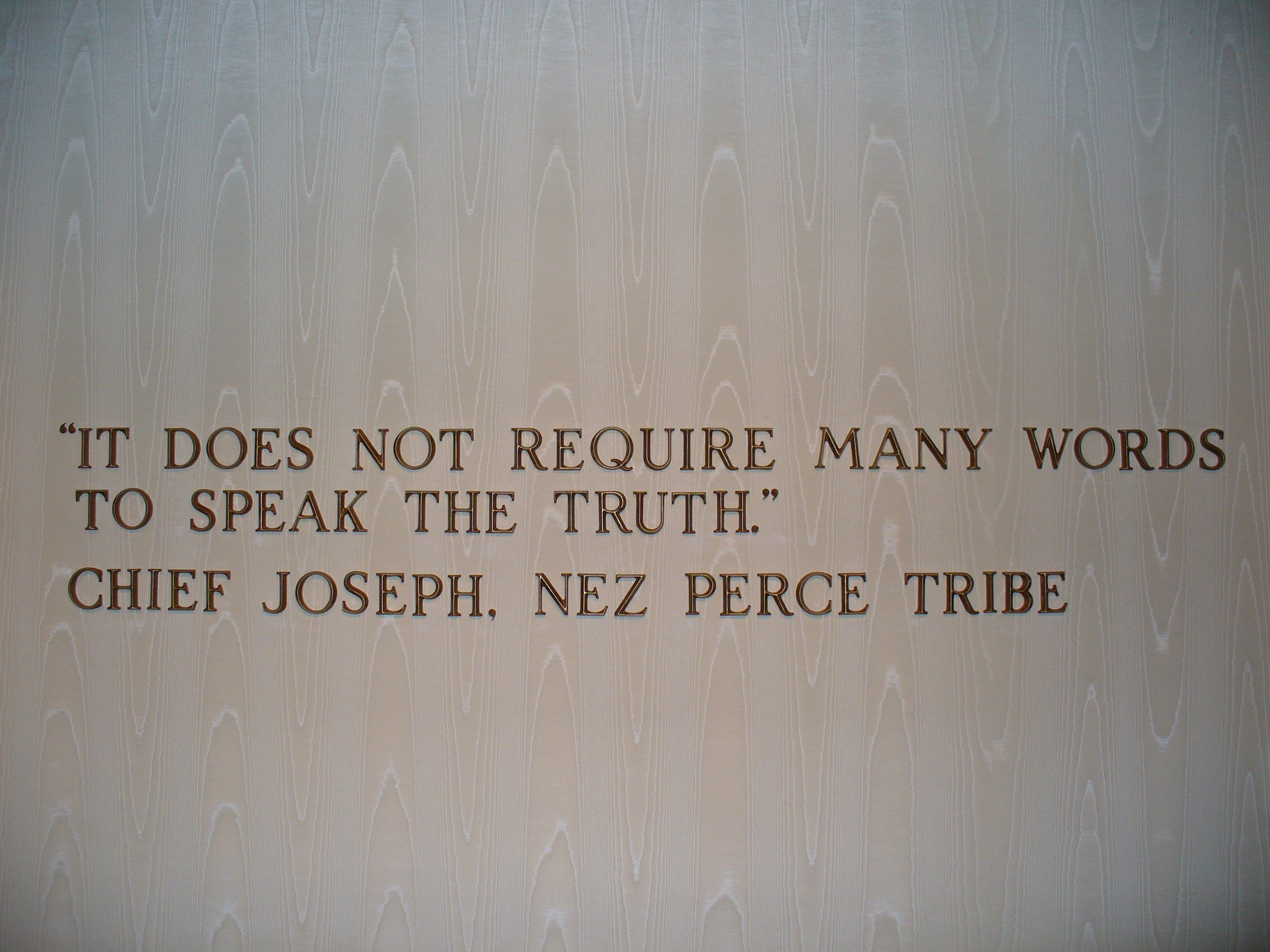
A wall-mounted quote by Chief Joseph in The American Adventure in the World Showcase pavilion of Walt Disney World's Epcot

Why I got lost once, an' I came right on Chief Joseph's camp before I knowed it ... 't was night, 'n' I was kind o' creepin' along cautious, an' the first thing I knew there was an Injun had me on each side, an' they jest marched me up to Jo's tent, to know what they should do with me ... Well; 'n' they gave me all I could eat, 'n' a guide to show me my way, next day, 'n' I could n't make Jo nor any of 'em take one cent. I had a kind o' comforter o' red yarn, I wore rund my neck; an' at last I got Jo to take that, jest as a kind o' momento.

- In the children's fiction book, Thunder Rolling in the Mountains, by Newbery medalist Scott O'Dell and Elizabeth Hall, the story of Chief Joseph is told by Joseph's daughter, Sound of Running Feet.
- The saga of Chief Joseph is depicted in Robert Penn Warren's poem "Chief Joseph of the Nez Perce" (1982).
- Chief Joseph appears in The Secret History of Twin Peaks by Mark Frost. In his speech, Chief Joseph says that he visited "the place known to our [his tribe's] ancestors, seldom visited, the place of smoke by the great falls and twin mountains, to seek the aid of the Great Spirit Chief in this time of need" in a speech he gives to his people before the retreat, in 1877.

=== Memorials and commemorations ===
Multiple man-made items and geographic features have been named for Chief Joseph, such as:

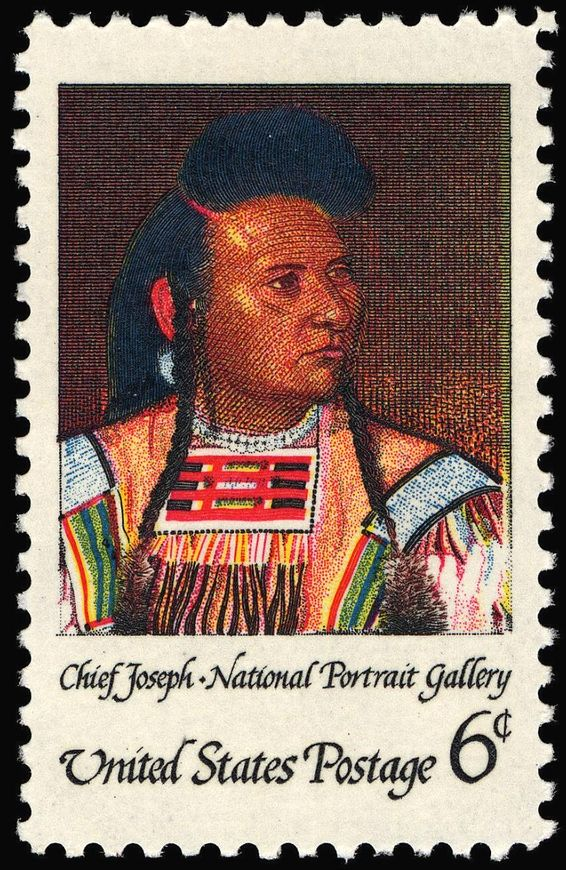
On November 4, 1968, the U.S. Post Office issued a commemorative stamp in honor of Chief Joseph

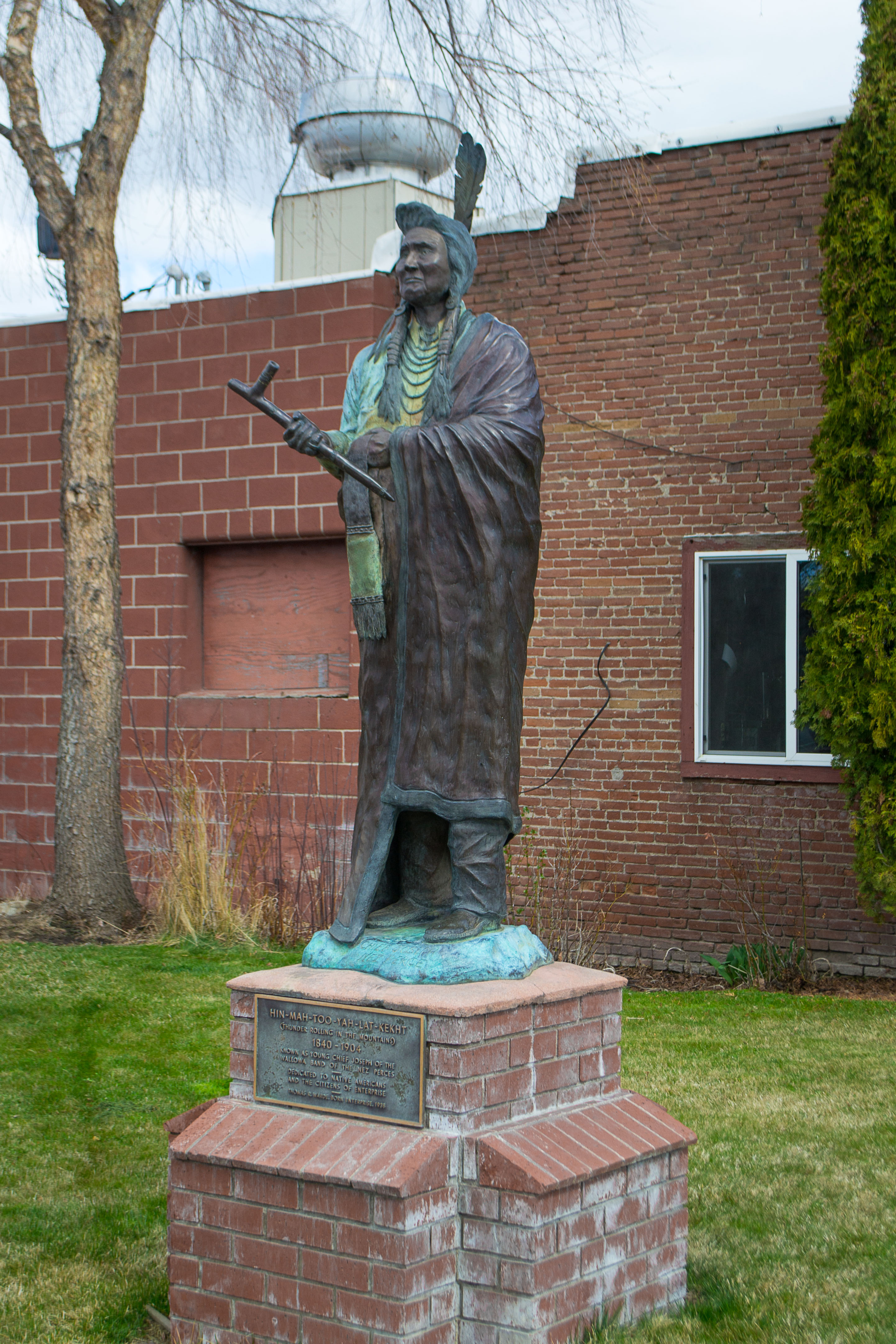
A statue of Young Chief Joseph in Enterprise, Oregon

- Chief Joseph Mountain, near Joseph, Oregon
- Chief Joseph middle school in Richland, WA
- Chief Joseph Elementary School in Portland, OR
- A statue of Young Chief Joseph in Enterprise, Oregon
- A wall-mounted quote by Joseph in The American Adventure in the World Showcase pavilion of Walt Disney World's Epcot
- Chief Joseph Pass in Montana
- Chief Joseph Elementary School in Great Falls, Montana.
- Chief Joseph Middle School in Bozeman, Montana
- The city of Joseph, Oregon, home of Chief Joseph Days festival.
- Joseph Canyon, in northern Wallowa County, Oregon, and southern Asotin County, Washington
- Joseph Creek, on the Oregon–Washington border
- Chief Joseph Scenic Byway in Wyoming
- Chief Joseph Dam on the Columbia River in Washington, the second-largest hydroelectric power producer in the U.S. and the only dam in the Northwest named after an American Indian
- Chief Joseph is depicted on previously issued $200 Series United States Savings Bonds
- Chief Joseph Ranch south of Darby, Montana is depicted as the Dutton Ranch on the hit series Yellowstone, starring Kevin Costner.
- Chief Joseph School of the Arts, Meridian, ID
- Chief Joseph Trail Ride, an annual horse trail ride following his route during the Nez Perce War
- Chief Joseph Dike Swarm, a collection of igneous dikes

=== Tributes in music ===
Bryan Adam's song "Native Son", from his 1987 album Into the Fire is based on Chief Joseph's story.

In 2014, Micky and the Motorcars released the album Hearts from Above, which included the song "From Where the Sun Now Stands". The song contains several references to his famous speech.

Swedish country pop group Rednex sampled a part of his famous speech in their 2000 single The Spirit of the Hawk, which became a worldwide hit.

In his 2000 release Something Old, Something New, Something Borrowed...And Some Blues, Dan Fogelberg mentioned Chief Joseph in the song "Don't Let That Sun Go Down," which was recorded live in 1994 in Knoxville, TN.

In 1983, Fred Small released "The Heart of the Appaloosa".

=== Halls of fame ===
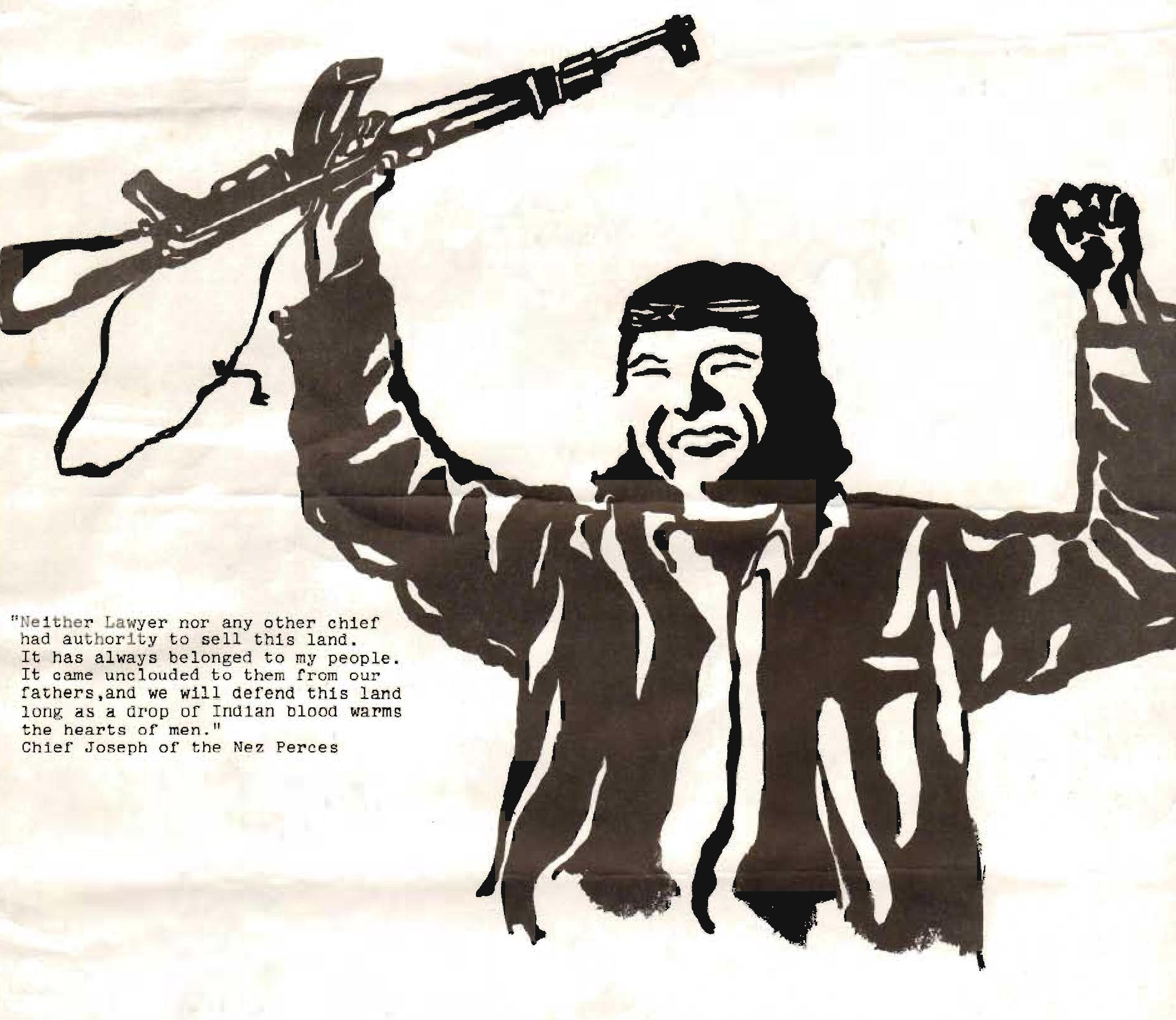
Chief Joseph memorialized in New Communist Movement publication Seize the Time, 1974

In 1973, he was inducted into the Hall of Great Westerners of the National Cowboy & Western Heritage Museum.

=== Other ===
In June 2012, Chief Joseph's 1870s war shirt was sold to a private collection for the sum of $877,500.

- Chief Joseph is depicted in the Audio-Animatronic show The American Adventure at Walt Disney World's Epcot, voiced by Dehl Berti. In it, he interrupts narrators Benjamin Franklin and Mark Twain to speak out against the mistreatment of Native American people throughout the nation's history.
