= Farm, Field, and Fireside =

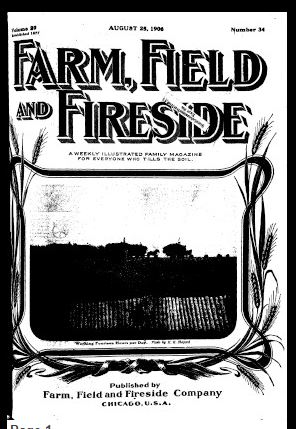
- Front cover of Farm, Field and Fireside (August 25, 1906)
- Type: Weekly and monthly newspaper
- Editor: Charles Henry Howard
- Founded: 1900
- Headquarters: Chicago, Illinois

Farm, Field and Fireside was a monthly and later weekly newspaper published in the 20th century which offered advice through articles about farming and homemaking. It was published by Charles Henry Howard of the Howard Company in Chicago, Illinois. Its slogan was: "A weekly illustrated family magazine for everyone who tills the soil".
