= Waldo =

Waldo may refer to:

== People and fictional characters ==
- Waldo (given name), a list of people and fictional characters
- Waldo (surname), a list of people and fictional characters
- Waldo (footballer), Brazilian footballer Waldo Machado da Silva (1934–2019)
- Waldo (musician), Finnish eurodance musician Marko Reijonen (born 1967)

== Places ==
=== Canada ===
- Waldo, British Columbia, a ghost town

=== United States ===
==== Communities ====
- Waldo, Alabama, a town
- Waldo, Arkansas, a city
- Waldo, former name of Sausalito, California, a city
- Waldo Junction, California, formerly Waldo, an unincorporated community
- Waldo, Florida, a city
  - Waldo Historic District, Waldo, Florida
- Waldo, Kansas, a small town
  - Waldo Township, Russell County, Kansas, the surrounding township
- Waldo, Kansas City, Missouri, a city neighborhood
- Waldo, Magoffin County, Kentucky
- Waldo County, Maine
  - Waldo, Maine, a town
- Waldo, Missouri, an unincorporated community
- Waldo, New Mexico, an unincorporated area
- Waldo, Ohio, a village
  - Waldo Township, Marion County, Ohio, the surrounding township
- Waldo, Oregon, a ghost town
- Waldo, Wisconsin, a village

==== Other places ====
- Mount Waldo, a mountain in Maine
- Waldo Hills, a range of hills in Oregon
- Waldo Lake, a freshwater lake in Oregon
- Waldo Mountain, a summit in Oregon
- Waldo Park, a municipal park in Salem, Oregon
- WALDO (Work And Live District Overlay), a newer name for the Powerhouse Arts District, Jersey City, New Jersey

== Arts and entertainment ==
- Waldo (novel), a 1967 novel by Paul Theroux
- "Waldo" (short story), by Robert A. Heinlein

== Transportation ==
- Waldo (Amtrak station), a former train station in Waldo, Florida
- Waldo Grade, a highway grade between the Golden Gate Bridge and Marin City, California
  - Waldo Tunnel, now the Robin Williams Tunnel, at the highest point of the grade

== Other uses ==
- Tropical Storm Waldo (disambiguation)
- Waldo, another name for a remote manipulator
- Waldo Block, Portland, Oregon, a commercial building on the National Register of Historic Places
- Waldo Stadium, Western Michigan University
- Waldo Theatre, Waldoboro, Maine, on the National Register of Historic Places
- Waldo Water Tower (disambiguation)
- Waldo (bivalve), a genus of mollusc
- SS George E. Waldo, a World War II Liberty ship

== See also ==
- Walto (disambiguation)
- Valdo (disambiguation)
