= Three Fingered Jack =

Mountain in United States of America

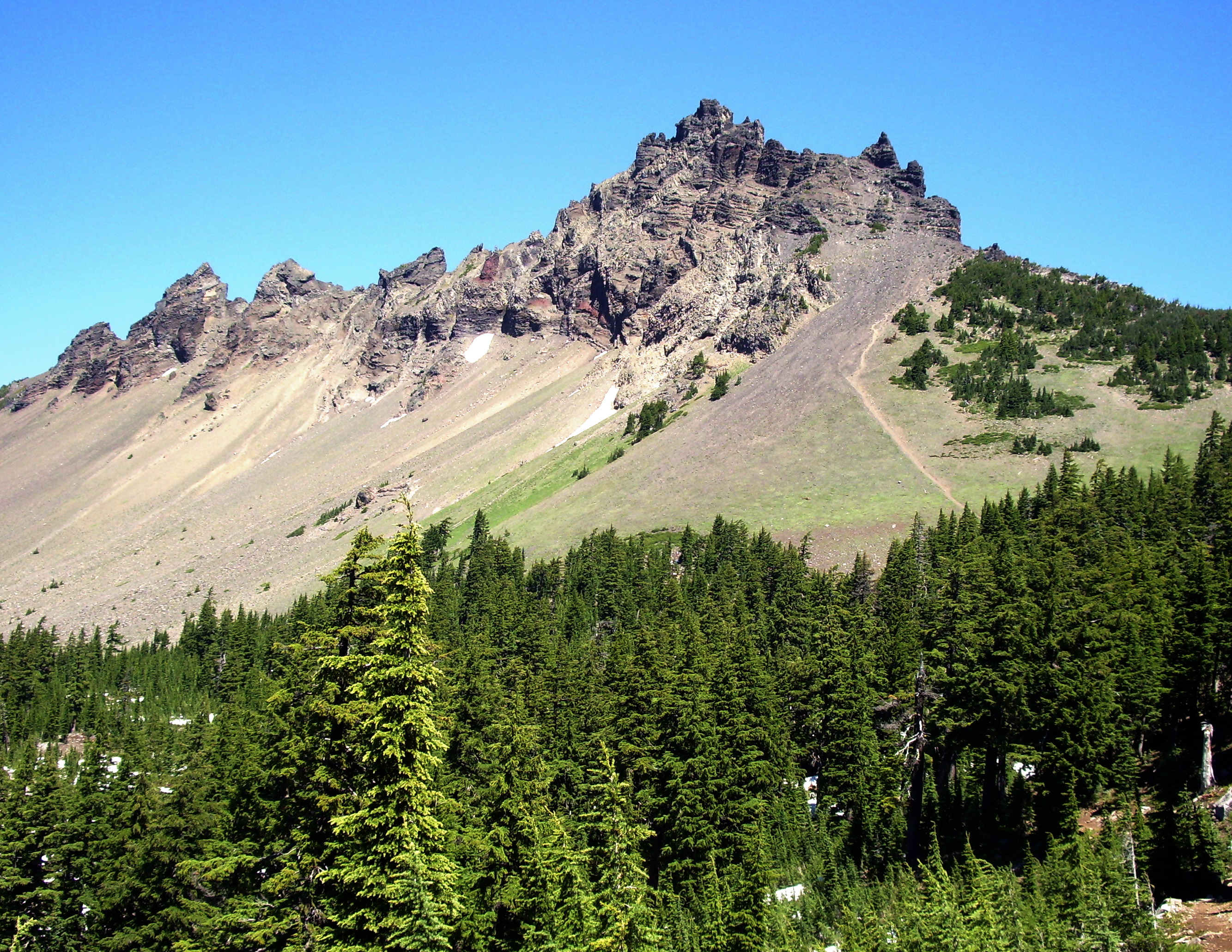
- Southwest side of Three Fingered Jack seen from Pacific Crest Trail

Highest point
- Elevation: 7,844 ft (2,391 m) NAVD 88
- Coordinates: 44°28′44″N 121°50′35″W

Geography
- Location within the United States Location within Oregon
- Location: Jefferson and Linn counties, Oregon, U.S.
- Parent range: Cascades
- Topo map: USGS Three Fingered Jack

Geology
- Rock age: older than 200,000 years
- Mountain type(s): Summit, Shield volcano
- Volcanic arc: Cascade Volcanic Arc
- Last eruption: Pleistocene

Climbing
- First ascent: 1923 by E. McNeal and party

Three Fingered Jack is a summit of a shield volcano of the Cascade Range in the U.S. state of Oregon. Formed during the Pleistocene epoch, the mountain consists mainly of basaltic andesite lava and was heavily glaciated in the past. While other Oregon volcanoes that were heavily glaciated—such as Mount Washington and Mount Thielsen—display eroded volcanic necks, Three Fingered Jack's present summit is a comparatively narrow ridge of loose tephra supported by a dike only 10 feet (3.0 m) thick on a generally north–south axis. Glaciation exposed radiating dikes and plugs that support this summit. The volcano has long been inactive and is highly eroded.

Three Fingered Jack has diverse flora, fauna, and fungi. The Molala people, one of the indigenous groups in the northwestern United States, historically inhabited the area around the volcano. Not much is known about Molala culture, other than that the group fished for salmon and collected berries, fruits, obsidian, and dried herbs. David Douglas was the first person of non-indigenous descent to reach the area in 1825, followed by Peter Skene Ogden the following year. The first group to ascend the volcano reached its summit in September 1923. Three Fingered Jack can still be climbed, but climbers can require rescue after becoming disoriented in low visibility conditions.

== Geography ==
Three Fingered Jack lies in the U.S. state of Oregon, in Linn and Jefferson counties. It has a volume of 2.4 cubic miles (10 km^{3}) and a summit elevation of 7,844 feet (2,391 m), (Note: Sources disagree on the volcano's height; the National Oceanic and Atmospheric Administration and Global Volcanism Program lists it at 7,844 feet (2,391 m), Wood and Kienle (1990) list its elevation as 7,840 feet (2,390 m), and the Geographic Names Information System lists it at 6,959 feet (2,121 m).) with a proximal topographic relief of 1,300 feet (400 m) and a draping relief of 4,600 feet (1,400 m). (Note: According to Hildreth's definitions, proximal relief refers to the difference between the summit elevation and the highest exposure of old rocks under the main edifice, while draping relief marks the difference between the summit elevation and the edifice's lowest distal lava flows (excluding pyroclastic and debris flows).) Its jagged edifice rises between Mount Jefferson and the Three Sisters volcanic complex. Three Fingered Jack lies within the Mount Jefferson Wilderness and is only accessible on foot by trails such as the Pacific Crest Trail. Located about 20 miles (32 km) northwest of the city of Sisters, it is a prominent landmark in the area.

=== Physical geography ===
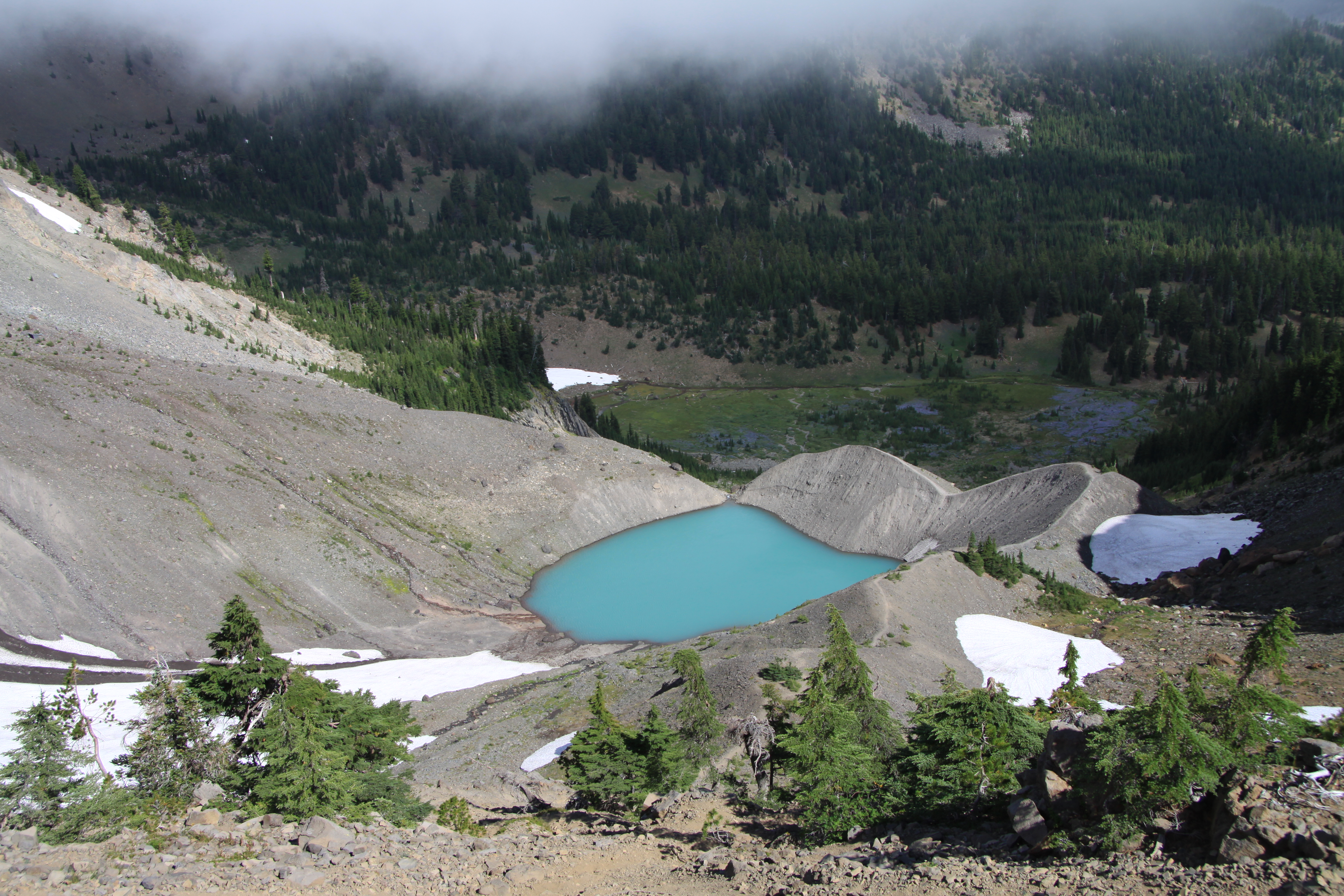
The moraine-dammed lake in summer

Lateral and terminal moraines formed on Three Fingered Jack during the last major advance of glacial ice in the area during the Wisconsin glaciation, along with glacial striations, altered vegetation patterns, and lithologies that suggest glacial transport of material. Jack Glacier (unofficially-named) is the sole glacier remaining on the volcano, located in a shaded cirque on the northeast side. The glacier resides at an unusually low altitude for the central Oregon Cascades it is protected by tall ridges to the south and west. Jack Glacier has an area of 2.5 acres (1.0 ha), though historically it has reached estimated areas of up to 32 acres (13 ha). It is likely stagnant. During the Little Ice Age, which spanned roughly 1350 to 1850, the glacier produced moraines with heights close to 200 feet (61 m), which are dotted with 1/2 to 1 foot (0.15 to 0.30 m) of ash from the Sand Mountain cinder cone chain and 1 foot (0.30 m) of ash from the Blue Lake Crater cinder cone.

The moraine for Jack Glacier dammed a lake with a volume of 940,000 cubic feet (26,500 m^{3}), a surface area of 65,900 square feet (6,120 m^{2}), and a maximum depth of 26 feet (8 m). This lake was documented in 1937, although it did not appear on United States Geological Survey topographic maps made during the 1920s. The lake sits precariously; moraines on the volcano are steep, unstable, and populated with boulders. Before September 1960, there was a partial breach of this moraine-dammed lake that covered an area of 12,000 square metres (3.0 acres) near the moraine's base. Since 1960, there have been at least three incidents in which moraine-dammed lakes on the volcano have caused floods down the slopes, including a significant flood and debris flow in 2012. Local soil is thin, and it has been buried by a layer of weathered Holocene tephra from Three Fingered Jack, which has a maximum thickness of 3.3 feet (1 m).

== Ecology ==
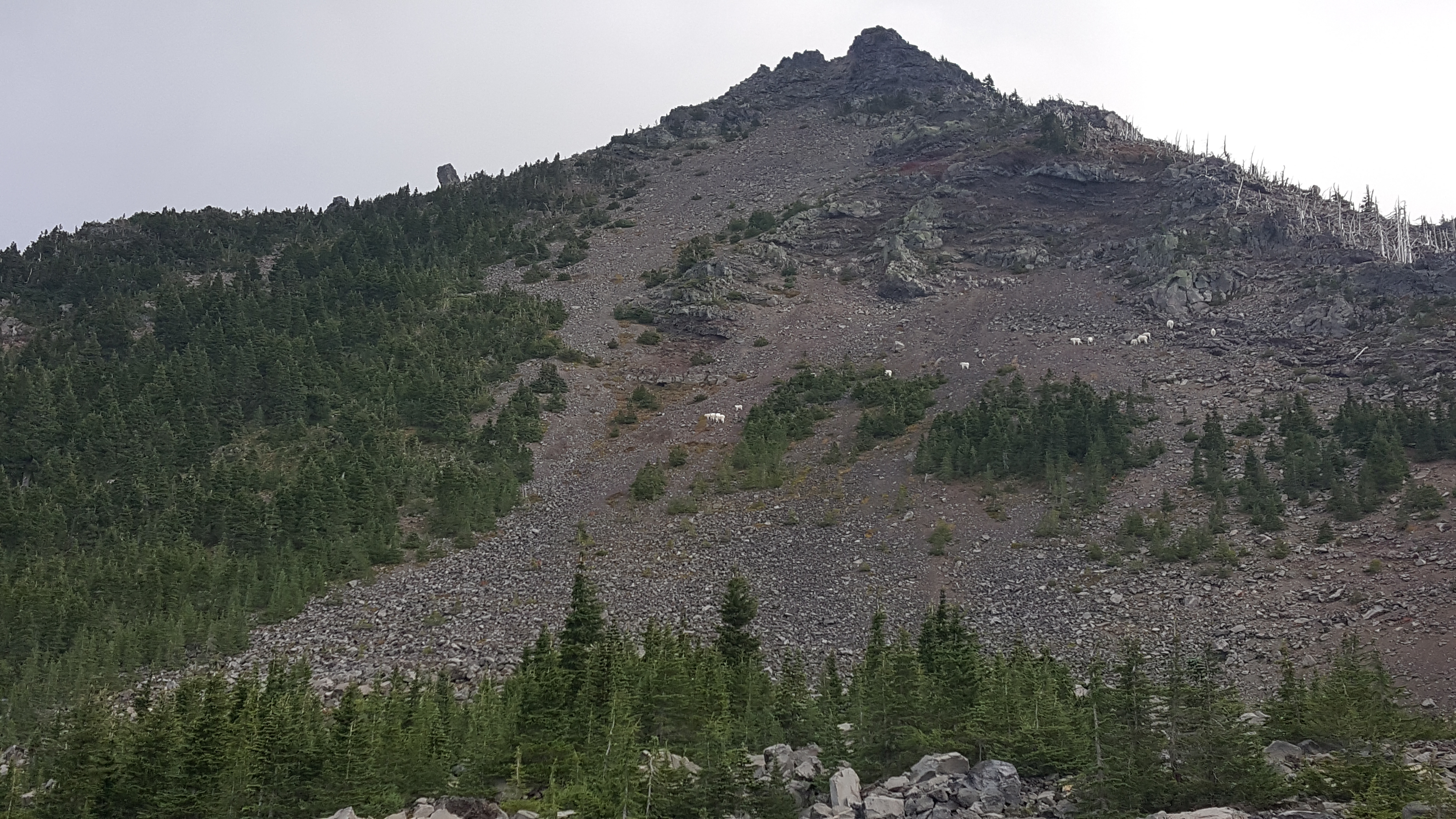
A herd of mountain goats seen on the flank of Three Fingered Jack

Douglas fir, Alpine fir, blue spruce, mountain hemlock, and bear grass can be found along the volcano and its hiking trails. Cascade parsley fern grows on Three Fingered Jack between elevations of 6,500 to 7,000 feet (2,000 to 2,100 m). There are also mountain goats in the surrounding wilderness area.

Carnivorous animals in the surrounding area include American black bears, coyotes, cougars, red foxes, raccoons, American martens, stoats (also known as ermines), long-tailed weasels, American minks, North American river otters, and bobcats. Deer species include Roosevelt elk, black-tailed deer, and mule deer; insectivores include vagrant shrews, American water shrews, and coast moles. Bats at Jefferson include little brown bats and silver-haired bats, and American pikas and snowshoe hares are also present. Rodents such as yellow-bellied marmots, mountain beavers, yellow-pine chipmunks, Townsend's chipmunks, golden-mantled ground squirrels, western gray squirrels, Douglas squirrels, mountain pocket gophers, North American beavers, deer mice, bushy-tailed woodrats, water voles, Pacific jumping mice, and North American porcupines are present.

Birds nearby include mallards, American goshawks, sharp-shinned hawks, red-tailed hawks, dusky grouse, grey partridges, killdeer, spotted sandpipers, California gulls, band-tailed pigeons, great horned owls, mountain pygmy owls, common nighthawks, rufous hummingbirds, Northern flickers, pileated woodpeckers, yellow-bellied sapsuckers, hairy woodpeckers, and white-headed woodpeckers. Other bird species found in the area consist of American three-toed woodpeckers, willow flycatchers, olive-sided flycatchers, tree swallows, Canada jays, Steller's jays, common ravens, Clark's nutcrackers, black-capped chickadees, mountain chickadees, chestnut-backed chickadees, red-breasted nuthatches, pygmy nuthatches, brown creepers, American dippers, wrens, American robins, varied thrushes, hermit thrushes, Townsend's solitaires, golden-crowned kinglets, ruby-crowned kinglets, American pipits, blue-headed vireos, western tanagers, Cassin's finches, gray-crowned rosy finches, pine siskins, red crossbills, green-tailed towhees, dark-eyed juncos, white-crowned sparrows, golden-crowned sparrows, fox sparrows, and Lincoln's sparrows. Long-toed salamanders, California giant salamanders, rough-skinned newts, tailed frogs, western toads, Pacific tree frogs, northern red-legged frogs, Oregon spotted frogs, pygmy short-horned lizards, common garter snakes, and northwestern garter snakes make up some of the amphibious and reptilian animals in the vicinity.

== Geology and subfeatures ==
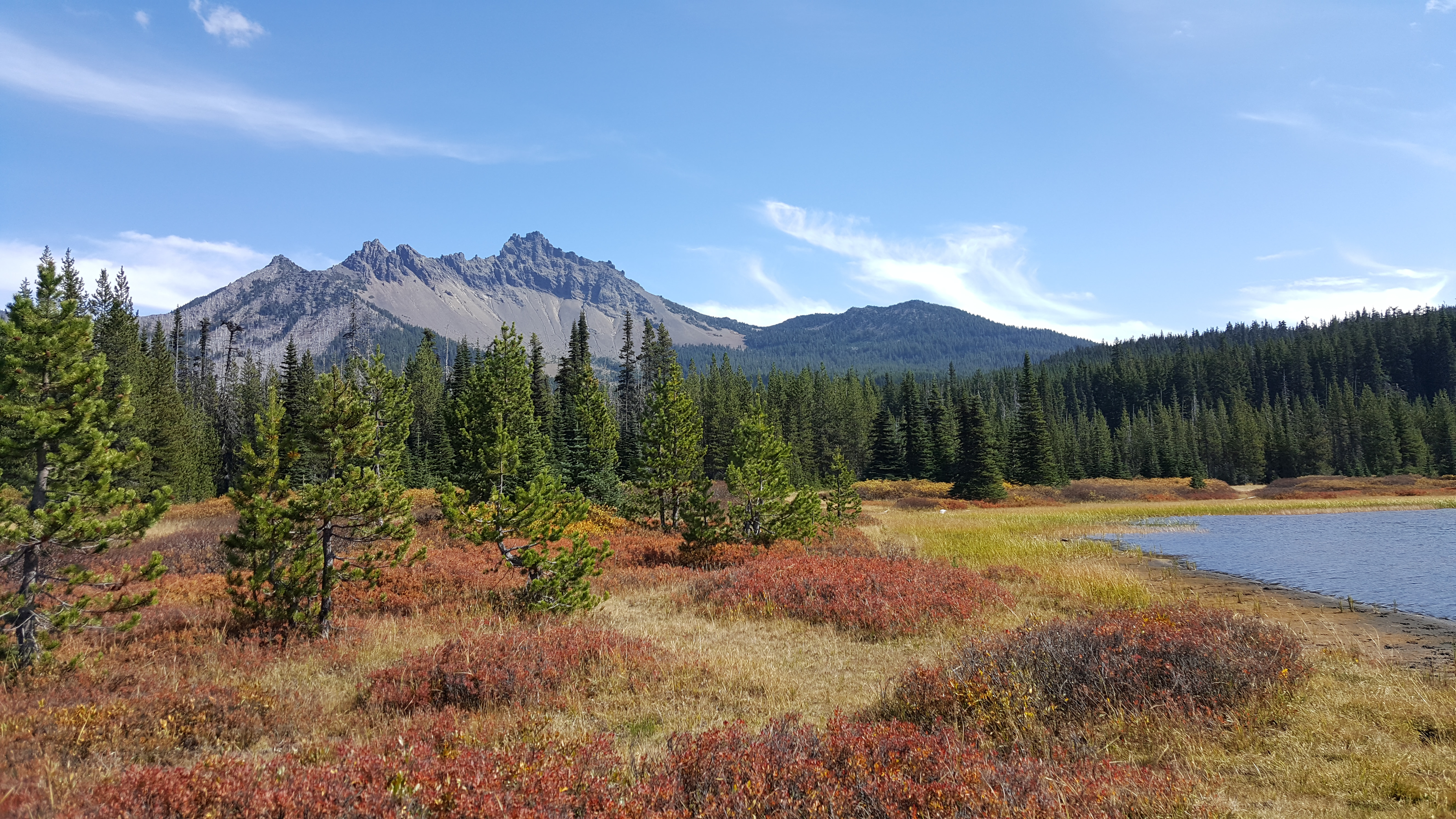
Three Fingered Jack as seen from Santiam Lake

Three Fingered Jack is a shield volcano, (Note: Hildreth (2007) lists Three Fingered Jack as a stratovolcano, as do O'Connor, Harrison, and Costa (2001) and Scott (1977).) and it is part of the group of volcanoes known as Oregon's Matterhorns, whose tall, pinnacle spires resemble the Matterhorn in Switzerland. The volcano (like Mount Thielsen, Mount Bailey, Diamond Peak, and Mount Washington) had a shorter lifespan than larger volcanoes in the Cascade Range, ceasing eruptive activity more than 100,000 years ago. Three Fingered Jack marks the northernmost point for this group. South of Mount Jefferson, the High Cascades of Oregon consist of a broad ridge produced by shield volcano activity and eruptions from cinder cones. Vents range from deeply eroded complexes to recently active volcanoes, with most of the region mantled by normally polarized rock produced within the past 730,000 years.

Three Fingered Jack is part of a group of more than 30 large shield volcanoes and stratovolcanoes that form a segment of Pleistocene-to-Holocene-epoch volcanic vents that produced mafic lava (rich in magnesium and iron). Three Fingered Jack includes several overlapping cinder cones and composite cones over underlying lava flows from shield volcano activity. These volcanic edifices and their lava flow deposits cover an area of 34 square miles (88 km^{2}).

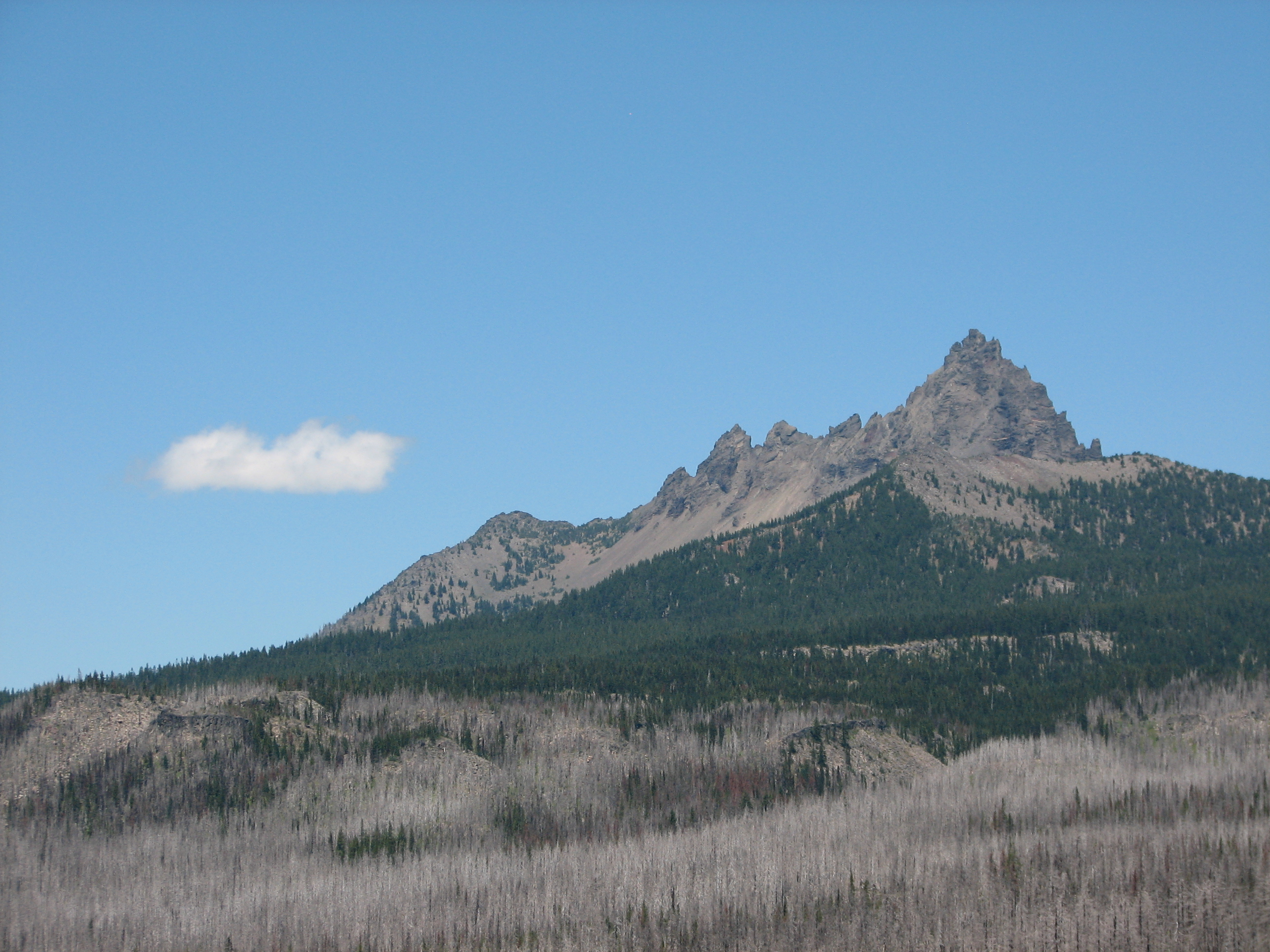
Three Fingered Jack has a desiccated, jagged appearance.

The major edifice, which consists of light gray, basaltic andesite lava flow deposits, sits 1,000 feet (300 m) to the west of the first tephra cone. Variegated pyroclastic rock is embedded among these flows. Element abundance analysis suggests that lava in the Three Fingered Jack area can be grouped into discrete units based on its source magma chamber, except for the Jorn Lake basalt produced by the underlying shield volcano and basaltic andesite erupted by Three Fingered Jack. Petrological analysis shows high and low pressures for the crystallization of these lava flow deposits, and that basaltic andesite was distinct from basalt due to longer fractionation times.

Though Three Fingered Jack does not have a high-level conduit-filling volcanic plug, its summit sits atop a pyroclastic cone. Another cone lies 350 feet (110 m) to the south of the major cone, and there are secondary craters on the sides, as well as radial dikes and volcanic plugs. Known subfeatures include two shield volcanoes, Maxwell Butte (less eroded than Three Fingered Jack) and Turpentine Peak, which have elevations of 6,230 feet (1,899 m) and 5,794 feet (1,766 m), respectively. There are six additional known volcanic cones: Duffy Butte, at an elevation of 5,837 feet (1,779 m); Hogg Rock (a tuya), at an elevation of 5,050 feet (1,540 m); Marion Mountain, at an elevation of 5,351 feet (1,631 m); Red Butte, with an elevation of 5,814 feet (1,772 m); and Marion Peak and Saddle Mountain, which do not have elevations listed. Other shield volcanoes and cinder cones that were active during the Pleistocene epoch occur to the northwest and southwest.

The volcano has a long ridge that trends from north to south. It is highly eroded; shaped like a sawtooth, it consists of tephra deposits supported by a vertical dike with a thickness of 10 feet (3.0 m). Erosion has been so extensive that climbers claim that the summit moves in the wind. During the Pleistocene epoch, glaciers exposed its inner contents, providing evidence for its eruptive history. Though it has not been dated by radiometric approaches, the volcano is likely between 500,000 and 250,000 years old, and has been carved out by at least three glacial periods.

== Eruptive history ==
Three Fingered Jack has an eruptive history similar to many High Cascade volcanoes. The first activity was the formation of a pyroclastic cone over shield volcanoes. Later eruptions formed a main volcanic cone from lava flows and more pyroclastic rock. There are dikes that radiate from a micronorite plug, which deformed tephra in the surrounding strata. The northern and southern flanks of Three Fingered Jack feature lava flows made of olivine and augite basalt.

Three Fingered Jack is estimated to be between 500,000 and 250,000 years old. It underwent more explosive eruptions as its eruptive history progressed, generating large amounts of tephra which created a loose, unconsolidated summit and upper cone. Lava flows near the summit have an average thickness of 3 feet (0.91 m). Secondary volcanic craters produced lava flows and pyroclastic material, which traveled both north and south of the volcano. Cone-building eruptions ceased before the Pleistocene epoch's glacial period, allowing the expanded glacial cover to remove most of the cone, especially on the eastern and northeastern sides.

During the ongoing Holocene epoch, there has been volcanic activity between the Three Sisters volcanoes and Three Fingered Jack. Such eruptive episodes have produced tephra and lava flows that cover several hundred square kilometers in the region. These eruptions occurred after the climactic eruption of Mount Mazama, which took place roughly 6,600 years ago.

== Human history ==
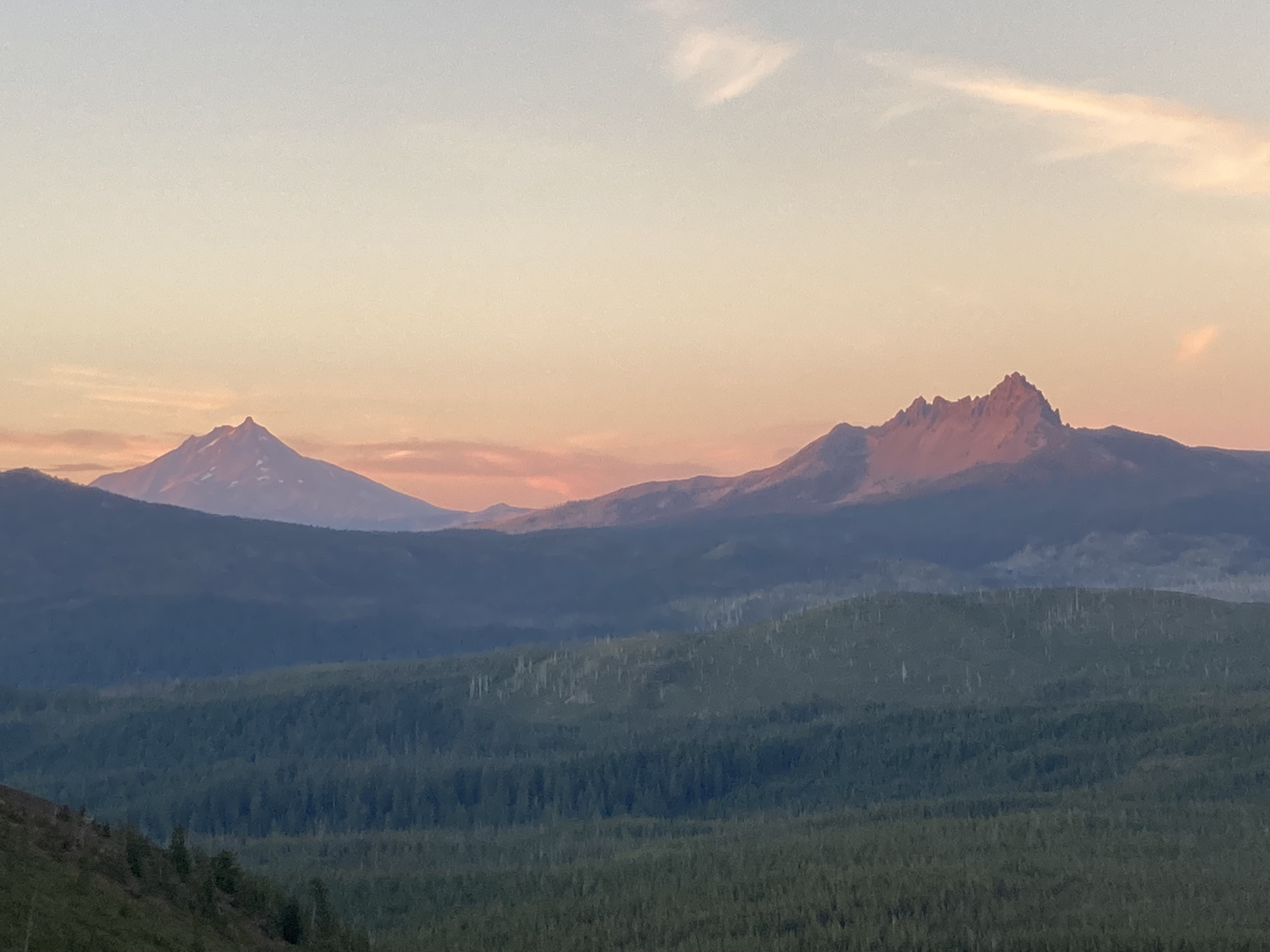
Mount Jefferson and Three Fingered Jack at sunset from Sand Mountain Lookout

The Molala people traditionally inhabited the surrounding area. The Molala fished for salmon and collected berries, fruits, obsidian, and dried herbs. Their culture was not well documented. The first person of non-indigenous descent to reach the area was David Douglas in 1825, followed by Peter Skene Ogden the following year.

Sources disagree about the affiliation of the mountain's first ascenders, some calling them "the Boys from Bend," others saying they were members of the Mazamas mountaineering club. Nonetheless, a source written by one of these first ascenders clearly states who was in the party and when they climbed. Ervin McNeal, Phil Philbrook, Armin Furrer, Wilbur Watkins, Leo Harryman, and Ronald Sellars were the first to ascend Three Fingered Jack on September 3, 1923.

The origins of Three Fingered Jack's name remain unclear. One account claims that the volcano received its name from Joaquin Murrieta, a gold miner and vaquero during the California Gold Rush also known as Three Fingered Jack. Others allege that the volcano was named after a trapper with less than five fingers on one of his hands.

== Recreation ==
Hikers can see Three Fingered Jack on trails surrounding the mountain. The Canyon Creek Meadows hiking trail begins at Jack Lake, progresses through the Mount Jefferson Wilderness, and runs for about 4.5 miles (7.2 km). It has an elevation gain of 400 feet (120 m), and is accessible to children and families. An additional connected hiking trail runs for another 3 miles (4.8 km) up the rocky glacial washout plain adjacent to the volcano, becoming steeper as it approaches Three Fingered Jack and gaining 1,400 feet (430 m) in elevation. The base can also be reached on Pacific Crest Trail which runs for 11.6 miles (18.7 km) round trip and offers views of the volcano and its summit lake. Moreover, the Three Fingered Jack loop trail runs for 20.5 miles (33.0 km) around the volcano, gaining 3,300 feet (1,000 m) in elevation.

When Three Fingered Jack's face becomes foggy, climbers have become disoriented due to the low visibility conditions of climbing the mountain, requiring rescue.

The summit can be quite dangerous due steep cliffs and poor rock quality which can result in footing and hand holds giving way without warning. One such event occurred on July 19, 2020, resulting in the death of a hiker attempting to reach the summit.

== Sources ==
- Alverson, E. R. (1989). "Cryptogramma cascadensis, a New Parsley-Fern from Western North America". American Fern Journal. 79 (3). BioOne: 95–102. doi:10.2307/1547291. JSTOR 1547291.
- Bishop, E.; Allen, J. E. (2004). Hiking Oregon's Geology. The Mountaineers Books. ISBN 978-0898868470.
- Davie, E. I. (June 1981). "The geology and petrology of Three Fingered Jack, a High Cascade volcano in central Oregon". Ore Bin. 43 (6). Oregon Department of Geology and Mineral Industries: 86.
- Dunegan, L. (2013). Hiking Oregon. Rowman & Littlefield. ISBN 978-0762780891.
- Grubbs, Bruce (1999). Hiking Oregon's Central Cascades. Guilford, Connecticut: Globe Pequot Press. ISBN 978-1560448730.
- Harris, Stephen L. (2005). Fire Mountains of the West: The Cascade and Mono Lake Volcanoes (Third ed.). Missoula, Montana: Mountain Press. ISBN 978-0878425112.
- Hildreth, W. (2007). Quaternary Magmatism in the Cascades, Geologic Perspectives. United States Geological Survey. Professional Paper 1744. Archived from the original on March 25, 2019.
- Lorain, D. (2010). One Night Wilderness: Portland: Quick and Convenient Backcountry Getaways within Three Hours of the City. Wilderness Press. ISBN 978-0899974637.
- O'Connor, J. E.; Hardison, J. H.; Costa, J. E. (2001). Debris Flows from Failures of Neoglacial-age Moraine Dams in the Three Sisters and Mount Jefferson Wilderness Areas, Oregon. United States Geological Survey. ISBN 9780607967197. Archived from the original on February 1, 2021.
- Scott, W. E. (January 1, 1977). "Quaternary glaciation and volcanism, Metolius River area, Oregon". Geological Society of America Bulletin. 88 (1). Geological Society of America: 113–124. Bibcode:1977GSAB...88..113S. doi:10.1130/0016-7606(1977)88<113:QGAVMR>2.0.CO;2.
- Sellars, Ronald (December 1923). "The Conquest of Mount Washington". Mazama. 6 (4). Portland, OR: Mazamas: 69–75. Archived from the original on January 31, 2021.
- Siebert, L.; Simkin, T.; Kimberly, P. (2010). Volcanoes of the World (3 ed.). University of California Press. ISBN 978-0520268777.
- Taylor, E. M. (1981). Johnston, D. A.; Donnelly-Nolan, J. (eds.). "Roadlog for central High Cascades geology: Bend, Sisters, McKenzie Pass, and Santiam Pass, Oregon". United States Geological Survey Circular. 838. United States Geological Survey.
- Taylor, E. M. (July 1965). "Recent volcanism between Three Fingered Jack and North Sister, Oregon Cascade Range". Ore Bin. 27 (7). Oregon Department of Geology and Mineral Industries: 121–148.
- Voth, E. (June 1963). A Survey of the Vertebrate Animals of Mount Jefferson, Oregon (Thesis). University of Oregon.
- Wood, C. A.; Kienle, J., eds. (1990). Volcanoes of North America. Cambridge University Press. ISBN 978-0521438117.
- Wuerthner, G. (2003). Oregon's Wilderness Areas: The Complete Guide. Big Earth Publishing. ISBN 978-1565794344.
