= Oregon's Matterhorns =

Subset of an informal group of volcanoes in Oregon's Cascade Range

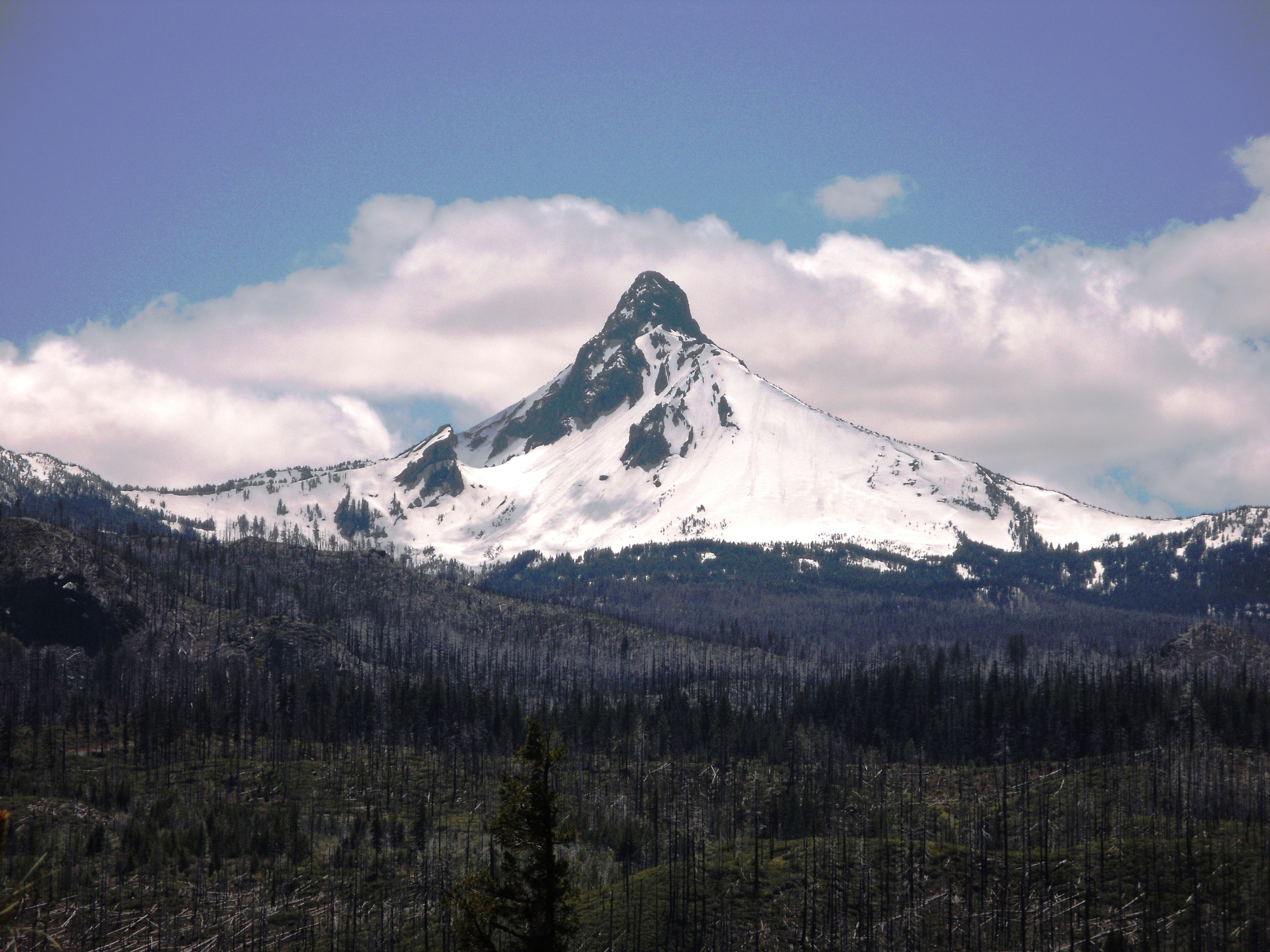
- Mount Washington, a Pleistocene volcano

Highest point
- Elevation: 9,184 ft (2,799 m) NAVD 88
- Coordinates: 45.240°N 117.301°W

Geography
- Location: United States
- Parent range: Cascade Mountains

Oregon's Matterhorns is an informal group of largely extinct volcanoes in the Cascade Range, in the American state of Oregon, named after the original Matterhorn. The Pacific Crest Trail passes near all of the volcanoes which constitute Oregon's Matterhorns.

== Origin of the name ==
Oregon's Matterhorns gained their name from Stephen Harris' book Fire Mountains of the West. The name was inspired by similarities in form to the original Matterhorn in the Alps between Switzerland and Italy.

Oregon's Matterhorns should not be confused with the peak in the Wallowa Mountains (sometimes referred to as "The Alps of Oregon") also called Matterhorn.

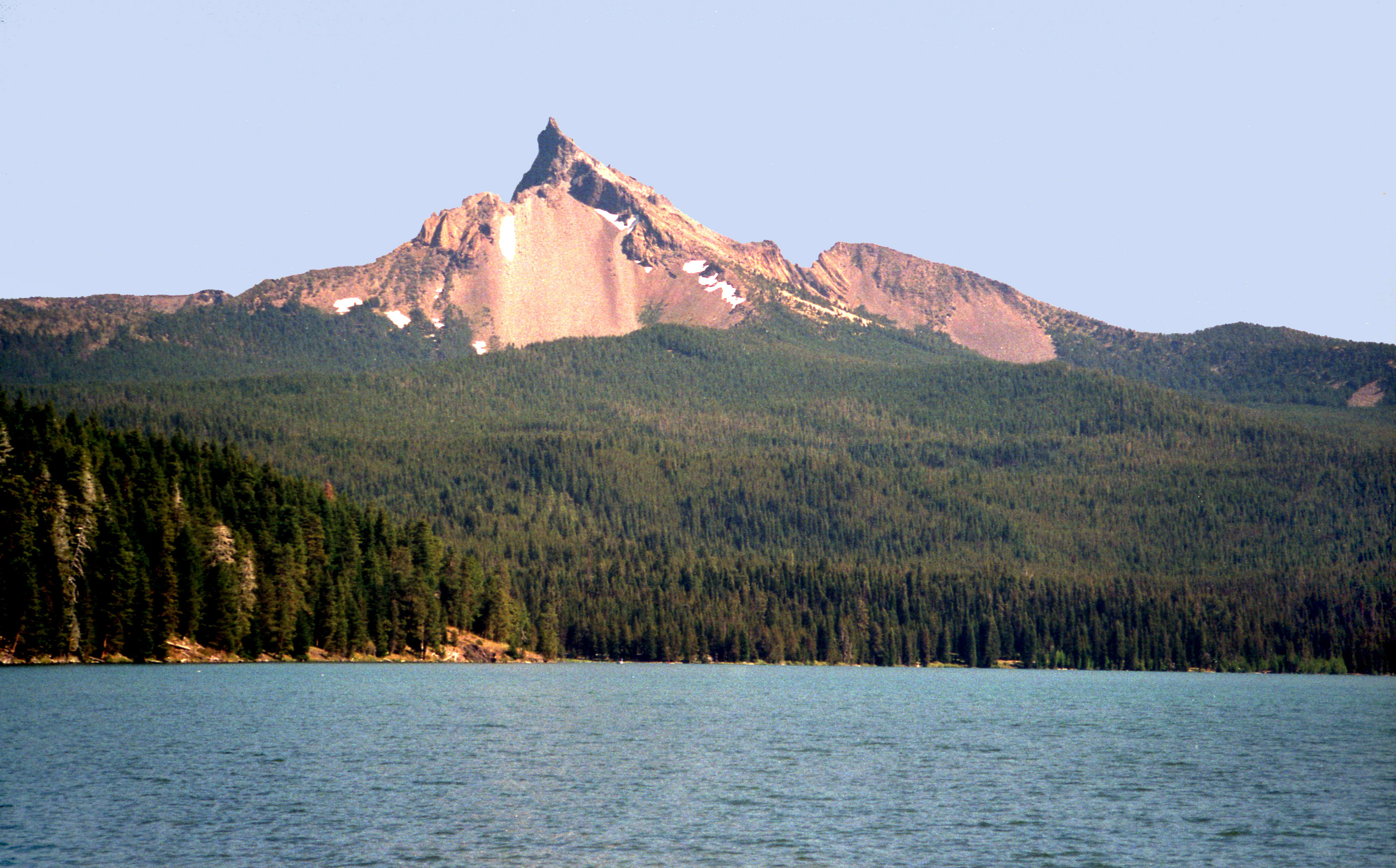
Mount Thielsen

== Mountains included ==
It is a small set including all of:

- Union Peak
- Mount Bailey
- Diamond Peak
- Mount Thielsen, The "Lightning Rod of the Cascades",
- Mount Washington
- Three Fingered Jack

== See also ==
- Deschutes National Forest
- Diamond Lake
- Diamond Peak Wilderness
- List of Oregon Wildernesses
- McKenzie Pass
- Mount Jefferson Wilderness
- Mount Thielsen Wilderness
- Mount Washington Wilderness
- Pacific Crest Trail
- Shield volcano
- Tephra cone
- Willamette National Forest

== External links and references ==
- One reference
- Stephen Harris's homepage
