= Waldef =

Waldef may refer to:

- Waldef, a variant of the name Waltheof
- Roman de Waldef, 13th-century poem
