= Mount Thielsen =

Extinct shield volcano in Oregon

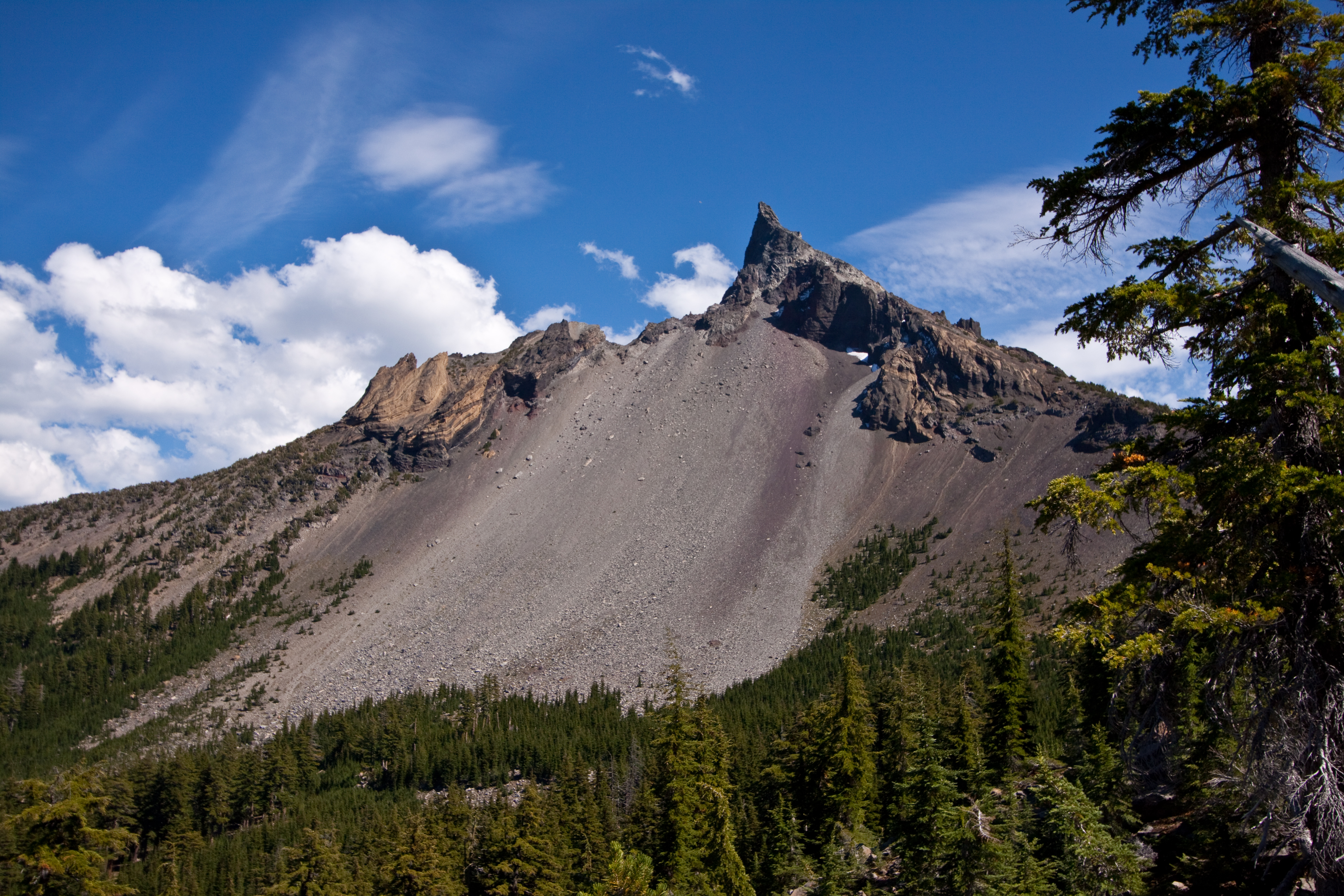
- Mount Thielsen's eroded edifice from the Pacific Crest Trail

Highest point
- Elevation: 9,184 ft (2,799 m) NAVD 88
- Prominence: 3,342 ft (1,019 m)
- Listing: Oregon county high points
- Coordinates: 43°09′10″N 122°03′59″W

Geography
- Location within Oregon
- Location: Douglas / Klamath counties Oregon, U.S.; Umpqua / Fremont–Winema national forests
- Parent range: Cascades
- Topo map: USGS Mount Thielsen

Geology
- Formed by: Subduction zone volcanism
- Rock age: About 290,000 years
- Mountain type: Shield volcano
- Volcanic arc: Cascade Volcanic Arc

Climbing
- First ascent: 1883; 143 years ago by E.E. Hayden
- Easiest route: Scramble

Mount Thielsen (Klamath: hisc’akwaleeʔas), is an extinct shield volcano in the Oregon High Cascades, near Mount Bailey. Because eruptive activity ceased 250,000 years ago, glaciers have heavily eroded the volcano's structure, creating precipitous slopes and a horn-like peak. The spire-like shape of Thielsen attracts lightning strikes and creates fulgurite, an unusual mineral. The prominent horn forms a centerpiece for the Mount Thielsen Wilderness, a reserve for recreational activities such as skiing and hiking. Thielsen is one of Oregon's Matterhorns.

Thielsen was produced by subduction of the Juan de Fuca Plate under the North American Plate. Volcanism near the Cascades dates back to 55 million years ago (mya), and extends from British Columbia to California. Thielsen is part of the High Cascades, a branch of the main Cascades range that includes several Oregon volcanoes less than 3.5 million years old; it is also a member of a group of extinct volcanoes distinguished by their sharp peaks.

The area surrounding the volcano was originally inhabited by Klamath Native Americans, and was later encountered by settlers. One of the visitors was Jon Hurlburt, an early explorer of the area who named the volcano after the engineer Hans Thielsen. Later explorers discovered nearby Crater Lake. The volcano was not analyzed until 1884, when a team from the United States Geological Survey sampled its fulgurite deposits.

== History ==
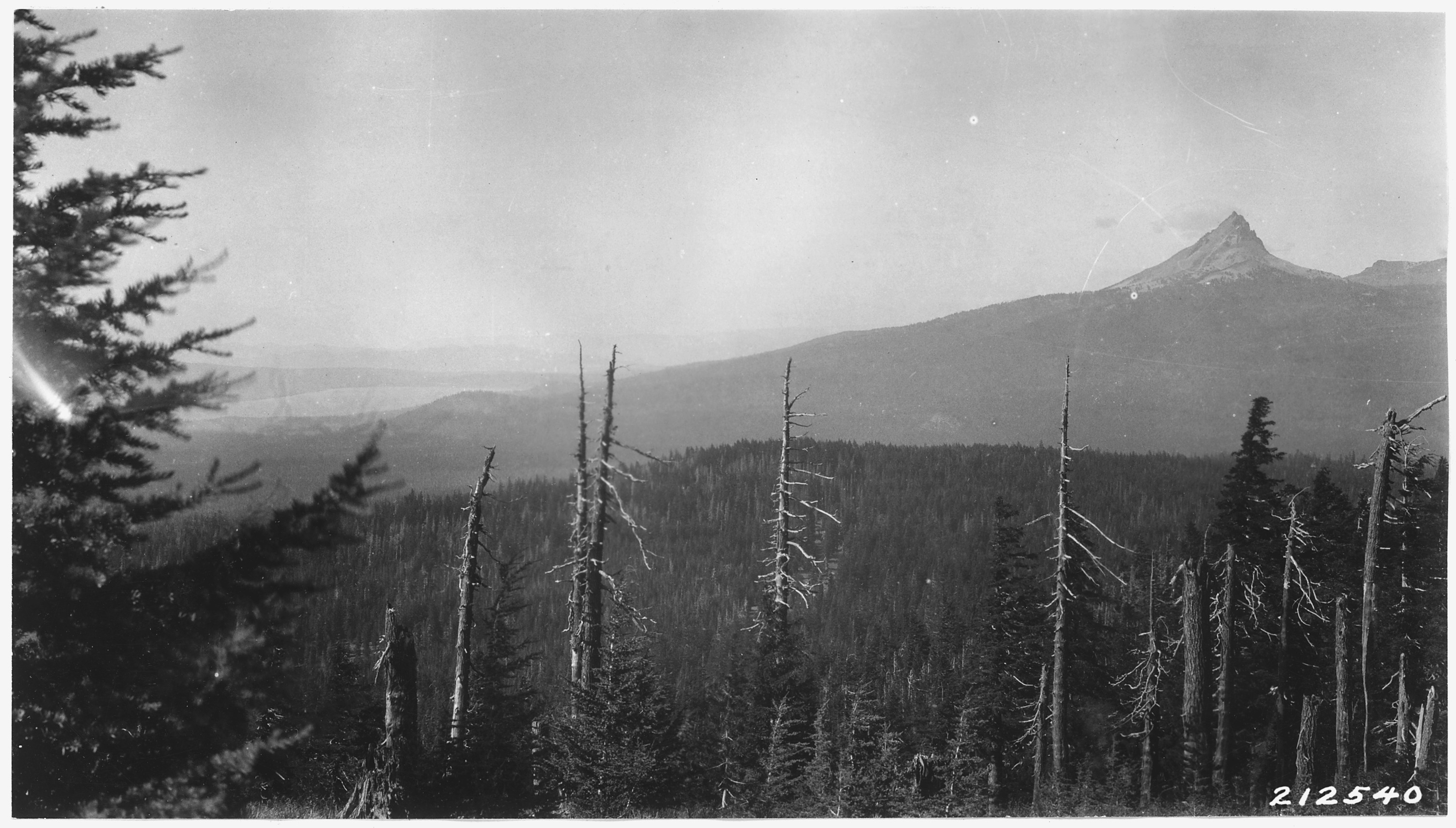
Mount Thielsen seen from the south in the 1930s

The area was originally inhabited by Chinook Native Americans, who referred to the mountain as "Hischokwolas"; the Klamath call it "hisc'akwaleeas". Jon Hurlburt, a Polish explorer, renamed the volcano after Hans Thielsen, a railroad engineer and builder who played a major role in the construction of the California and Oregon Railroad.

In 1884 a United States Geological Survey team headed by J. S. Diller began studying the mountains of the Cascade Range. Their intended destinations included Thielsen, which was climbed and sampled for its fulgurite variant. Thielsen's spire-like top is hit by lightning so frequently that some rocks on the summit have melted into a rare mineraloid known as lechatelierite, a variety of fulgurite. The mountain has earned the nickname "the lightning rod of the Cascades".

Apart from study, Thielsen and the rest of the Crater Lake area features heavily into 19th- and early 20th century exploration. In 1853, miners from Yreka first described Crater Lake; one called it "the bluest water he had ever seen", another "deep blue lake". The first published description was written by Chauncy Nye for the Jacksonville Sentinel in 1862. Nye recalled an expedition of gold prospectors where they passed a lake of a deep blue color. Native Americans lived in the area and grew irritable towards new settlers in the area. In 1865, Fort Klamath was built as a protective sanctuary. A wagon road was built to connect the Rogue Valley to the fort. In late 1865, two hunters ventured upon the lake; more explorers followed. By then, the lake became famous for its distinctive color, and crowds flocked to see it. The first known non-Native American to stand on the shore of Crater Lake was Sergeant Orsen Stearns, who climbed down into the caldera. A friend, Captain F.B. Sprague, gave it the name "Lake Majesty". Tourism continued until May 22, 1902; on that day, Theodore Roosevelt designated the lake and surrounding area a national park.

== Geography ==
=== Regional ===
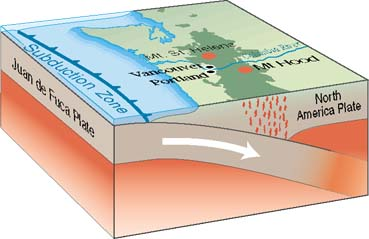
The Juan de Fuca Plate is being subducted under the North American Plate, generating gradual, diverse volcanism.

The Cascade Range was produced by convergence of the North American Plate with the subducting Juan de Fuca Plate. Active volcanism has taken place for approximately 36 million years; the nearby Challis Range features complexes as old as 55 mya. Most geologists believe that activity in the Cascades has been relatively intermittent, producing up to 3,000 volcanic calderas at a time. Frequent volcanism within the last 10,000 years created complexes from Mount Garibaldi in British Columbia to north California's Lassen Peak complex. Remarkably different from state to state, the volcanism ranges from large volcanoes to zones of many smaller geologic features such as lava shields and cinder cones. Volcanic peaks of the Cascade Mountains are grouped into two ranges, called the High Cascades and the Western Cascades; Thielsen is part of the High Cascades, which are east of the Western Cascades.

=== Local ===
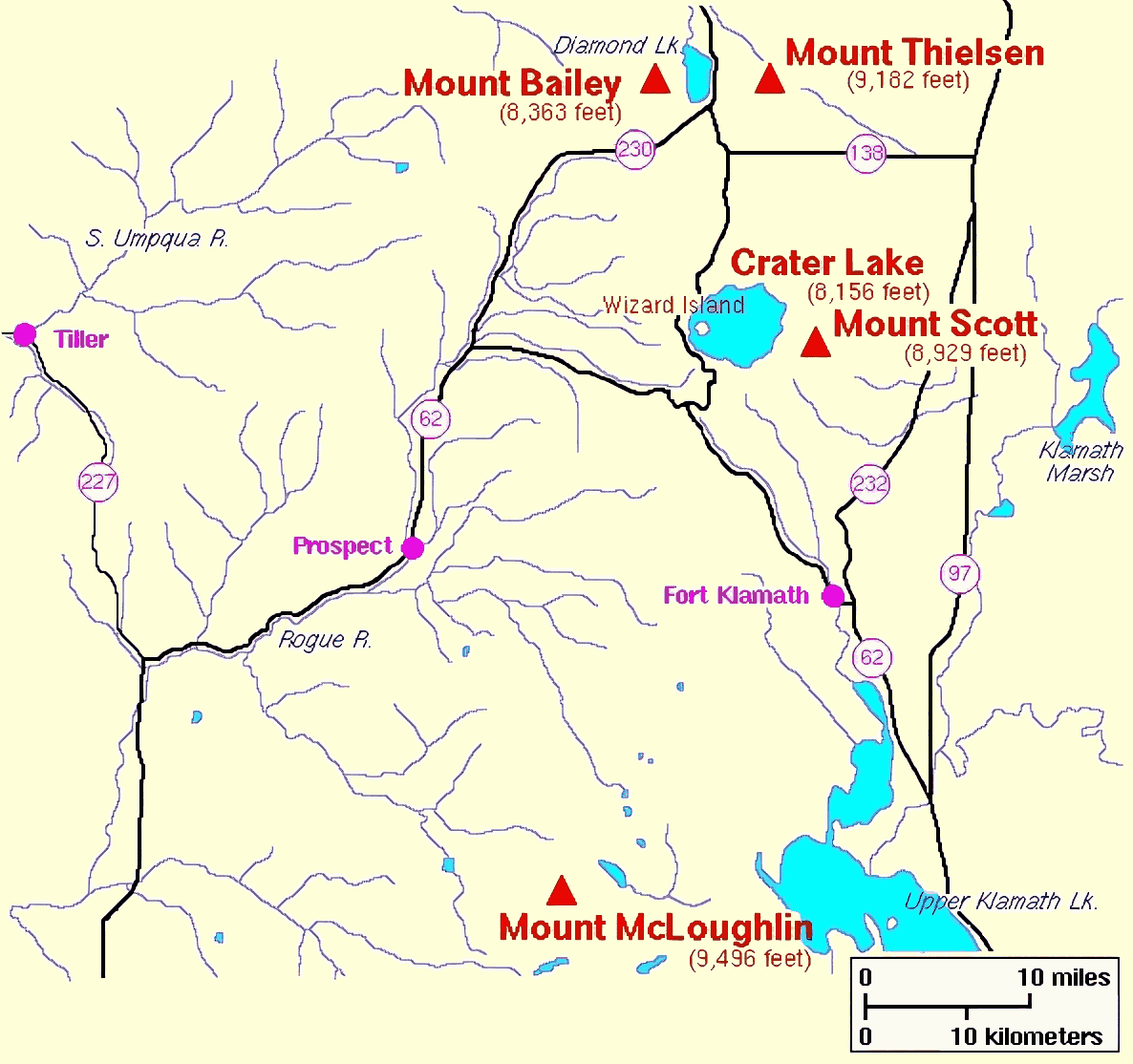
This map of the Southern Oregon Cascade Range lists several of the major volcanoes around Thielsen.

Diamond Lake, formed by one of Thielsen's eruptions, lies to the west of Mount Thielsen and beyond lies Mount Bailey, a much less eroded and younger stratovolcano. Thielsen's sharp peak is a prominent feature of the skyline visible from Crater Lake National Park. All three volcanoes are part of the Oregon High Cascades, a range that sections off the stratovolcanoes of Oregon that are younger than 3.5 million years. The High Cascades include Mount Jefferson, the Three Sisters, Broken Top, and other stratovolcanoes and remnants.

Rock in the area ages from the Upper Pliocene and Quaternary. Basalt and basaltic andesite comprise newer volcanoes atop the High Cascades: Major volcanic centers include Mount Hood, Three Sisters / Broken Top, Mount Mazama (Crater Lake), and Mount Jefferson. All have produced diverse eruptions, including both lava flows and pyroclastic eruptions, and variability in composition between dacite, basalt, and even rhyolite (except for Mount Hood, which is not known to have produced rhyolite). Thielsen is part of a series of extinct volcanoes in Oregon termed pyramidal peaks or "the Matterhorns" for their steep, spire-like summits; Thielsen is the highest at 9,182 feet (2,799 m). Other Matterhorns include Mount Washington, Three Fingered Jack, Mount Bailey, and Diamond Peak. Unlike other mountains in the High Cascades, all these volcanoes became extinct 250,000–100,000 years ago, and their summits endured the last few ice ages, accounting for their distinct shapes.

== Geology ==
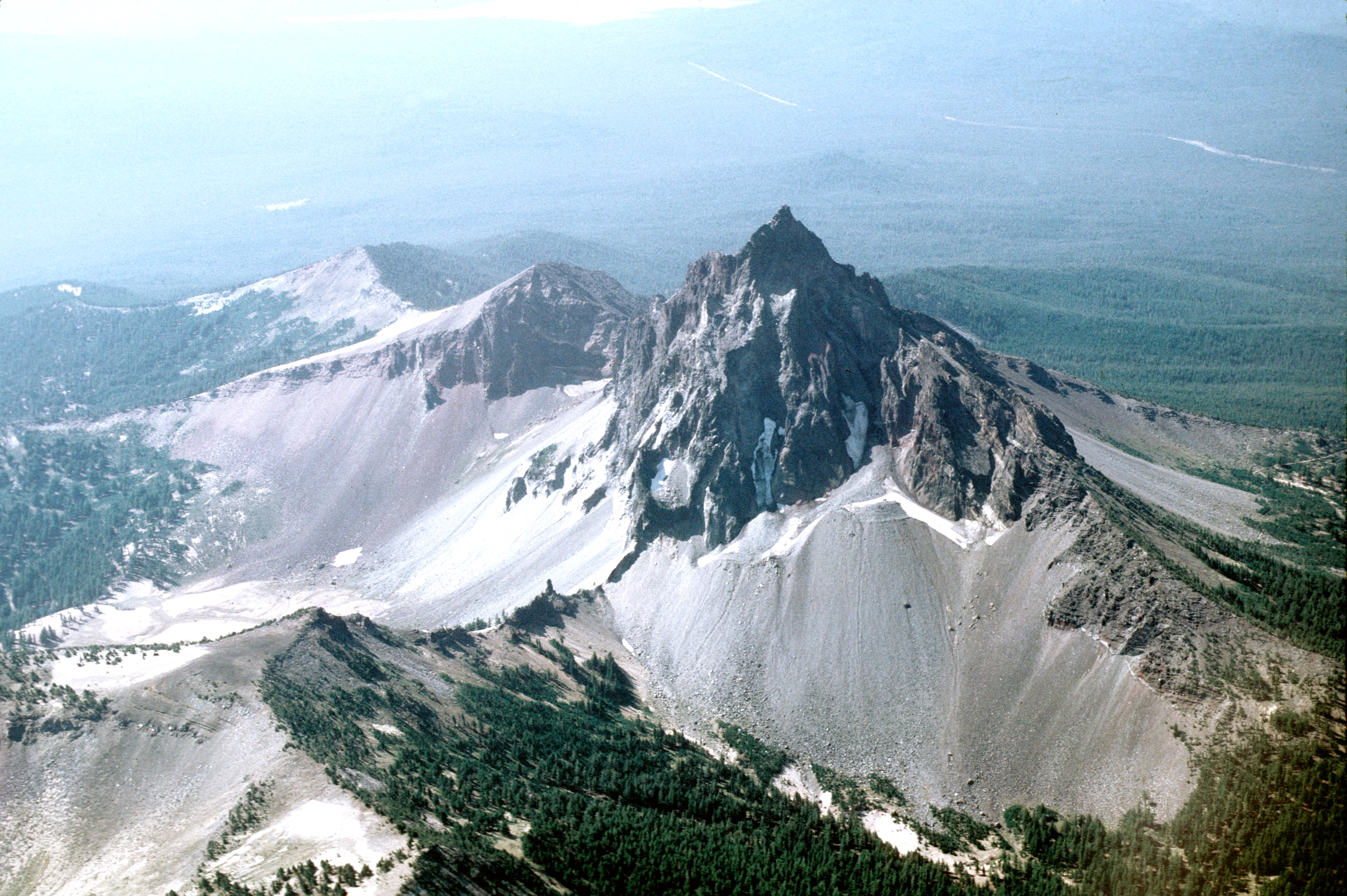
Aerial view of Mount Thielsen

Thielsen has been so deeply eroded by glaciers that there is no summit crater and the upper part of the mountain is more or less a horn. Thielsen is a relatively old Cascade volcano, and cone-building eruptions stopped relatively early. Erosion caused during the last two or three ice ages remains visible. Subsidence of the last material in Thielsen's crater moved its youngest lava more than 1,000 feet (305 m) above the active crater.

On the mountain past lava flows are diverse, some as thick as 33 feet (10 m), others as thin as 1 foot (30 cm). Stack-like figures composed of breccia and past flow deposits are as thick as 328 feet (100 m). The placement of these flows suggest that they were generated by spatter emitted by fountains in the cone. On the sides of the mountain are bands of palagonite, a clay formed from iron-rich tephra making up the body of the volcano. Basalt taken from the volcano contained pyroxene, hypersthene material, and feldspars.

Other notable formations in the vicinity include Hemlock Mountain, Windigo Butte, and Tolo Mountain. Other than Crater Lake, little water flows on the surface, but small streams have formed in canyons excavated by glaciers.

=== Composition ===
The volcanic cone of Mount Thielsen sits atop prior shield volcanoes, and has a volume of 2 cubic miles (8.3 km^{3}). The cone was built from basaltic andesite, a common component of other shield volcanoes in the Oregon Cascades, breccia, and tuff, and it is intruded by dikes. A coalesced volcanic cone, it formed as pyroclastics erupted and fountains spewed lava. Glaciers cut and deformed the cone, eroding its upper sector. This erosion opened the interior of Thielsen for observation. Within the cone, lava flows, pyroclastic flow deposits, and strata of tephra, and volcanic ash, are easily visible. Potassium-argon dating of deposits in the cone suggests that Thielsen is at least 290,000 years old. Since its eruption stopped about 250,000–100,000 years ago, the period of eruptive activity was short in time. The eruptions of the cone came in three phases: a period where lava flows built up its cone, one where more explosive pyroclastic eruptions took place, and the final period, in which pyroclastic and material of lava-based origin were erupted together forming a weak cone encircled by long deposits.

=== Glaciation ===
Glaciers were present on the volcano until the conclusion of the Little Ice Age, at the beginning of the 20th century. Pleistocene glaciers have largely eroded Thielsen's caldera, exposing its contents. The last glacier on the mountain, the small Lathrop Glacier located in the northern cirque, melted at some point after 2016. Whilst the glaciation was previously extensive, volcanic ash from eruptive activity at Mount Mazama has almost certainly masked contents.

=== Fulgurites ===
Fulgurites (substances that form when lightning melts rock) on the volcano are restricted to the very pinnacle of the mountain, and are only found between the top 5 feet (2 m) and 10 feet (3 m) of its summit. Lightning strikes the summit regularly, creating patches of "brownish black to olive-black glass" that resemble "greasy splotches of enamel paint". These range from a few centimeters in diameter to long, narrow lines up to 30 centimeters (12 in) long. Their appearance also varies: While some patches are rough and spongy, others are flat. Inspection of the fulgurite reveals a homogenous glass over a layer of basalt; in between, a stratum made of materials such as feldspar, pyroxene, and olivine exists.

== Ecology ==
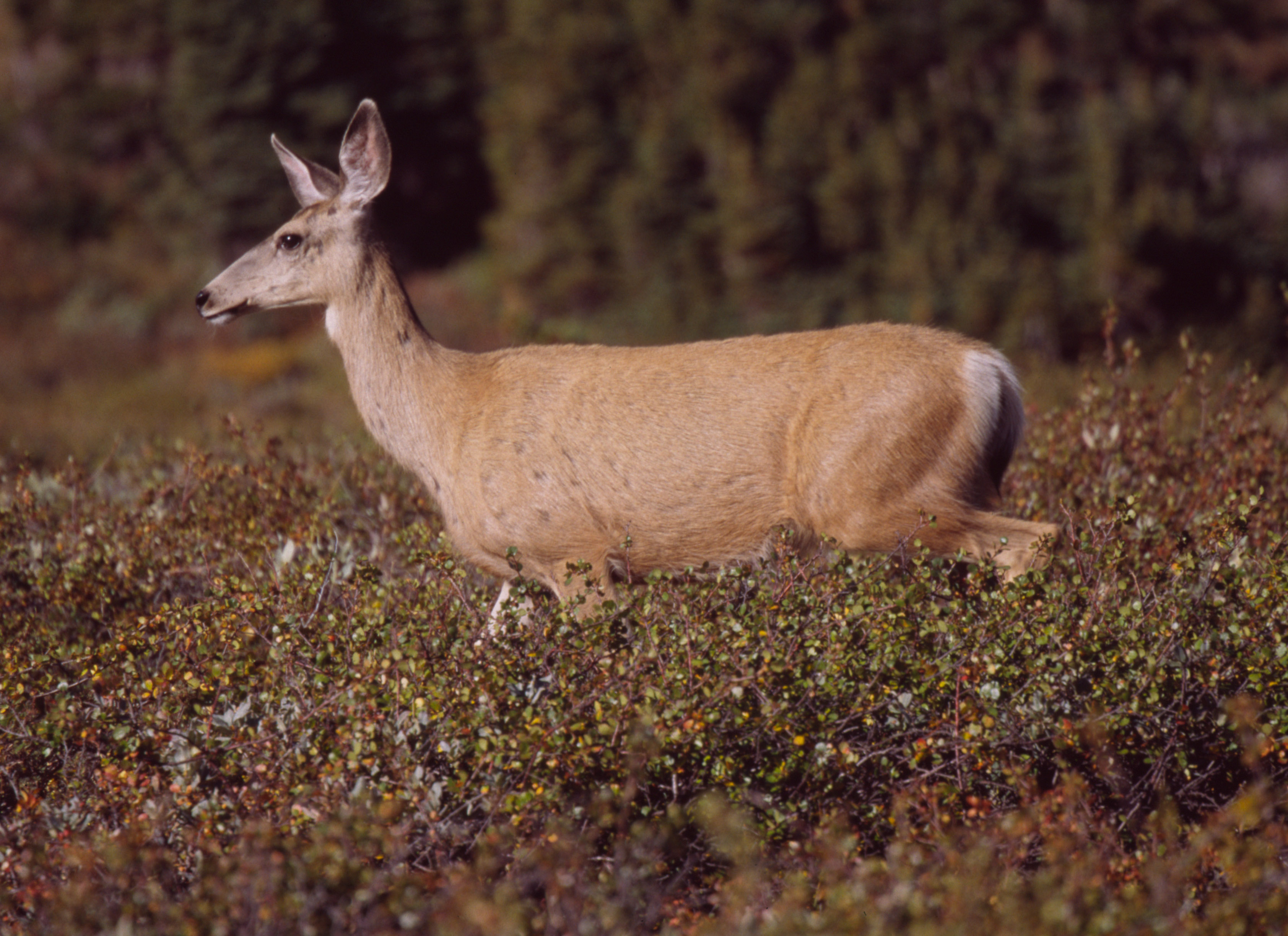
Mule deer are known to inhabit the forest around Thielsen.

A grove of enormous incense cedars exists near Diamond Lake, and there is a forest of ponderosa pine at the nearby Emile Big Tree Trail. The Umpqua National Forest features swordferns and Douglas firs. Rocky Mountain elks, pronghorns, and mule deer, bobcats, black bears, and mountain lions live in the Fremont–Winema National Forest. The forest's rivers support populations of trout, and the lakes contain fish such as the largemouth bass. The forest is inhabited by avian species such as mallards, American bald eagles, Canada geese, and whistling swans. Peregrine falcons and Warner suckers also infrequently enter its boundaries.

The lower slopes of Mount Thielsen are heavily forested, with low diversity of plant species. A forest of mountain hemlock and fir grows up to the timberline at about 7,200 feet (2,200 m). Near the peak of the volcano, whitebark pine prevails.

== Recreation ==
Mount Thielsen lies in the southern section of the Mount Thielsen Wilderness, which is part of the Deschutes, Umpqua and Fremont–Winema national forests. On the west, the wilderness borders the Oregon Cascades Recreation Area, a 157,000-square-mile (406,628 km^{2}) area set aside by Congress in 1984. The wilderness and forests offer several activities related to the mountain, such as hiking and skiing. The wilderness covers 55,100 acres (86.1 sq mi) around the volcano, featuring lakes and alpine parks. It also contains 26 miles (42 km) of the Pacific Crest National Scenic Trail, accessible from a trailhead along Oregon Highway 138. In 2009 the trail was selected as Oregon's best hike. Three skiing trails exist on the mountain, all of black diamond rating. They follow several trails through the wilderness from the bowl of the mountain.

== Bibliography ==
- Clarke, Frank Wigglesworth (1910). Analysis of rocks and minerals from the laboratory of the United States Geological survey, 1880 to 1908. United States Geological Survey.
- Diller, Joseph Silas; Patton, Horace Bushnell (1902). The Geology and Petrography of Crater Lake National Park. United States Geological Survey.
- Grubbs, Bruce (1999). Hiking Oregon's Central Cascades. Globe Pequot.
- Harris, Stephen L. (1988). Fire Mountains of the West: The Cascade and Mono Lake Volcanoes. Missoula: Mountain Press Publishing Company. ISBN 0-87842-220-X.
- Heer, F.J.; Heer, W.F. (1914). "Hunter-Trader-Trapper". 28.
- Mohlenbrock, Robert H. (2006). This Land: A guide to western national forests. University of California Press.
- "Mount Thielsen". Geographic Names Information System. United States Geological Survey, United States Department of the Interior.
- "Thielsen". Global Volcanism Program. Smithsonian Institution.
