= Walto =

Walto may refer to:

- Waldo of Reichenau (740–814), sometimes spelled Walto, Carolingian abbot and bishop
- Walto Tuomioja (1888–1931), Finnish lawyer, journalist and politician
- Walto Tribe, a subclan of the Tyari Assyrian tribe
- Ceylanlı, Hakkâri (Kurdish: Walto), Turkey, a village
- Dokor Walto, a character in Isaac Asimov's novel Foundation

== See also ==
- Stanisław Waltoś (born 1932), Polish legal scholar and academic
- Waldo (disambiguation)
