= Waldo Mountain Fire Lookout =

Fire lookout on Waldo Mountain, Oregon, U.S.

Coordinates: 43.7653°N 122.0990°W

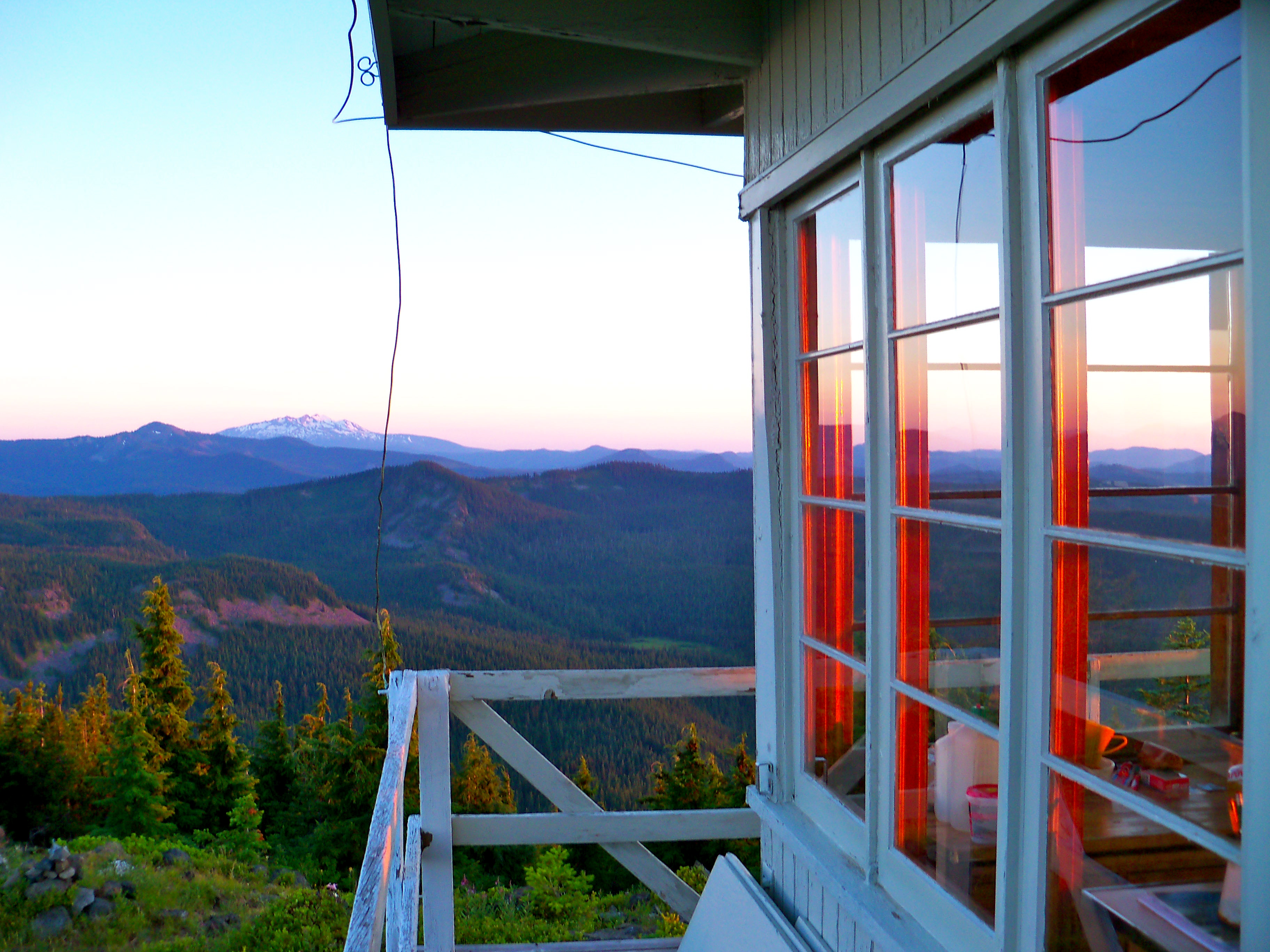
Waldo Mountain fire lookout tower, Willamette National Forest

The Waldo Mountain fire lookout is located atop Waldo Mountain, in the Willamette National Forest, Oregon.

The original fire lookout tower was built on this site in 1926 and was a small cabin. In 1929 a cupola style lookout replaced the cabin. The current flat top lookout was built in 1956. The lookout is currently unstaffed and no longer a functioning lookout.

This is hike #90 in William Sullivan's 100 Hikes in the Central Oregon Cascades. Sullivan describes the hike as a difficult 7.9 miles (12.7 km) loop with a 2,000' elevation gain.

== See also ==
- Firefighting in Oregon
