= Waltheof =

Waltheof, Waldeve or Waldef is a masculine name of Old English origin and it survives in present-day as the name Waldo. Its original meaning is uncertain. It may refer to:

- Waltheof of Bamburgh (died after 1006), Waltheof I, Earl of Northumberland 963–995
- Waltheof II, Earl of Northumbria (died 1076), 11th-century Earl of Northumberland
- Waltheof of Melrose (died 1159), Anglo-Saxon abbot and saint
- Waltheof, Earl of Dunbar (died 1182), 13th-century Earl of Dunbar
- Waltheof of Allerdale, 11th- and 12th-century Anglo-Saxon lord of Allerdale
- Sheffield Park Academy, previously Waltheof School, Sheffield

== See also ==
- Waldo (disambiguation)
