= Lathrop Glacier =

Glacier in the United States

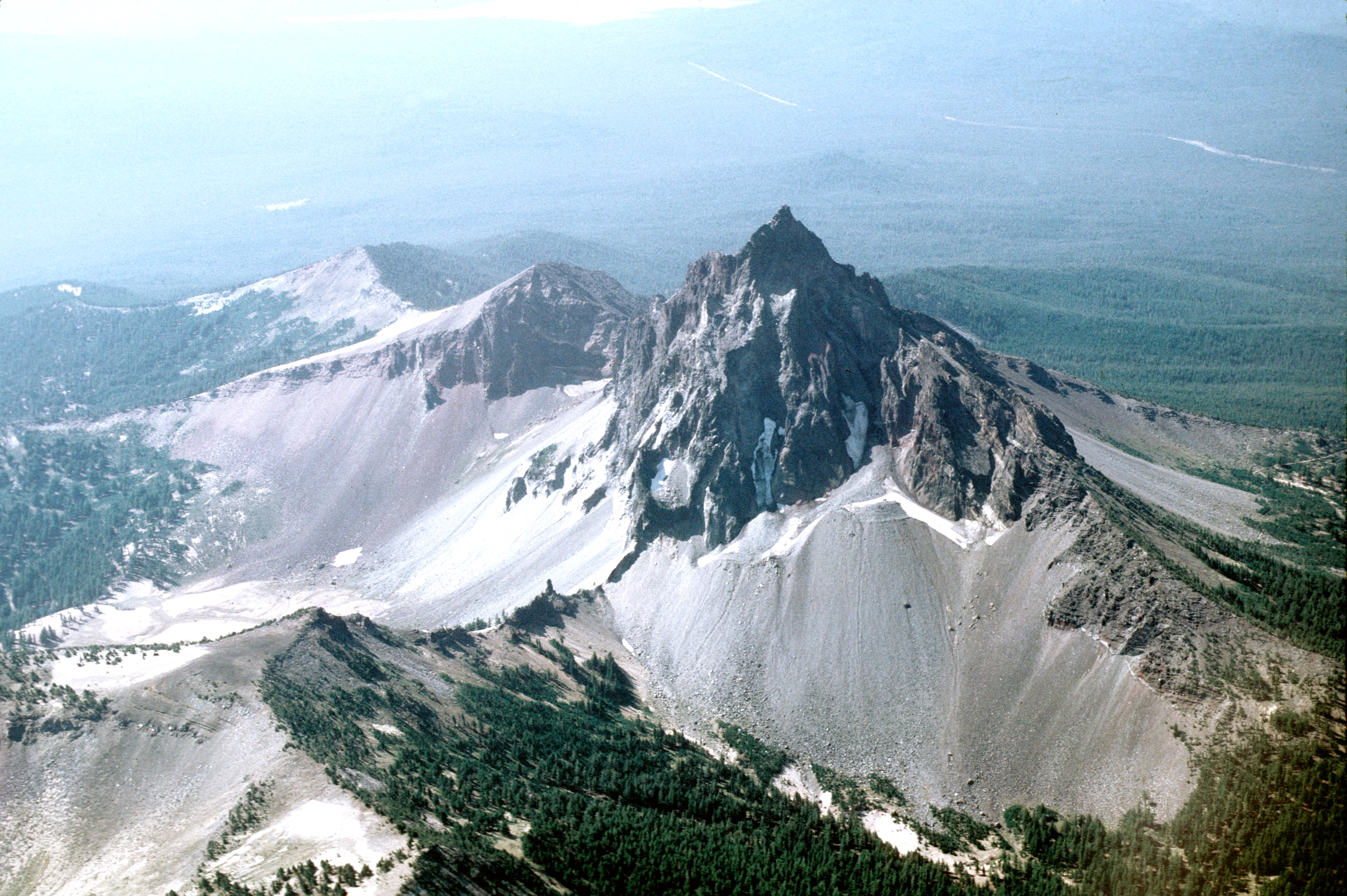
- Lathrop Glacier is the small ice patch at center-right and below the summit of Mount Thielsen

- Location within Oregon
- Type: Mountain glacier
- Location: Cascade Range, Douglas County, Oregon, U.S.
- Coordinates: 43°09′15″N 122°04′02″W
- Terminus: Talus
- Status: Retreating

Lathrop Glacier was in the U.S. state of Oregon. The glacier was situated in the Cascade Range at an elevation generally above 8,500 feet (2,600 m) on the steep northeast slope of Mount Thielsen, an extinct shield volcano. Lathrop Glacier consisted of two small bodies of ice, first discovered in 1966, and was the southernmost glacier in the state of Oregon.

In August 2020, the Oregon Glaciers Institute reported that the glacier had disappeared.

== See also ==
- List of glaciers in the United States
