= Waldo Mountain =

Mountain in Oregon, United States

- Location within Oregon

Highest point
- Elevation: 6,361 ft (1,939 m) NAVD 88
- Prominence: 997 ft (304 m)
- Coordinates: 43°45′55″N 122°05′56″W

Geography
- Location: Lane County, Oregon. U.S.
- Parent range: Cascade Range
- Topo map: USGS Waldo Mountain

Geology
- Mountain type: Shield volcano
- Last eruption: Pleistocene or earlier

Climbing
- Easiest route: Hike

Waldo Mountain is a summit in Lane County, Oregon, in the United States. with an elevation of 6,361 feet (1,939 m). It is in the Waldo Lake Wilderness and the Willamette National Forest.

The mountain and nearby Waldo Lake were named for John B. Waldo, an Oregon jurist. The Waldo Mountain Fire Lookout stands at the summit.

== Geology ==
Along with Cupit Mary Mountain, Waldo Mountain is a forested, extinct shield volcano. It is part of the Diamond Peak (Oregon) chain.
