= Diamond Peak Wilderness =

Wilderness area in Oregon, United States

- IUCN category Ib (wilderness area)
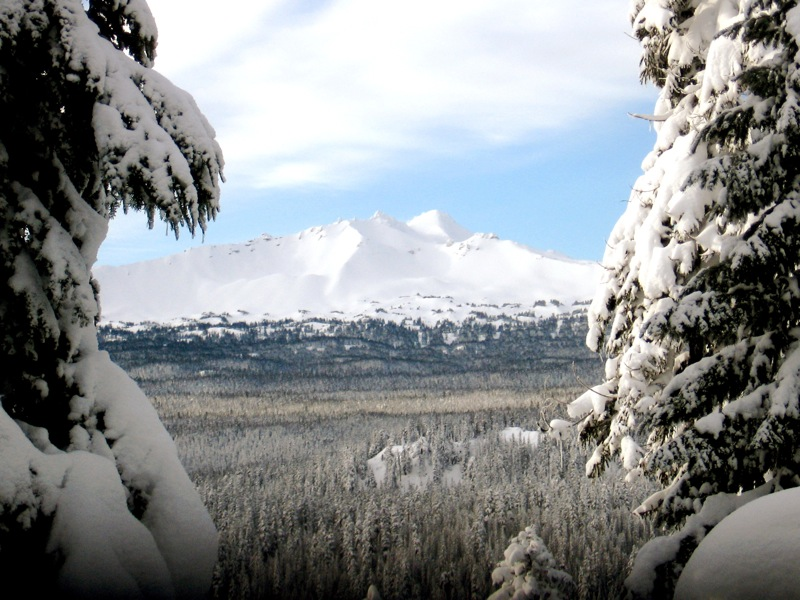
- Diamond Peak from the Pacific Crest Trail

- Location within the United States
- Location: Klamath / Lane counties, Oregon, United States
- Nearest city: Oakridge, Oregon
- Coordinates: 43°31′0″N 122°9′0″W
- Area: 52,337 acres (21,180 ha)
- Established: 1964
- Governing body: U.S. Forest Service

The Diamond Peak Wilderness in the U.S. state of Oregon is a wilderness area straddling the Cascade crest and includes the Diamond Peak volcano. It is located within two National Forests - the Willamette National Forest on the west and the Deschutes National Forest on the east.

== Designation ==
On February 5, 1957, the Forest Service established the 36,637-acre (14,826 ha) Diamond Peak Wild Area. Upon passage of the federal Wilderness Act in 1964 it was reclassified as wilderness. With the passage of the Oregon Wilderness Act of 1984, Diamond Peak Wilderness increased in size to its present 52,337 acres (21,180 ha).

== Geography ==
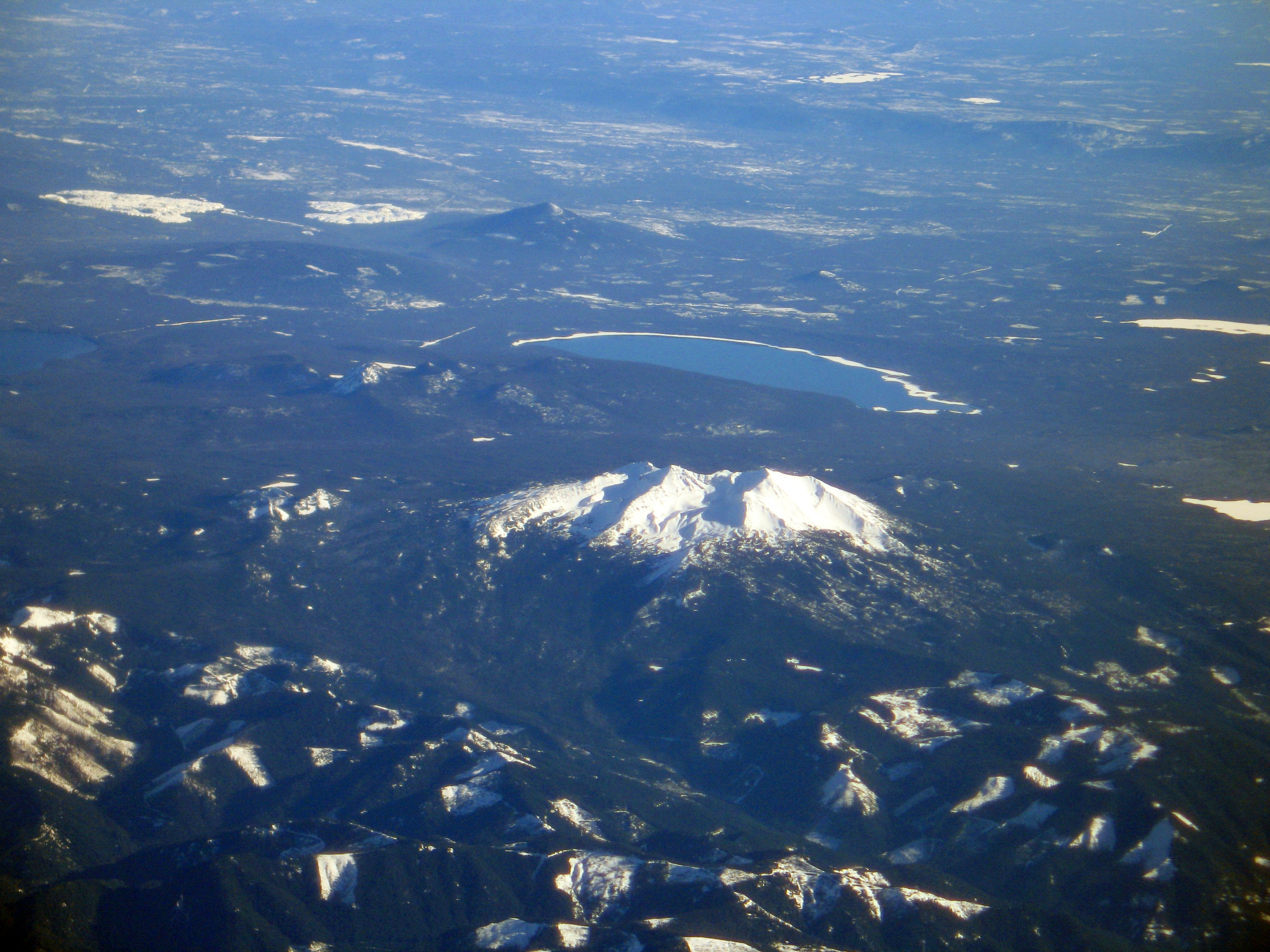
Diamond Peak and Crescent Lake from the west.

At 8,744 feet (2,665 m), Diamond Peak is the highest peak in the wilderness. The next highest named peaks are Mount Yoran at 7,100 feet (2,200 m) and Lakeview Mountain at 7,065 feet (2,153 m). Diamond Peak is a shield volcano formed as the entire Cascade Range was undergoing volcanic activity and uplift. Glaciers carved the large volcanic peak, and when they receded, the bulk of the mountain remained, with snowfields near the summit and dozens of small lakes surrounding the peak. These lakes range from one to 28 acres (11 ha) in size. Approximately 14 miles (23 km) of the Pacific Crest National Scenic Trail pass through this wilderness. Another 38 miles (61 km) of trail, including the 10-mile (16 km) Diamond Peak Trail, stretches the length of the west side of the peak.

== Vegetation ==
Nearly the entire Diamond Peak Wilderness is covered with mixed stands of mountain hemlock, lodgepole and western white pine, and silver, noble and other true firs. Alpine flowers, including varieties of mimulus, trillium, lupine, penstemon, heather, and Indian paintbrush, are common along trails, lake shores, streams and in the meadows. Huckleberry and dwarf manzanita are common in the dense underbrush.

== Wildlife ==
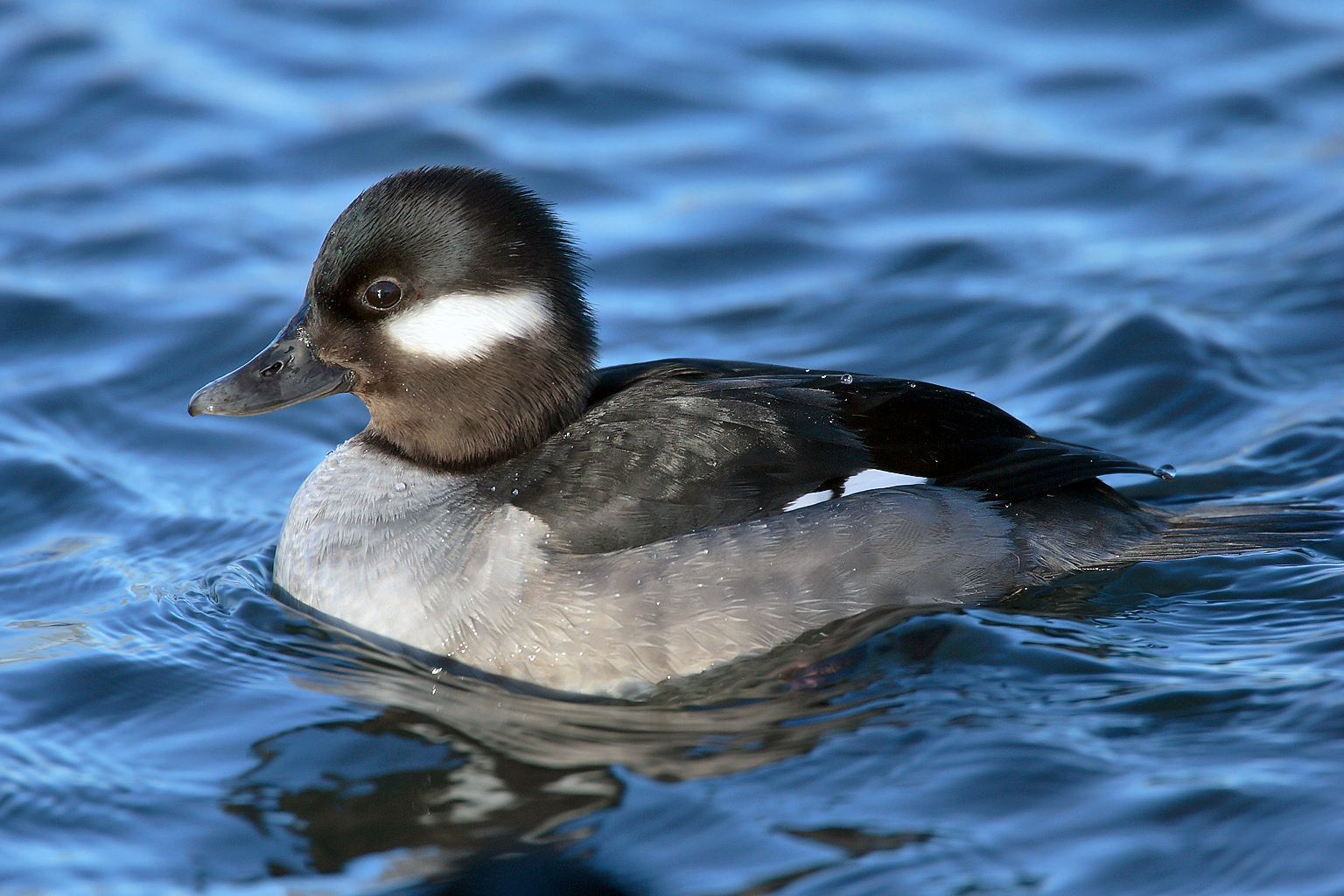
Bufflehead (Bucephala albeola)

The Diamond Peak Wilderness is home to black-tailed deer, mule deer, and elk. In winter, the mule deer migrate eastward out of the wilderness to the sage desert, while black-tailed deer and elk drop down the west slope. Black bear and small mammals including marmots, snowshoe rabbits, squirrels, pine martens, foxes, and pikas inhabit the area all year long. The raven, Clark's nutcracker, Oregon jay, and water ouzel frequent the forest and streams year-round. Bufflehead and goldeneye ducks occasionally nest near the lakes.

== Recreation ==
Recreational activities in the Diamond Peak Wilderness include hiking, horseback riding, camping, hunting, fishing, and mountain climbing. Some 52 miles (84 km) of trails cross the wilderness, including 14 miles (23 km) the Pacific Crest Trail along the east slope of Diamond Peak. Marie Lake, Divide Lake, and Rockpile Lake are popular base camps for the climb up Diamond Peak. Mount Yoran and Lakeview Mountain can also be climbed. Winter is popular for snowshoeing and cross-country skiing.

== See also ==
- List of Oregon Wildernesses
- List of U.S. Wilderness Areas
