= Waldo (surname) =

Waldo is the surname of:

== People ==
- Charles Waldo (1819–1909), American politician in Wisconsin
- Clarence Abiathar Waldo (1852–1926), American mathematician, author, and educator
- Daniel Waldo (1762–1864), veteran of the American Revolutionary War, missionary and U.S. House clergyman
- Daniel Waldo (Oregon pioneer) (1800–1880), American legislator in the Provisional Government of Oregon
- Dr. Dwight B. Waldo (1864–1939), first president of Western Michigan University
- Dwight Waldo (1913–2000), American political scientist
- Edward Hamilton Waldo, birth name of American science fiction author Theodore Sturgeon (1918–1985)
- Elisabeth Waldo (1918–2026), American violinist, composer and ethnomusicologist
- George E. Waldo (1851–1842), American politician
- Janet Waldo (1920–2016), American actress and voice artist
- Jim Waldo, computer scientist and software architect
- John B. Waldo (1844–1907), jurist and conservationist in Oregon, United States
- Katita Waldo (born 1968), Spanish ballet dancer and ballet master
- Octavia Waldo (born 1929), American writer
- Peter Waldo (1140–1218), founder of a Christian sect called the Waldensians
- Rhinelander Waldo (1877–1927), US Army captain, Fire and later Police Commissioner of New York City
- Samuel Waldo (1696–1759), Massachusetts land speculator, soldier and political figure
- Samuel Lovett Waldo (1783–1861), American painter
- William Waldo (California politician) (1812–1881)
- William Waldo (Oregon politician) (1832–1911)

== Fictional characters ==
- Mr Waldo, a main character in Under Milk Wood, a Dylan Thomas play
