= Mount Bailey (Oregon) =

Inactive volcano in Oregon, United States

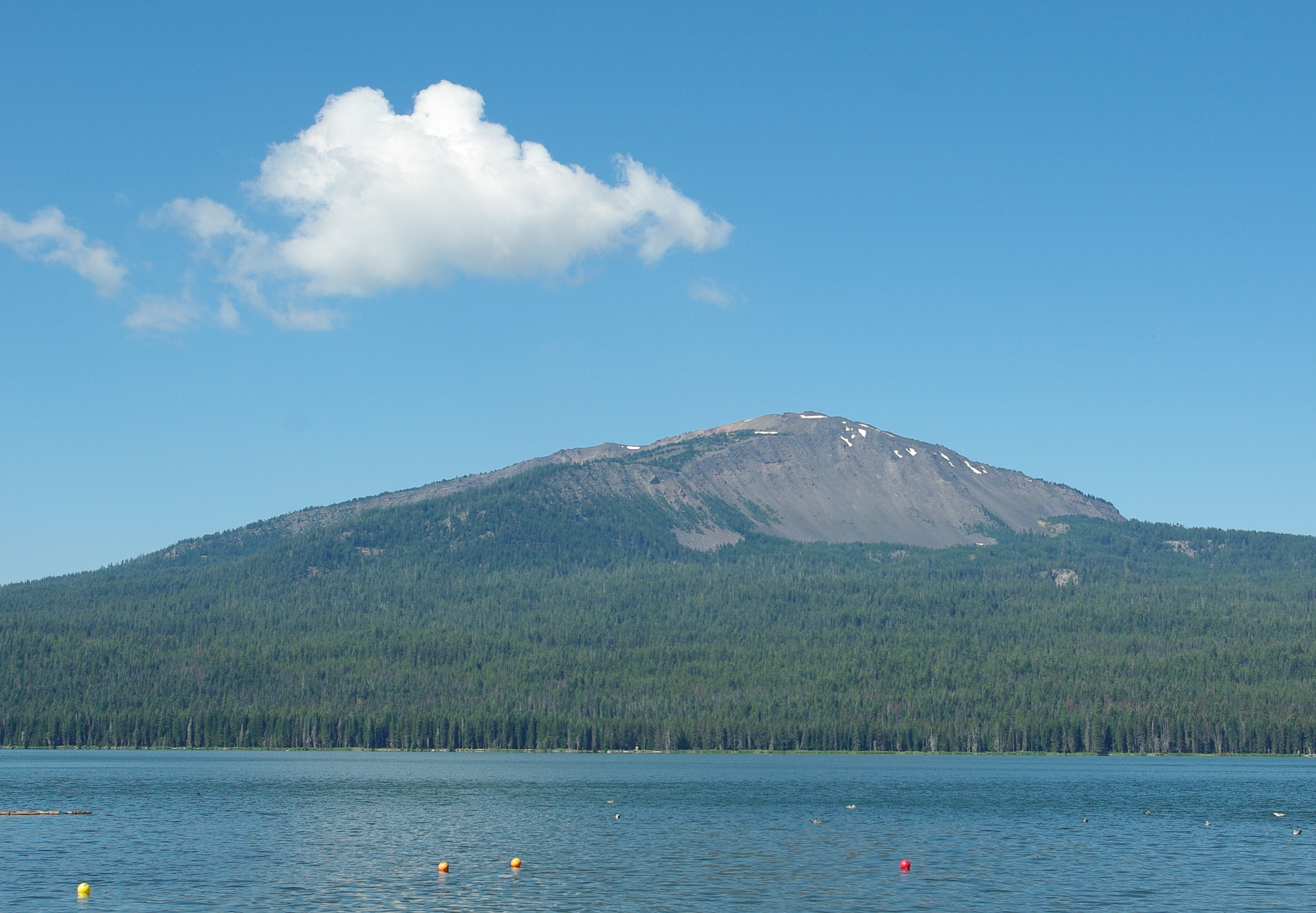
- Mount Bailey from Diamond Lake

Highest point
- Elevation: 8,375 ft (2,553 m) NAVD 88
- Prominence: 2,968 ft (905 m)
- Coordinates: 43°09′19″N 122°13′12″W

Geography
- Location within Oregon
- Location: Douglas County, Oregon, U.S.
- Parent range: Cascade Range
- Topo map: USGS Diamond Lake

Geology
- Formed by: Subduction zone volcanism
- Mountain type(s): Shield volcano, tephra cone
- Volcanic arc: Cascade Volcanic Arc
- Last eruption: Less than 100,000 years ago

Climbing
- Easiest route: Trail hike

Mount Bailey is a relatively young tephra cone and shield volcano in the Cascade Range, located on the opposite side of Diamond Lake from Mount Thielsen in southern Oregon, United States. Bailey consists of a 2,000-foot (610 m)-high main cone on top of an old basaltic andesite shield volcano. With a volume of 8 to 9 km^{3} (1.9 to 2.2 cu mi), Mount Bailey is slightly smaller than neighboring Diamond Peak. Mount Bailey is a popular destination for recreational activities. Well known in the Pacific Northwest region as a haven for skiing in the winter months, the mountain's transportation, instead of a conventional chairlift, is provided by snowcats—treaded, tractor-like vehicles that can ascend Bailey's steep, snow-covered slopes and carry skiers to the higher reaches of the mountain. In the summer months, a 5-mile (8 km) hiking trail gives foot access to Bailey's summit. Mount Bailey is one of Oregon's Matterhorns.

Native Americans are credited with the first ascents of Bailey. Spiritual leaders held feasts and prayer vigils on the summit.

== Etymology ==
The origin of the mountain's name is a matter of dispute. Older maps show its name as either "Old Baldy" or "Old Bailey", "Bailey" possibly being a drafting error. The summit's bald, burnt-over appearance might indicate the origin of the designation "Baldy". No record of a person named Bailey who was connected with the peak has been found. In 1992, the Oregon Geographic Names Board voted to name the mountain in honor of naturalists Vernon and Florence Bailey. According to William G. Steel, the Klamath name for the mountain was Youxlokes, which means "Medicine Mountain". According to Klamath tradition, their medicine men and priests would feast on the mountain's summit and commune with the upper world.

== Geography and geology ==
Mount Bailey is part of the High Cascades in the western United States. The High Cascades have long been glaciated, by both Pacific-bred storms and natural, elevation-caused, glaciation. In fact, glaciation probably formed on them as early as the late Miocene. Over time, as the range built up, newer activity diminished older Tertiary age rock. Creating lava plateaus, Pliocene activity, mostly basaltic and andesitic, was probably responsible for the original cones at Bailey, Thielsen, and Union Peak.

Mount Bailey heads the Mount Bailey chain, which consists of the mountain and smaller cinder cones trending north. Similarly to its neighbor Mount Thielsen, it is a shield volcano with precipitous summit slopes. Built around the same time as Rodley Butte, according to morphological study, the current volcano is no more than 100,000 years old, and formed relatively close to Diamond Peak's current cone. Despite its similarity to Rodley Butte, both in age and original composition, Bailey switched from erupting basaltic andesite to andesite.

Bailey is comprised by a central tephra cone, upon which basaltic andesite eruptions streamed over, building up to create the current volcano. Eventually switching to andesite, it may have been built over several eruptions or even eruptive periods, judging from the silicic nature of its rock. It is currently inactive, having been since approximately the time Mount Mazama became active, sometime in the early Pleistocene epoch.

== Ecology and recreation ==
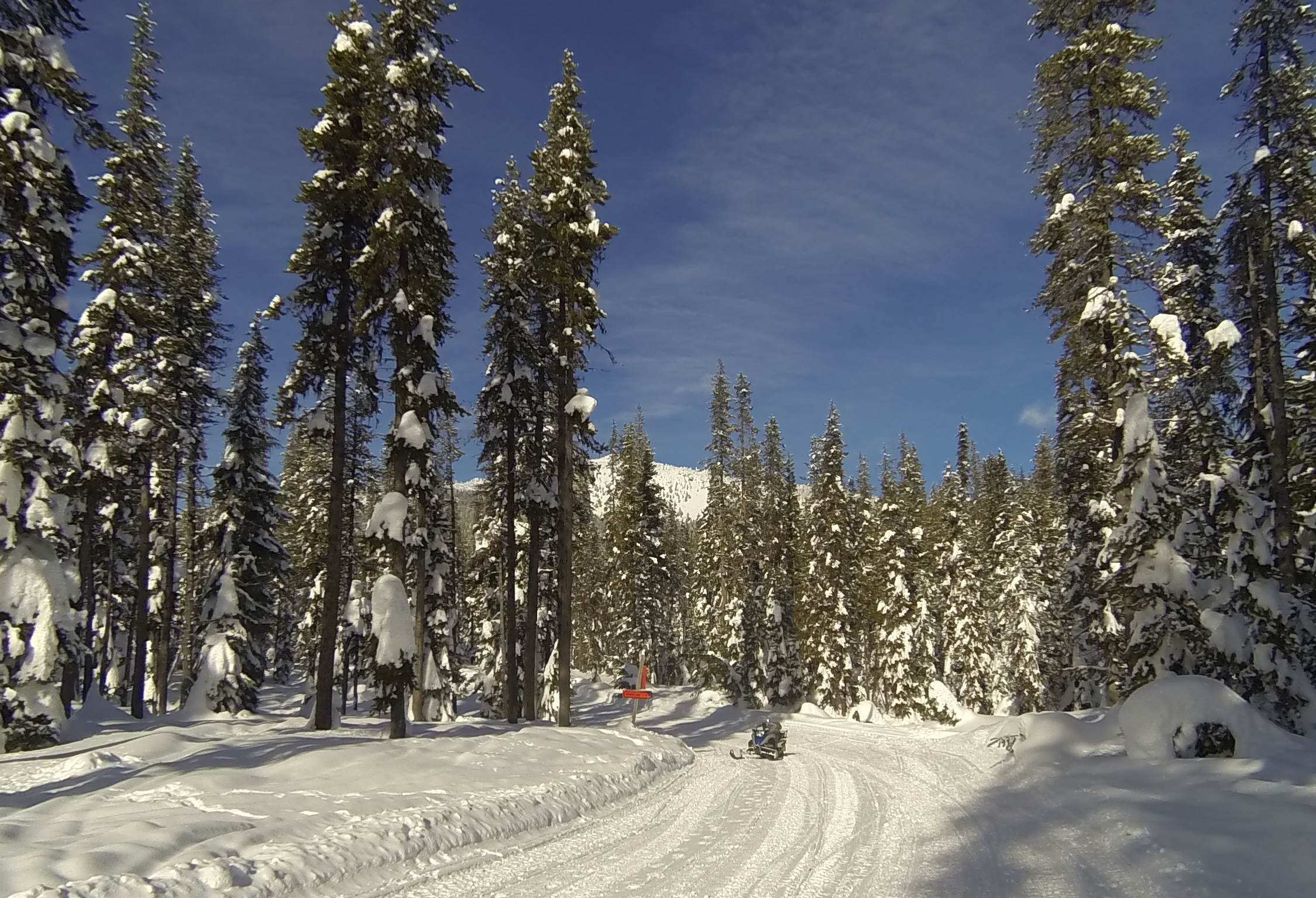
A snowmobile trail between Mount Bailey and Diamond Lake; Mount Bailey is showing through the trees in the background.

Diverse flora exists on Mount Bailey. Starting at the lower slopes, the prominent tree type is standard pine, eventually changing to a landscape of mountain hemlock, western white pine, and Shasta fir.

Bailey is a popular hiking and skiing site, due to its steep climbs and views of Diamond Lake. It is accessible from Oregon Route 230, starting at the Fox Spring trailhead. Following the Mount Bailey Trail, part of the Diamond Lake Recreational Area, hikers can see "panoramas to the northeast of Diamond Lake and Bailey's dizzying avalanche bowl". To skiers, the peak is known for its method of transportation, featuring snowcats.

== See also ==
- Map of the Southern Oregon Cascade Range

== Bibliography ==
- Bernstein, Art (2001). Hiking Oregon's southern Cascades and Siskiyous. Globe Pequot. ISBN 978-1-56044-898-3.
- Dunegan, Lizann (2004). Hiking Oregon: A Guide to Oregon's Greatest Hiking Adventures. Globe Pequot. ISBN 978-0-7627-2606-6.
- Harris, Ann G.; Tuttle, Esther; Tuttle, Sherwood D. (2004). Geology of national parks. Kendall Hunt. ISBN 978-0-7872-9970-5.
- McArthur, Lewis A.; McArthur, Lewis L. (2003) [1928]. Oregon Geographic Names (7th ed.). Portland, Oregon: Oregon Historical Society Press. ISBN 978-0875952772.
- Wood, Charles A.; Kienle, Jűrgen (1993). Volcanoes of North America. Cambridge University Press. ISBN 0-521-43811-X.
