= Waldo (given name) =

Waldo is a masculine given name. It derives from the Anglo-Saxon name Waltheof. It may refer to:

== People ==
- Waldo of Reichenau (740–814), Carolingian abbot and bishop
- Waldo Colburn (1824–1885), American politician
- Waldo Díaz-Balart (1931–2025), Cuban-born painter and sculptor
- Ralph Waldo Emerson (1803–1882) American writer and philosopher
- Waldo A. Evans (1869–1936), American naval captain and military governor
- Waldo Frank (1889–1967), American novelist, historian, and critic
- Waldo Grant (1946–2023), American serial killer
- Waldo E. Harder (1918–1976), president of Grace University
- M. Waldo Hatler (1894–1967), American soldier and Medal of Honor recipient
- Waldo Hutchins (1822–1891), U.S. Congressman
- Waldo P. Johnson (1817–1885), U.S. senator and Confederate congressman
- Waldo Kantor (born 1960), Argentine volleyball player
- Waldo K. Lyon (1914–1998), U.S. Navy physicist
- Waldo Machado (1934–2019), Brazilian former footballer
- Waldo McBurney (1902–2009), credited as "America's Oldest Worker"
- Waldo Nelson (1898-1997), American pediatrician
- Waldo Ponce, Chilean football player
- Waldo de los Ríos (1934–1977), Argentine composer and conductor
- Waldo Salt (1914–1987), American screenwriter
- Waldo E. Sexton (1885–1967), American businessman
- Waldo R. Tobler (1930–2018), American-Swiss geographer
- Waldo Williams (1904–1971), Welsh language poet

== Fictional characters ==
- Waldo, the main character in the Where's Waldo? children's book franchise
- Waldo Faldo, a character from the television series Family Matters
