= Waldo Water Tower =

Waldo Water Tower may refer to:

- Waldo Water Tower (Waldo, Arkansas), listed on the National Register of Historic Places in Columbia County, Arkansas
- Waldo Water Tower (Kansas City, Missouri), listed on the National Register of Historic Places in Jackson County, Missouri
