= Waldo, Magoffin County, Kentucky =

Unincorporated community in Kentucky, United States

Waldo, Kentucky
- Unincorporated community
- Location within Kentucky Location within the United States
- Coordinates: 37°34′33″N 82°58′40″W
- Country: United States
- State: Kentucky
- County: Magoffin
- Elevation: 981 ft (299 m)
- Time zone: UTC-5 (Eastern (EST))
  - Summer (DST): UTC-4 (EDT)
- ZIP codes: 41664
- GNIS feature ID: 507703

Waldo is an unincorporated community within Magoffin County, Kentucky, United States.
