= Diamond Peak (Oregon) =

Mountain in the United States

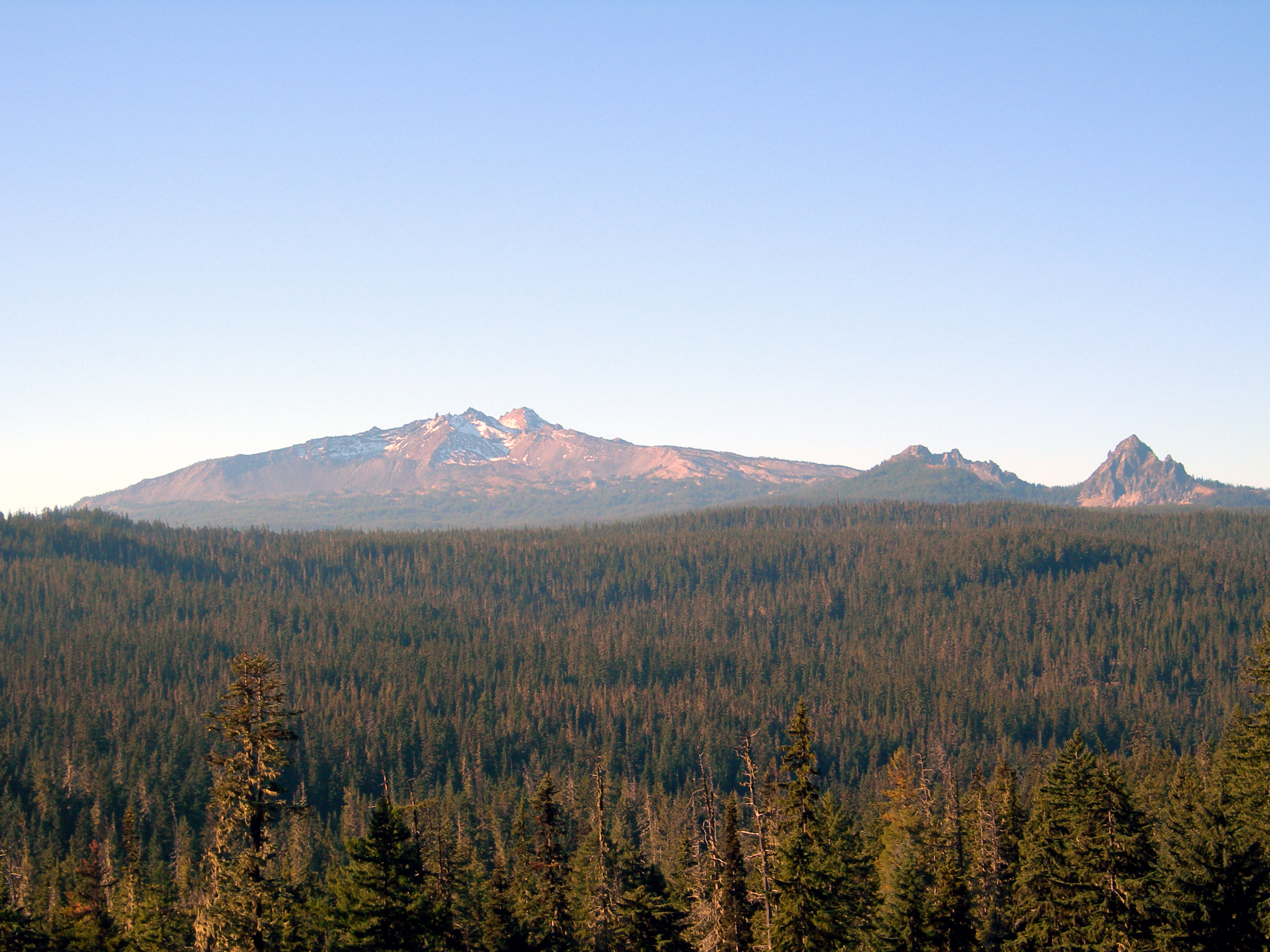
- Diamond Peak volcano in October 2005, with the smaller Mount Yoran to the right

Highest point
- Elevation: 8,748 ft (2,666 m) NAVD 88
- Prominence: 3,104 ft (946 m)
- Coordinates: 43°31′15″N 122°08′58″W

Geography
- Location within Oregon
- Location: Klamath and Lane counties, Oregon, U.S.
- Parent range: Cascades
- Topo map: USGS Diamond Peak

Geology
- Formed by: Subduction zone volcanism
- Rock age: Less than 100,000 years
- Mountain type(s): Shield volcano with a stratocone, stratovolcano
- Volcanic arc: Cascade Volcanic Arc
- Last eruption: More than ~11,000 years ago, but less than 100,000 years ago

Climbing
- First ascent: 1852, John Diamond and William Macy
- Easiest route: Hike or climb

Diamond Peak is a volcano in Klamath and Lane counties of central Oregon in the United States. It is a shield volcano, though it might also be considered a modest stratocone. Diamond Peak forms part of the Cascade Volcanic Arc, a segment of the Cascade Range in western North America extending from southern British Columbia through Oregon to Northern California. Reaching an elevation of 8,748 feet (2,666 m), the mountain is located near Willamette Pass in the Diamond Peak Wilderness within the Deschutes and Willamette national forests. Surrounded by coniferous forest and visible in the skyline from foothills near Eugene, Diamond Peak offers a few climbing routes and can be scrambled. Diamond Peak is one of Oregon's Matterhorns.

The volcano, consisting mostly of basaltic andesite, has relatively steep slopes and an andesitic volcanic cone that contains pyroclastic materials at its core. The mountain has a number of subfeatures including Mount Yoran, Lakeview Mountain, and a number of cinder cones. Diamond Peak was thoroughly eroded by glaciers and has several cirques as a result.

== Geography ==
Located 20 miles (32 km) north of Mount Bailey and Diamond Lake in the U.S. state of Oregon, the Diamond Peak volcano represents the predominant feature of the Willamette Pass locality on the border of Klamath and Lane counties, reaching an elevation of 8,748 feet (2,666 m), and can be seen from many summits in western Oregon.

=== Wilderness ===
The Diamond Peak Wilderness, located 62 miles (100 km) southeast of Eugene and 64 miles (103 km) southwest of Bend, encompasses an area of 52,611 acres (212.91 km^{2}).^{[a]} Jointly administered by the Willamette National Forest on the west and the Deschutes National Forest on the east, it incorporates 14 miles (23 km) of the Pacific Crest Trail and 38 miles (61 km) of additional trails. The forested landscape below Diamond Peak features several lakes and creeks. As the wilderness area ranges in elevation from 4,790 to 8,748 feet (1,460 to 2,666 m), Diamond Peak is the highest and most predominant peak, though three other mountains within the wilderness reach elevations greater than 7,000 feet (2,100 m): Mount Yoran, an unnamed 7,138-foot peak near Mount Yoran, and Lakeview Mountain. The wilderness area is largely inaccessible by road in the winter season, though its northern side can be reached from Gold Lake Sno-Park on Oregon Route 58.

== Geology ==
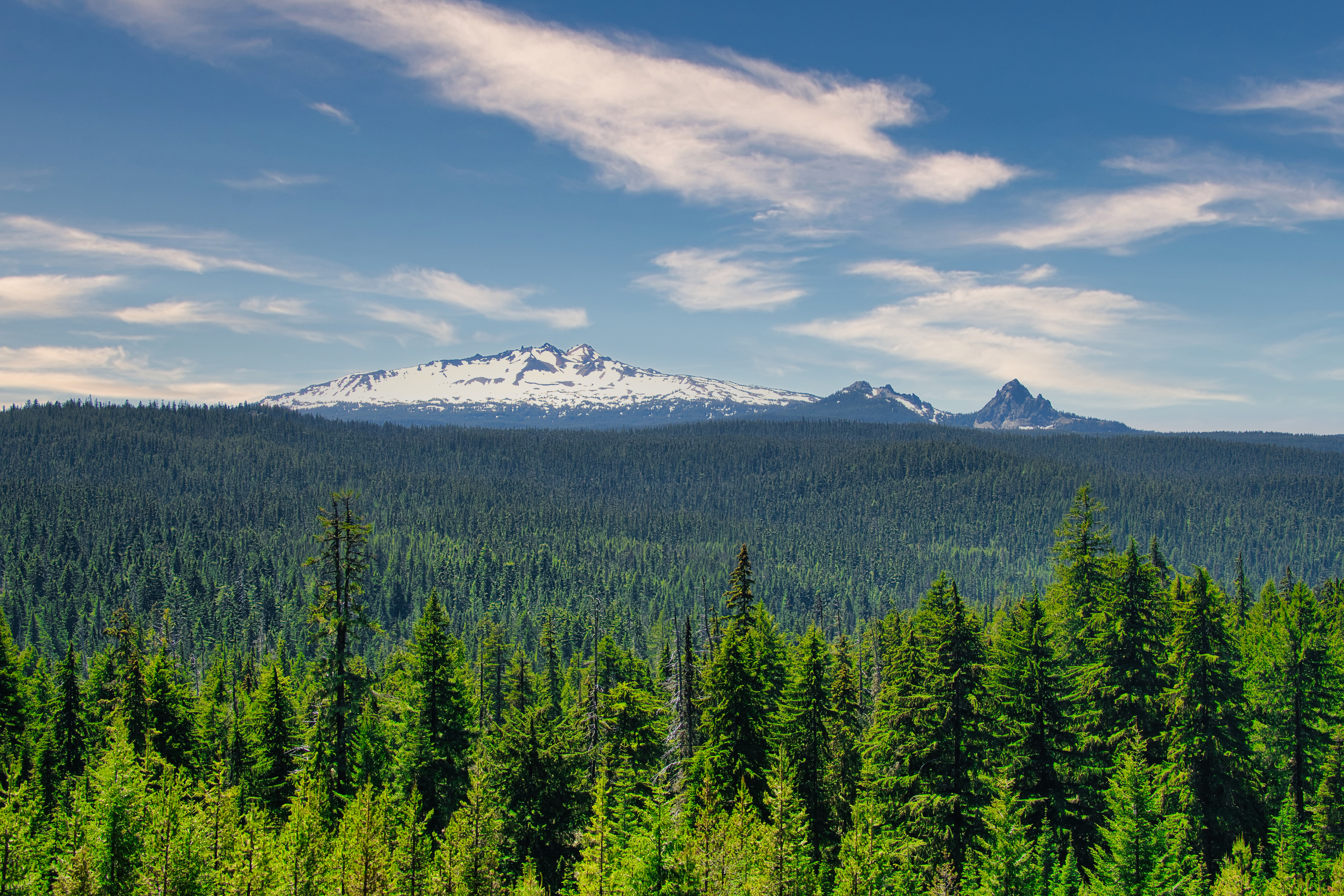
Diamond Peak as seen from Oregon 58 (June 2023)

Diamond Peak forms part of the central arc of the Cascade Volcanoes, and it joins several other volcanoes in the eastern segment of the Cascade Range known as the High Cascades. Formed towards the end of the Pleistocene epoch, these mountains are underlain by more ancient volcanoes that subsided due to parallel north–south faulting in the surrounding region. The High Cascades consist mostly of Pleistocene volcanoes constructed on top of upper Cenozoic lava flows and volcanic vents (produced within the last 15 million years), with compositions varying from homogenous, mafic lava flows (rich in magnesium and iron) and pyroclastic rocks to lava more enriched with basalt and rhyodacite.

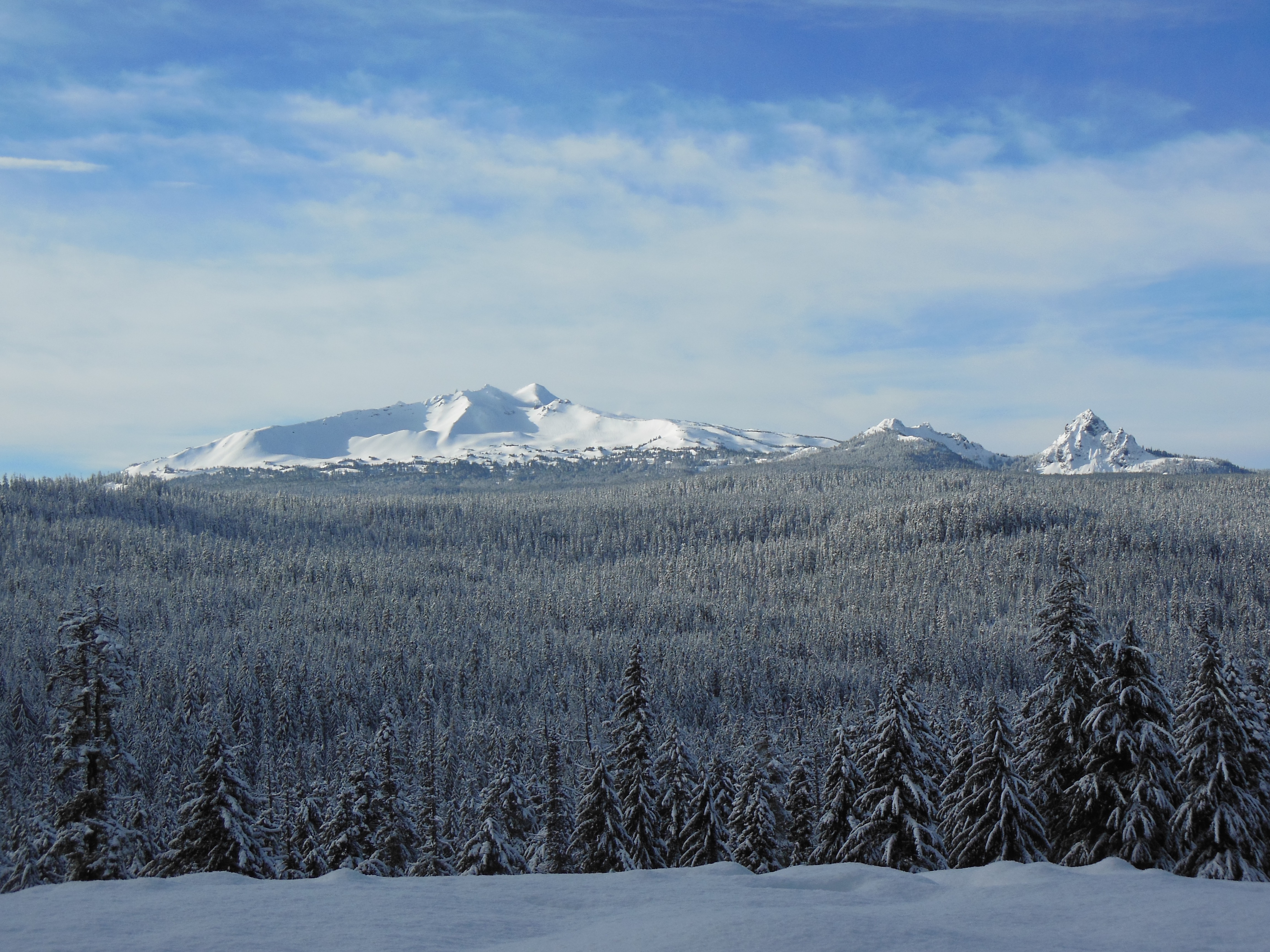
Diamond Peak seen from Oregon Route 58, with Mount Yoran at far right, in January 2016

Composed of 3.6 cubic miles (15 km^{3}) of basaltic andesite and 1.2 cubic miles (5 km^{3}) of andesite, Diamond Peak is a shield volcano, though it might be considered a "modest stratocone", because of its steep slopes and the pyroclastic materials at its core. Having produced andesite, Diamond Peak represents one of the few mafic shield volcanoes in the Cascades that are known to grade into andesite, along with Mount Defiance, Mount Bailey, Devils Peak, and Prospect Peak. It consists of a main cone made of pyroclastic material including palagonitized rock along with basaltic andesite cinders and glassy scoria, as well as thin layers of basaltic andesite lava flows. Diamond Peak has two overlapping volcanic cones, with the elder edifice making up its lower northern peak. The volcano does not show evidence of producing lahars.

Eruptive activity began at an eruptive vent by Diamond Peak's northern summit, and shortly after, eruptions commenced at a second, slightly higher vent closer to the southern summit. Though Diamond Peak's eruptions always produced olivine-rich basaltic andesite, they likely grew more rich in silicon dioxide over time, ranging from 55 to 58 percent silicon dioxide. Lava flows from the volcano vary from 6 to 30 feet (1.8 to 9.1 m) in thickness, rich in porphyritic rocks like olivine, plagioclase, and clinopyroxene; there is no silicic rock (rich in silica) in the Diamond Peak vicinity. Mazama Ash, including pumice up to 32 inches (81 cm) thick as well as plagioclase, pyroxene, and hornblende crystals, can be found throughout the Diamond Peak wilderness area and represents the newest volcanic rock deposited in the region. In total, eruptive output probably totaled 1.2 cubic miles (5 km^{3}) in volume.

The volcano is older than the last glacial period that ended 11,000 years ago, but probably younger than 100,000 years. Though its lava flows show residual magnetism, the volcano does not display evidence of activity within the past 10,000 years, suggesting that it may now be extinct. The lavas, intrusive volcanic rocks, and volcanic vents have largely gone unaltered by erosion or other geological processes besides sparse mineralization as a result of volcanic exhalative processes, though there are tiny amounts of specular hematite and malachite in cracks among lava flows.

Heavily eroded by glaciers, which no longer exist on Diamond Peak, the mountain has several cirques from glacial erosion, some of which have talus deposits due to Holocene glacial motion. Glaciers also placed both lateral and ground moraines along the lower to middle elevations of the wilderness area, unlayered pebble deposits interbedded with sand and rock. These deposits have very few weathering rinds, corresponding to their production during the late Pleistocene. Diamond Peak lies directly on the Cascade Crest and therefore receives a heavy snowpack. Snowfields on the northern side may have been glaciers as recently as 100 years ago.

=== Subfeatures ===
Nearby features include Crater Butte, a basaltic andesite cinder cone volcano 2.5 miles (4 km) to the southeast, and Redtop Mountain, 6.2 miles (10 km) to the east and composed of basalt. Both mountains are likely close to the same age as Diamond Peak, and are formed by layers of red and black lapilli, scoria, and volcanic bombs. The earliest strata have been converted to palagonite with a yellow-orange color that was derived from volcanic glass. Emigrant Butte, a basaltic andesite peak 5.6 miles (9 km) to the south, has been altered more extensively by glaciers, and therefore is likely older. Mount Yoran is a significantly older mountain made from basaltic andesite lava that has a summit protruding from the northern slope of Diamond Peak. It has been potassium–argon dated to be between 520,000 and 220,000 years old. A shield volcano,^{[b]} Yoran is often considered one of the subfeatures of Diamond Peak, along with the Diamond Rockpile cinder cone and Crater Butte. Yoran and the nearby stratovolcano Lakeview Mountain have similar compositions to Diamond Peak, with dissected cones made of pyroclastic material with embedded lava flows. Both volcanoes have been invaded with sills fed by dikes that can be traced to nearby volcanic plugs.

== Ecology ==
The ecology of Diamond Peak is characteristic of the Oregon Cascades. The forests supported by the wilderness area include flora such as lodgepole pine, western white pine, mountain hemlock, noble fir, and silver fir trees. Timberline is at an elevation of about 7,775 feet (2,370 m). Along Yoran Lake, there are forests of Engelmann spruce, silver fir, and noble fir, as well as a wet meadow.

Local fauna include common animals found in the Cascade Arc, such as Roosevelt elk, black-tailed deer, red squirrels, snowshoe hares, and a number of bird species. Predators like the American black bear and cougars are in the area. Trout species can be found throughout the wilderness lakes, brook trout and rainbow trout appearing the most often. The abundance of water supports mosquito populations, particularly during the early summer.

== Human history ==
William Macy and John Diamond climbed Diamond Peak in July 1852. These two men were part of a preliminary survey party known as the "Road Viewers." They climbed the peak in order to plan a road that later became known as the Free Emigrant Road. They named the peak for Diamond, who was a pioneer from Eugene. The road was completed in late September 1853, only days before some 1,027 people with 250 wagons arrived at the Deschutes River at what is now Bend. These emigrants, known as the "Lost Wagon Train of 1853," were following Elijah Elliott through the central Oregon high desert on what became known as the Elliott Cutoff. It took time to locate the road because it was 30 miles (48 km) upstream on the Deschutes. The road led them to Emigrant Pass by Summit Lake and then down the western side of the pass. In mid-October the emigrants were discovered on the Middle Fork Willamette River by the settlers of the upper Willamette Valley, and a large rescue operation was launched to help the emigrants reach the settlements. This emigration doubled the population of Lane County.

Diamond Peak and the surrounding wilderness area have not been the subject of any major mining operations. Besides old placers (accumulations of valuable minerals formed by gravity separation during sedimentary processes) that can be found along the Crescent Creek to the east of the Diamond Peak Wilderness, no mineral resources of interest have been identified in the local area. While cinder from the Red Mountain and Crater Butte cinder cones, estimated at a volume of 120 million cubic yards (92,000,000 m^{3}), might be useful for construction materials for road building, there is plenty of cinder and rock outside of the immediate vicinity of Diamond Peak. The closest mining operations took place in the Bohemia district, which lies 20 to 25 miles (32 to 40 km) to the west of Diamond Peak. Moreover, the volcano has little potential as a geothermal energy resource, since the surrounding area lacks hot springs. Therefore, in the 1980s, surveyors determined that there is little future potential for mineral deposits or geothermal energy resources for Diamond Peak or the wilderness area.

== Recreation ==
Though Diamond Peak cannot be accessed by paved roads, it lies adjacent on its eastern side to the Pacific Crest Trail. Although the mountain lacks a clearly denoted trail to the top, and itself has multiple peaks, which can make identification of the summit difficult, summitting Diamond Peak is not a technical climb. Instead, it is a physically demanding hike and scramble that climbs 4,100 feet (1,200 m) and runs for 10 to 12 miles (16 to 19 km), lasting between six and eight hours. Climbers can access Diamond Peak from two major trailheads at Rockpile and Summit Lake to the southeast of Oakridge and Eugene. The two major routes to the southern summit offer views of Summit Lake and Mount Thielsen.

Another route for climbing Diamond Peak begins from Corrigan Lake, which can be reached by forest roads about 30 miles (48 km) past Hills Creek Reservoir near Oakridge. The Corrigan Lake Trailhead starts at an elevation of 5,536 feet (1,687 m), following a forested trail toward Diamond Peak's western flank. A challenging trip, it may demand the use of crampons (traction devices attached to footwear to improve mobility on snow and ice) and an ice axe if conditions dictate. Because of avalanche hazards on the western side of Diamond Peak, the route can be dangerous. The climb runs about 8 miles (13 km) for the round trip, achieving the peak's elevation of 8,748 feet (2,666 m).

== Notes ==
- [a] This is the acreage given by the United States Forest Service websites; Wuerthner (2003) lists the acreage as 52,337 acres (211.80 km^{2}).
- [b] Sherrod et al. (1983) list Mount Yoran as a stratovolcano.

== Sources ==
- Andersen, S. (2001). Snowshoe Routes: Oregon. The Mountaineers Books.
- Harris, S. L. (2005). "Chapter 11: Oregon's Matterhorns". Fire Mountains of the West: The Cascade and Mono Lake Volcanoes (Third ed.). Missoula, Montana: Mountain Press Publishing Company. ISBN 0-87842-511-X.
- Hildreth, W. (2007). Quaternary Magmatism in the Cascades, Geologic Perspectives. United States Geological Survey. Professional Paper 1744.
- Joslin, L. (2005). The Wilderness Concept and the Three Sisters Wilderness: Deschutes and Willamette National Forests, Oregon. Bend, Oregon: Wilderness Associates. ISBN 978-0-9647167-4-2.
- Langille, H. D. (1903). Forest Conditions in the Cascade Range Forest Reserve, Oregon, Issues 9-10. U.S. Government Printing Office.
- Sherrod, D. R.; Moyle, P. R.; Rurasey, C. M.; MacLeod, N. S. (1983). Geology and mineral resource potential map of the Diamond Peak Wilderness, Lane and Klamath Counties, Oregon: Open-File Report 83-661 (PDF). United States Geological Survey.
- Wood, C. A.; Kienle, J. (1992). Volcanoes of North America. Cambridge University Press. ISBN 0-521-43811-X.
- Wuerthner, G. (2003). Oregon's Wilderness Areas: The Complete Guide. Westcliffe Publishers. ISBN 1-56579-434-6.
