= Sawtooth Crater =

Extinct shield volcano in Baker and Union counties, Oregon

Highest point
- Coordinates: 44°58′32″N 117°32′32″W

Geology
- Mountain type: Shield volcano

Sawtooth Crater, also known as Sawtooth Ridge, is a shield volcano and volcanic crater in Baker and Union counties of Oregon.

== Geography ==
Sawtooth Crater is bordered to the north and northeast by the Wallowa Mountains and is located northeast of Baker City, Oregon.

== Geology ==
Sawtooth Crater is a shield volcano of unknown age. It has a volcanic plug and two radial dikes. It also has olivine basalt and platy andesite.

== Hiking ==
Sawtooth Crater can be hiked to via a road used by the U.S. Forest Service road that starts at Medical Springs.
