= Bonneville Mountain =

Mountain in Oregon, United States

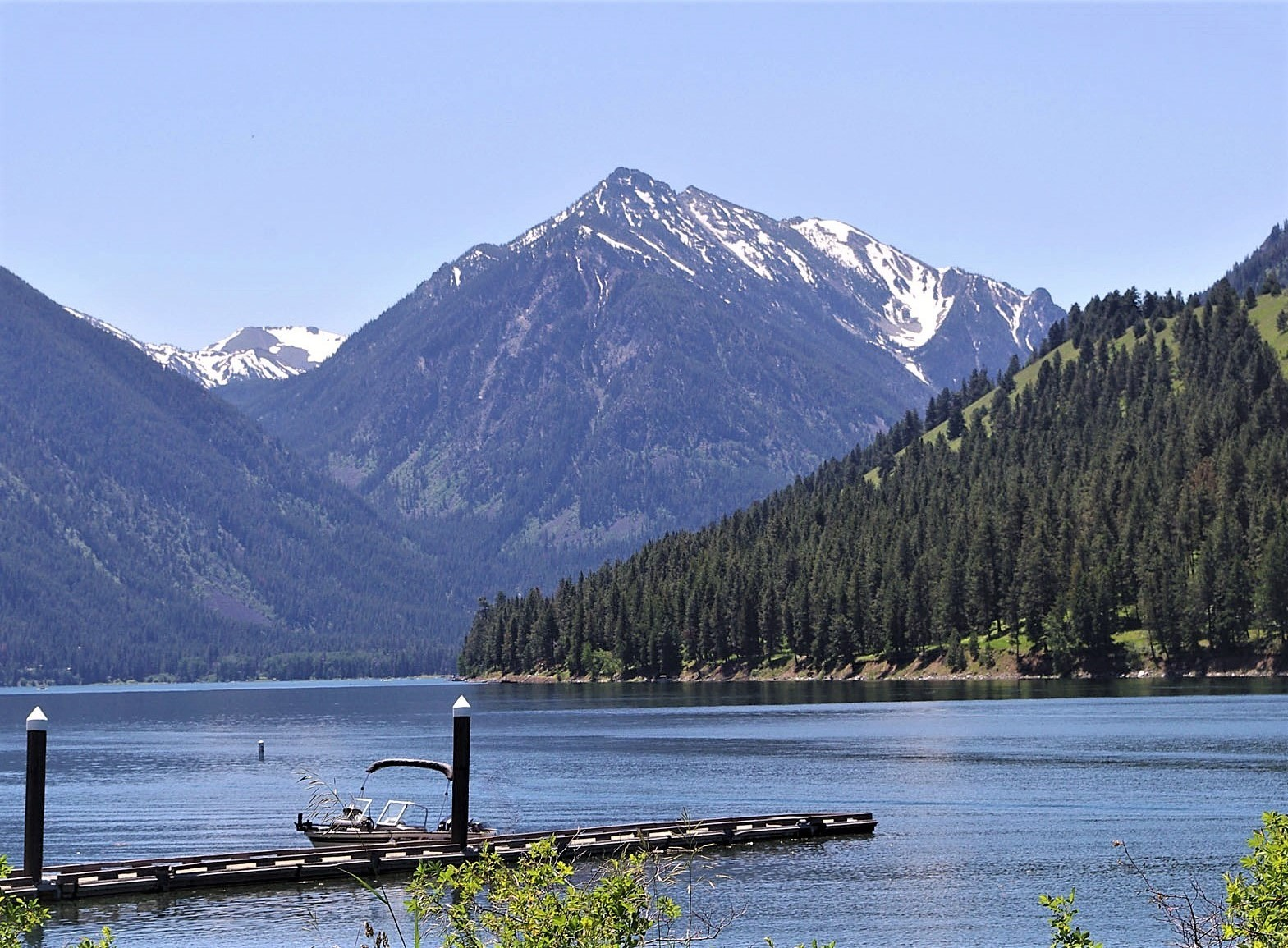
- North aspect, from Wallowa Lake

Highest point
- Elevation: 8,140 ft (2,481 m)
- Prominence: 40 ft (12 m)
- Isolation: 1.68 mi (2.70 km)
- Coordinates: 45°14′38″N 117°12′36″W

Naming
- Etymology: Benjamin Bonneville

Geography
- Location within Oregon Location within the United States
- Location: Eagle Cap Wilderness
- Country: United States of America
- State: Oregon
- County: Wallowa
- Parent range: Wallowa Mountains
- Topo map: USGS Aneroid Mountain

Climbing
- Easiest route: scrambling east side

Bonneville Mountain is an 8,140-foot elevation (2,481 m) mountain summit located in Wallowa County, Oregon, US.

== Description ==
Bonneville Mountain is located eight miles south of Joseph, Oregon, in the Wallowa Mountains. It is set within the Eagle Cap Wilderness on land managed by Wallowa–Whitman National Forest. The peak is situated south of Wallowa Lake and precipitation runoff from the mountain drains west into West Fork Wallowa River and east into the East Fork. Topographic relief is significant as the summit rises over 3,700 feet (1,100 meters) above the lake in approximately three miles.

== Etymology ==
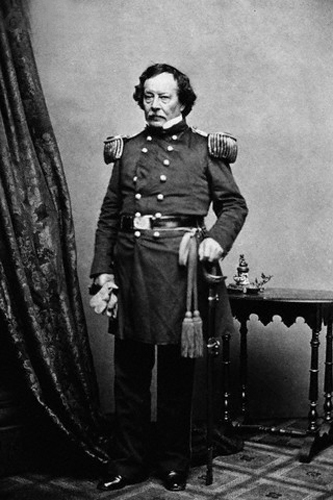
Bonneville

This landform's toponym was officially adopted in 1925 by the United States Board on Geographic Names to honor Benjamin Bonneville (1796–1878), an officer in the United States Army and explorer of the American West noted for his expeditions to the Oregon Country. Captain Bonneville and his party are credited with the first documented entry into the Wallowa Valley by a non-native in 1834. This mountain was originally known as Middle Mountain.

== Climate ==
Based on the Köppen climate classification, Chief Joseph Mountain is located in a subarctic climate zone characterized by long, usually very cold winters, and mild summers. Winter temperatures can drop below −10 °F with wind chill factors below −20 °F. Most precipitation in the area is caused by orographic lift. Thunderstorms are common in the summer.

== See also ==
- List of mountain peaks of Oregon

== Gallery ==
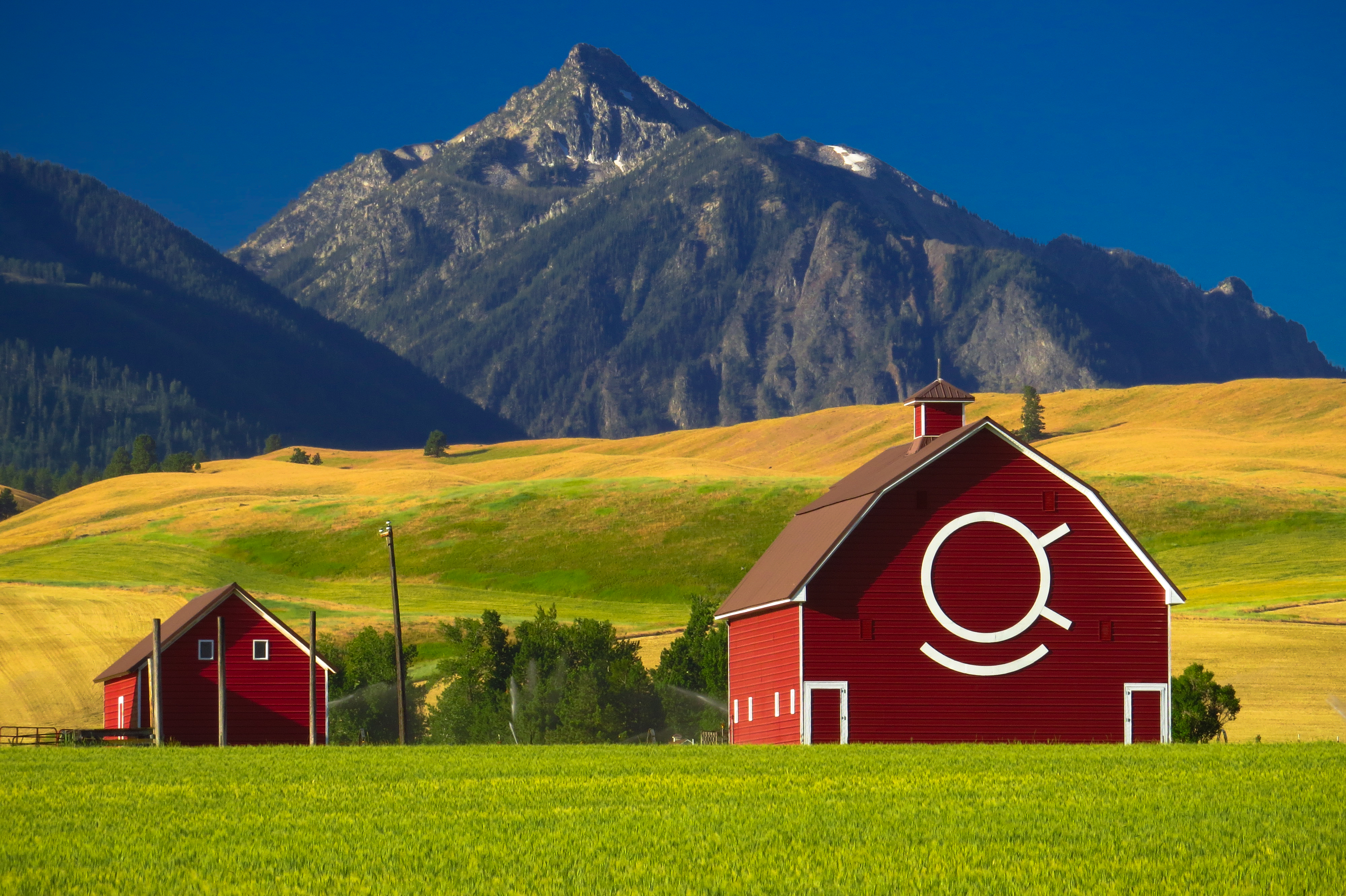
Bonneville Mountain seen from Rocking OK Ranch

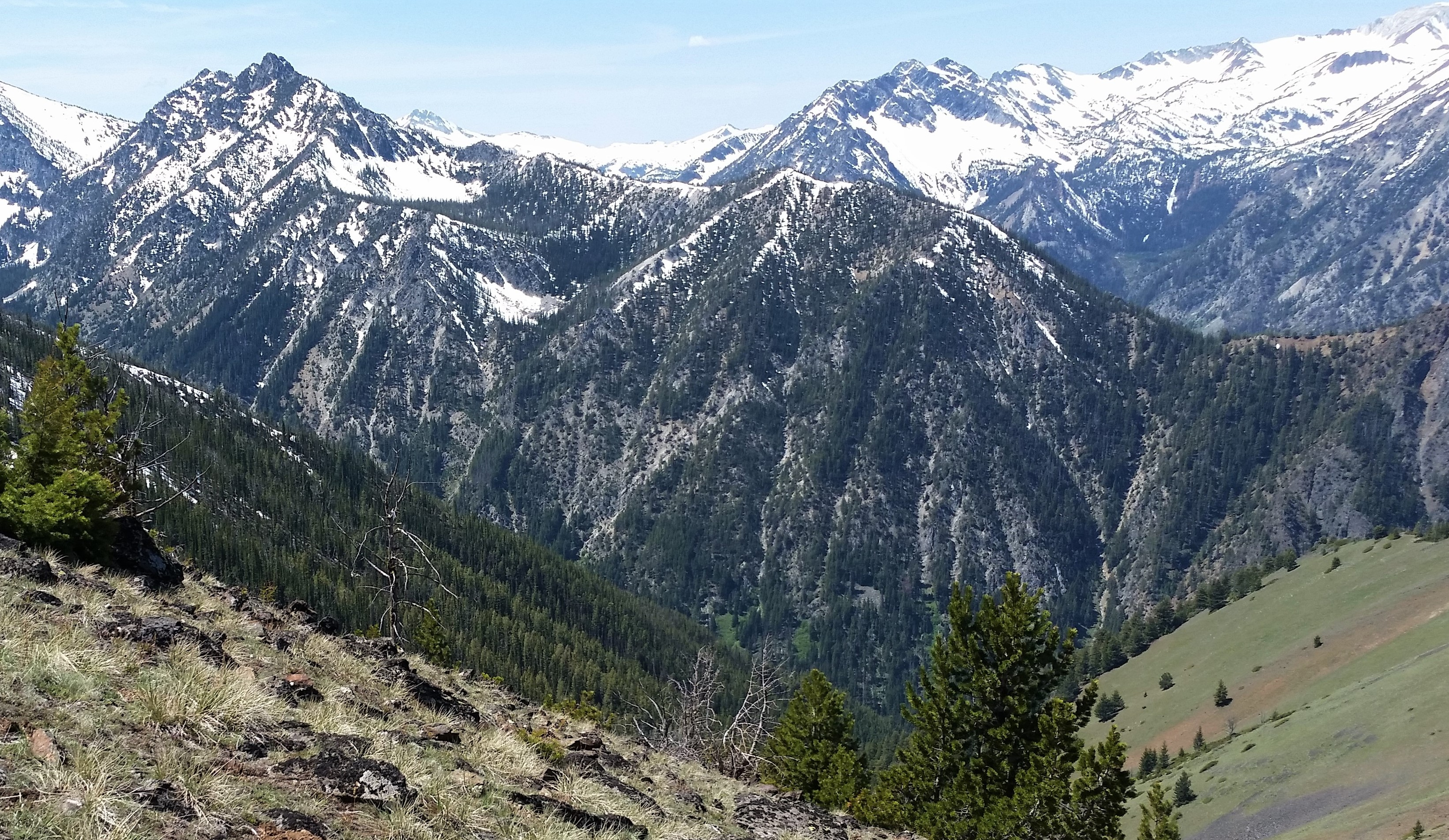
Bonneville Mountain seen from Mt. Howard.

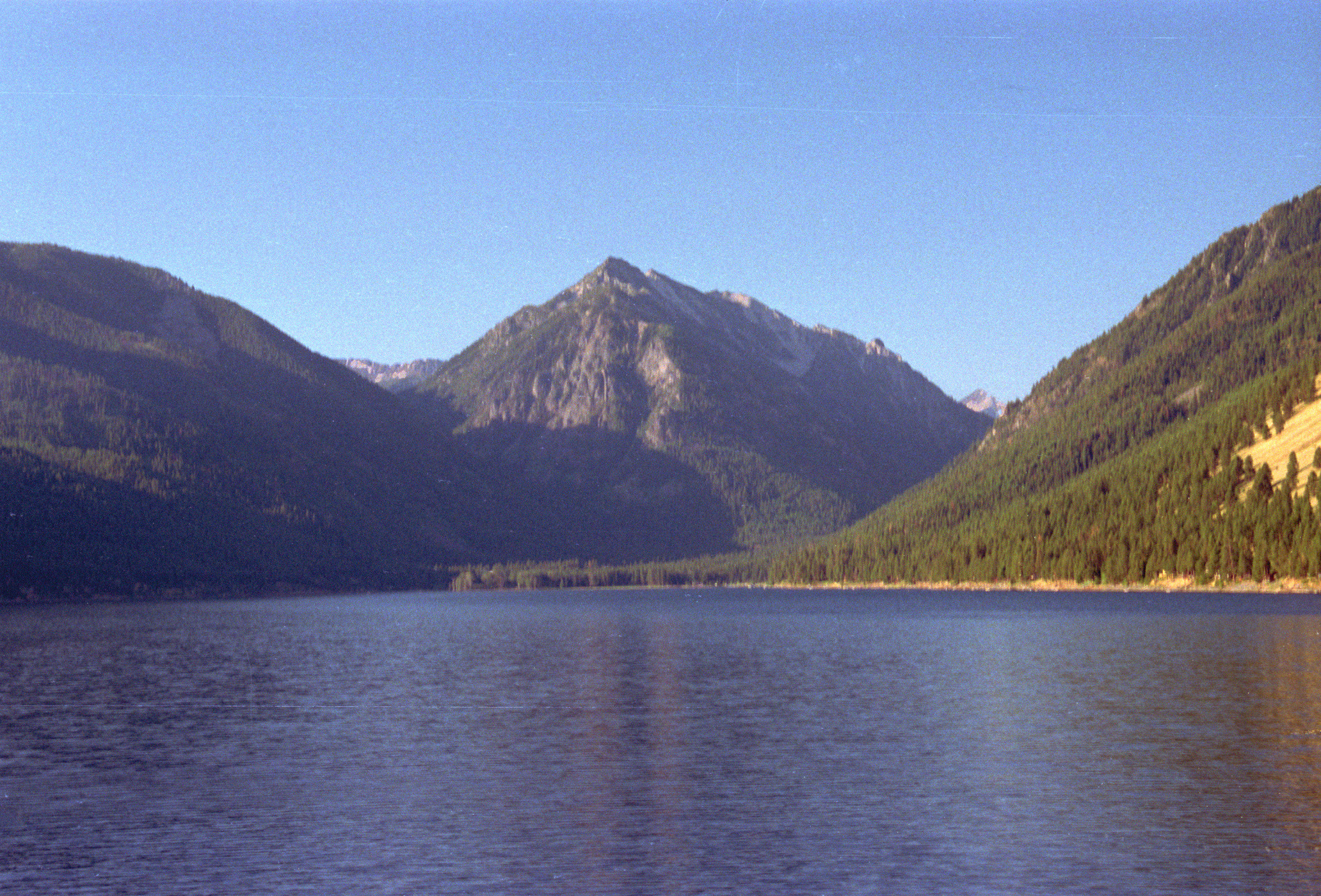

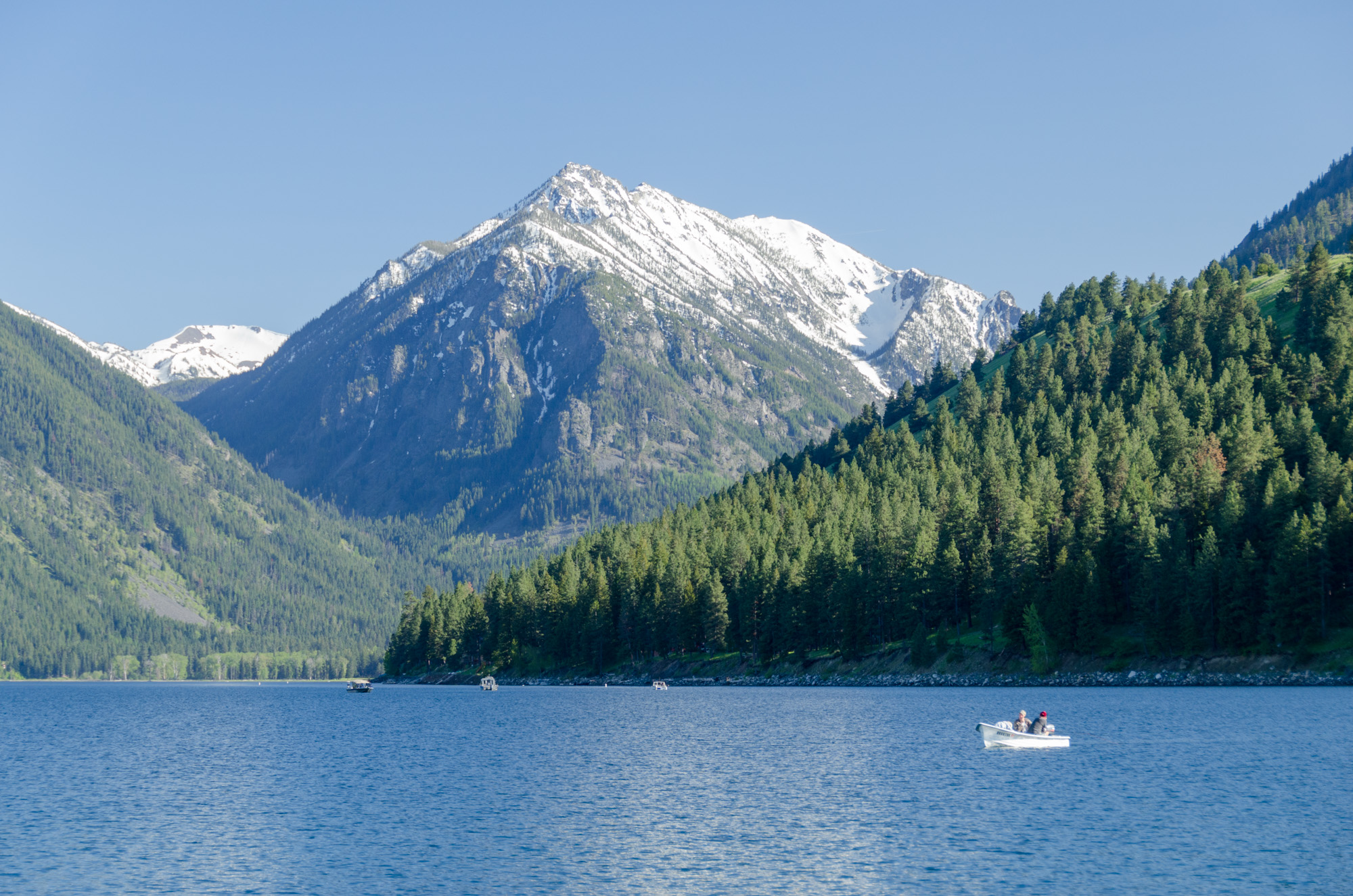
North aspect from the north end of Wallowa Lake.
