= Benjamin Bonneville =

U.S. Army officer, fur trapper and explorer (1796–1878)

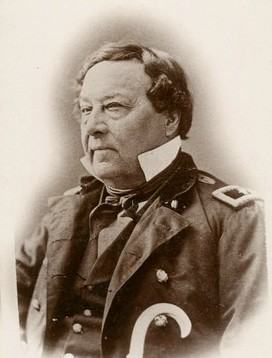
- Born: Benjamin Louis Eulalie de Bonneville; April 14, 1796 near Paris, French First Republic
- Died: June 12, 1878 (aged 82); Fort Smith, Arkansas, United States
- Burial place: Bellefontaine Cemetery, St. Louis, Missouri, United States
- Military career
- Allegiance: United States; Union
- Branch: United States Army; Union Army
- Service years: 1815–1866
- Rank: Colonel; Brevet Brigadier General
- Commands: 3rd U.S. Infantry; Department of New Mexico
- Conflicts: Second Seminole War; Mexican–American War; Siege of Veracruz; Battle of Cerro Gordo; Battle of Contreras; Battle of Churubusco; Battle of Molino del Rey; Battle of Chapultepec; American Civil War

Benjamin Louis Eulalie de Bonneville (French pronunciation: [bɛ̃ʒamɛ̃ lwi ølali də bɔnvil]; April 14, 1796 – June 12, 1878) was an American officer in the United States Army, fur trapper, and explorer in the American West. He is noted for his expeditions to the Oregon Country and the Great Basin, and in particular for blazing portions of the Oregon Trail.

During his lifetime, Bonneville was made famous by an account of his explorations in the West written by Washington Irving.

== Early life ==
Benjamin was born in or near Paris, France, the son of the French publisher Nicholas Bonneville and his wife Marguerite Brazier. When he was seven, his family moved to the United States; their passage was paid by Thomas Paine. Paine had lodged with the Bonnevilles in France and was godfather to Benjamin and his two brothers, Louis and Thomas. In his will, Paine left the bulk of his estate to Marguerite who had cared for him until he died in 1809. The inheritance included 100 acres (40.5 ha) of his New Rochelle, New York farm where they had been living, so she could maintain and educate her sons.

== Early career ==
In 1813 Bonneville received an appointment to the United States Military Academy at West Point, New York. He graduated after only two years, receiving a commission as brevet second lieutenant of light artillery. In his early career, he served at posts in New England, Mississippi, and at Fort Smith in the Arkansas Territory.

In 1824, he was taken to Fort Gibson in the Indian Territory and promoted to captain. While traveling to France, he was a guest of General Lafayette. After returning from France, he was transferred in 1828 to Jefferson Barracks in Missouri.

While in Missouri, Bonneville was inspired by the writing of Hall J. Kelley, as well as editorials in the St. Louis Enquirer (edited at the time by Thomas Hart Benton) to join in the exploration of the American West. Bonneville met with Kelley, who was impressed by him and appointed him to lead one of the expeditions to the Oregon Country; it was scheduled to leave in early 1832. The lack of volunteers for the expedition forced the delay and eventual cancellation of the expedition, leaving Bonneville unrequited in his ambitions.

To pursue his desire to explore the west, he petitioned General Alexander Macomb for a leave of absence from the military, arguing that he would be able to perform valuable reconnaissance among the Native Americans in the Oregon Country, which at the time was under a precarious joint occupation of the U.S. and Britain. It was largely controlled by the Hudson's Bay Company. Macomb granted his request, a 26-month leave running from August 1831 to October 1833, and instructed him to gather all information that might be useful to the government. In particular, he was to pose as a fur trader and find out the natural history of the region, its climates, soils, geography, topography, mineral production, geology, and the character of the local tribes. Expenses for his exploration were paid by private donors, including Astorian Alfred Seton and possibly John Jacob Astor.

== Marriage and family ==
Bonneville married and had a daughter with his wife. After both his first wife and daughter died, he did not remarry until after retiring from the military in 1866, when he settled in Fort Smith, Arkansas. There he married Sue Neis.

== Expedition of 1832 ==
The expedition that would be known as the most notable accomplishment of his life began in May 1832, when Bonneville left Missouri with 110 men, with field lieutenants Michael Cerre and Joseph R. Walker. The voyage was financed by John Jacob Astor, a rival of the Hudson's Bay Company. The expedition proceeded from Fort Osage on the Missouri River, up to the Platte River, and across present-day Wyoming. It reached the Green River in August and built a fur trading post, which it named Fort Bonneville. The mountain men called it "Fort Nonsense" and it was never used for trading.

In the spring of 1833, Bonneville explored along the Snake River in present-day Idaho, drifting into the head of the Salmon River and eventually into Fort Nez Perce. During this trip he engaged a guide, John Enos (Enos), a 10-year-old Shoshone nephew of Gourd Rattler (Washakie) and Pahdasherwahundah (Iron Wristbands); Enos later served as a scout for the Fremont expedition.

He also sent a party of men under Walker to explore the Great Salt Lake and find an overland route to California. Walker discovered a route along the Humboldt River across present-day Nevada, as well as Walker Pass across the Sierra Nevada. The path later became known as the California Trail, the primary route for immigrants to the gold fields during the California Gold Rush. Much speculation has surrounded Bonneville's motivation for sending Walker to California. Some historians have speculated that he was attempting to lay the groundwork for an eventual invasion of California, then part of Mexico, by the United States Army.

John McLoughlin, the director of the Columbia operations of the Hudson's Bay Company at Fort Vancouver on the Columbia River, heard of Bonneville's mission. He forbade his traders from doing business with Bonneville and his men. Bonneville reported that many of the Native Americans he encountered in the Snake River were also reluctant to displease the Hudson's Bay Company by trading with Americans.

In the summer of 1833, Bonneville ventured into the Wind River Range in present-day Wyoming to trade with the Shoshone. By this time, he realized that he would not be able to return east by October as planned. He wrote a lengthy letter to General Macomb summarizing some of his findings and requesting more time, specifically to survey the Columbia River and parts of the Southwest before his return.

== Trying to reach Oregon ==
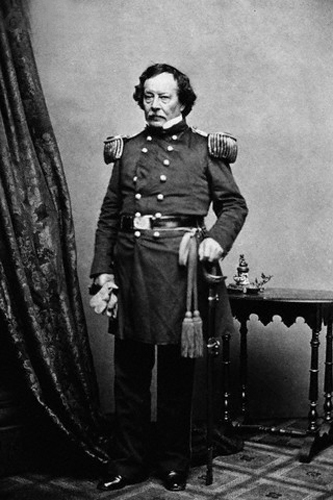
Benjamin Louis Eulalie de Bonneville

After spending the early winter at Fort Bonneville, he set out westward in January 1834 with the goal of reaching the Willamette Valley. He and his men traveled down the Snake River, through Hells Canyon, and into the Wallowa Mountains, where they found a hospitable welcome by the Nez Perces along the Imnaha River.

On March 4, 1834, they reached Fort Nez Perces, the outpost of the Hudson's Bay Company at the confluence of the Walla Walla River with the Columbia. Pierre Pambrun, the HBC commander of the fort, welcomed him but refused to do business with him. Empty handed, Bonneville and men retraced their course back to southeast Idaho and made camp on the Portneuf River.

In July he made a second trip west, determined to trade with the Hudson's Bay Company. He followed an easier route across the Blue Mountains, where he met Nathaniel Wyeth once again and camped along the Grande Ronde River. By this time he and his men had become desperate for food and supplies. At Fort Nez Perces, they found the same rejection from Pambrun. Instead of returning immediately east, Bonneville and men journeyed down the Columbia towards Fort Vancouver. Along the river, he attempted to trade with Sahaptins but without success. He came to realize that he would probably receive the same rejection from McLoughlin at Fort Vancouver and decided to turn back east.

He spent the winter of 1834–35 with the Shoshone along the upper Bear River, and in April 1835 began the voyage back to Missouri. He reached Independence by August and discovered that although his letter requesting an extension had arrived, it had not been delivered to Macomb. In the meantime, his commission had been revoked.

== Washington Irving ==
Bonneville journeyed east hoping to be able to recover his commission. On the way to Washington, D.C., he stopped in New York City where he was received by his patron John Jacob Astor. While staying with Astor, Bonneville met Washington Irving. Bonneville regaled Irving with tales of his adventures, tales that Bonneville planned to include in a book he was working on.

A month or two later, Irving visited Bonneville again, at the D.C. barracks where the latter was staying. Bonneville was having difficulties writing his adventures. The two of them agreed that for the sum of $1000 ($29,318 in 2025 dollars), Bonneville would turn over his maps and notes so that Irving could use them as the basis for his third "Western" book. The result was The Adventures of Captain Bonneville, published in 1837.

== More military service ==
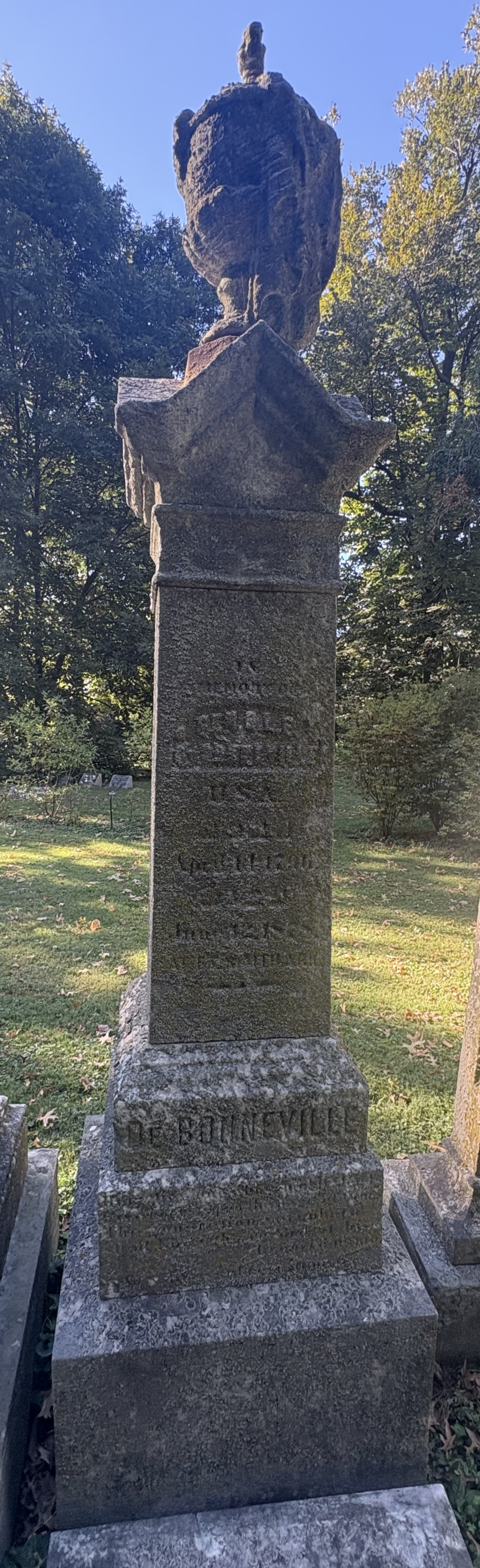
Bonneville's grave at Bellefontaine Cemetery

In Washington, Bonneville petitioned tirelessly to Secretary of War Lewis Cass to have his commission reinstated. In early 1836 he was successful. In subsequent years, he was given assignments on the western frontier at Fort Kearny in the Nebraska Territory and in the New Mexico Territory at Fort Fillmore, where he became the commander of the third infantry regiment on February 3, 1855, after the death of Colonel Thomas Staniford. He also served in the Mexican–American War, taking part in the Veracruz campaign of Winfield Scott. He was part of the occupation of Mexico City. He was promoted to colonel of the 3rd Infantry Regiment in 1855, and twice commanded the Department of New Mexico.

Bonneville retired from active service in 1861 but was soon recalled to duty during the Civil War. From 1861 to 1863 he served as superintendent of recruiting in Missouri, and from 1862 to 1865 as commander of Benton Barracks in St. Louis. At the end of the war he was breveted as a brigadier general in honor of his long and distinguished career.

He retired a second time in 1866 and moved to Fort Smith, Arkansas, where he married Sue Neis.

Bonneville died at age 82 in 1878. He is buried at Bellefontaine Cemetery in St. Louis, Missouri.

Bonneville was eligible to join both the Aztec Club of 1847 and the Military Order of the Loyal Legion of the United States, military societies for officers who had served in the Mexican War and American Civil War, respectively, but he did not join either.

== Dates of rank ==
- Cadet, United States Military Academy – April 14, 1813
- Brevet 2nd Lieutenant, Light Artillery – December 11, 1815
- 2nd Lieutenant, 8th Infantry – March 10, 1819
- 1st Lieutenant, 8th Infantry – July 9, 1820
- 1st Lieutenant, 7th Infantry – June 1, 1821
- Captain, 7th Infantry – October 4, 1825
- Dropped – March 31, 1834
- Reinstated – April 19, 1836
- Major, 6th Infantry – July 15, 1845
- Brevet Lieutenant Colonel – August 20, 1847
- Lieutenant Colonel, 4th Infantry – May 7, 1849
- Colonel, 3rd Infantry – February 3, 1855
- Retired – September 9, 1861
- Brevet Brigadier General – March 13, 1865

== Namesakes ==
Bonneville's namesakes include:

- Booneville, Arkansas, an altered spelling of Bonneville
- Bonneville Avenue, Las Vegas, Nevada
- Bonneville County, Idaho
- Bonneville Mountain, Wallowa Mountains of Oregon
- Bonneville Salt Flats
- Bonneville Shoreline Trail
- Lake Bonneville, the Pleistocene ancestor of the Great Salt Lake
- Bonneville Slide
- Bonneville Peak in the Portneuf Range
- Bonneville High School in Idaho Falls, Idaho
- Bonneville High School in Washington Terrace, Utah
- Bonneville Elementary School in Salt Lake City, Utah
- Bonneville Dam, after which the Bonneville Power Administration (BPA) was named
- Pontiac Bonneville, an automobile produced by General Motors from 1957 to 2005
- Triumph Bonneville, a line of motorcycles made by the British company Triumph
- Bonneville International, a broadcasting company
- The Bonneville House, Event Center in Fort Smith, Arkansas, once home to Sue Neis
- Bonneville (crater) on Mars.
- SS Benjamin Bonneville, a World War II Liberty Ship.
