= Chief Joseph Mountain =

Mountain peak in Oregon, United States

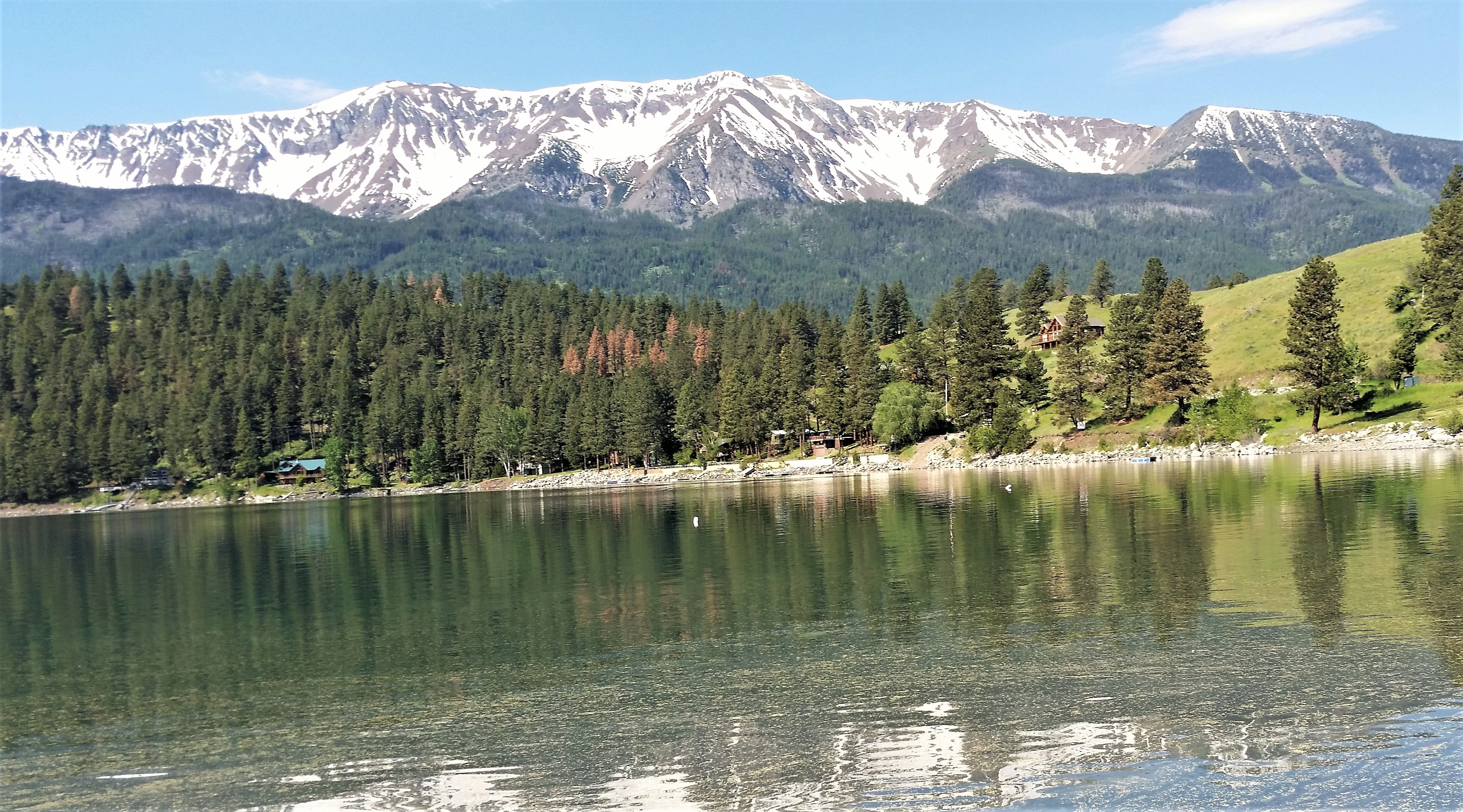
- Northeast aspect, from Wallowa Lake

Highest point
- Elevation: 9,616 ft (2,931 m)
- Prominence: 776 ft (237 m)
- Parent peak: Hurwal Divide (9,776 ft)
- Isolation: 1.83 mi (2.95 km)
- Coordinates: 45°17′08″N 117°15′42″W

Naming
- Etymology: Chief Joseph

Geography
- Location within Oregon Location within the United States
- Location: Eagle Cap Wilderness
- Country: United States of America
- State: Oregon
- County: Wallowa
- Parent range: Wallowa Mountains
- Topo map: USGS Chief Joseph Mountain

Geology
- Rock age: Miocene
- Rock type: Columbia River basalt

Climbing
- Easiest route: scrambling

Chief Joseph Mountain is a 9,616-foot elevation (2,931 m) mountain summit located in Wallowa County, Oregon, US.

== Description ==
Chief Joseph Mountain is located five miles south of Joseph, Oregon, in the Wallowa Mountains. It is set within the Eagle Cap Wilderness on land managed by Wallowa–Whitman National Forest. The peak ranks as the 14th-highest summit in Oregon, and the 8th-highest of the Wallowa Mountains. The peak is situated southwest of Wallowa Lake and precipitation runoff from the mountain drains into tributaries of the Wallowa River. Topographic relief is significant as the summit rises over 5,200 feet (1,600 meters) above the lake in approximately three miles. The bulk of the mountain is a complex geology of Mesozoic granodiorite of the Wallowa Batholith, limestone, greenstone, and a small relict summit cap composed of Columbia River basalt.

== Etymology ==
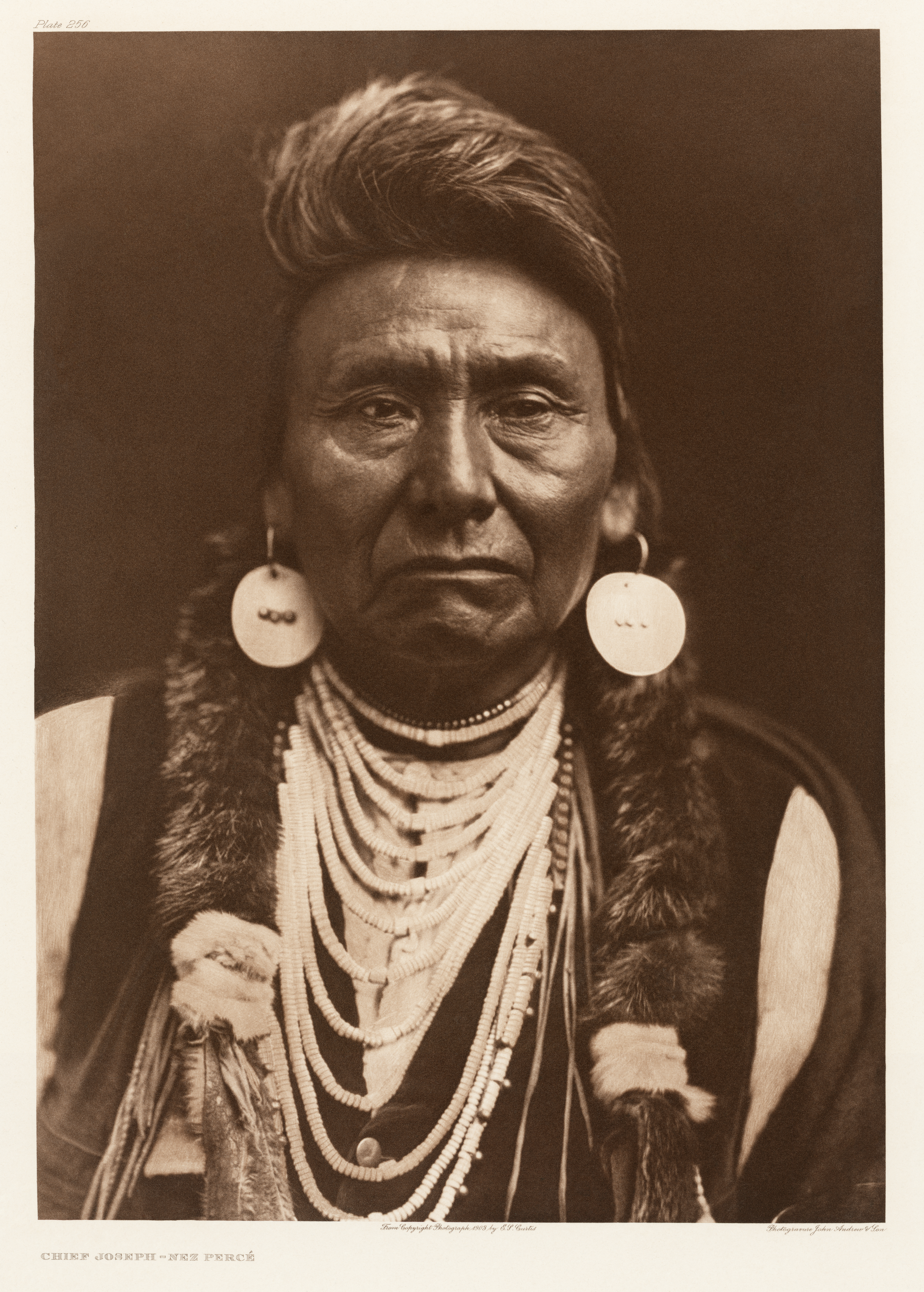
Chief Joseph by Edward Sheriff Curtis, 1903

This landform's toponym was officially adopted in 1925 by the United States Board on Geographic Names to honor Chief Joseph (1840–1904), leader of the Wal-lam-wat-kain (Wallowa) band of Nez Perce tribe. Chief Joseph led his band of Nez Perce during the most tumultuous period in their history, when they were forcibly removed by the United States federal government from their ancestral lands in the Wallowa Valley. Ironically, Mount Howard which is immediately across the Wallowa Valley from Chief Joseph Mountain is named after Oliver Otis Howard, the Army officer responsible for evicting Chief Joseph in 1877. "Point Joseph" is an alternate official name for the summit and "Tunnel Mountain" has also been used in the past. The nearby town of Joseph is also named after him.

== Climate ==
Based on the Köppen climate classification, Chief Joseph Mountain is located in a subarctic climate zone characterized by long, usually very cold winters, and mild summers. Winter temperatures can drop below −10 °F with wind chill factors below −20 °F. Most precipitation in the area is caused by orographic lift.

== Gallery ==
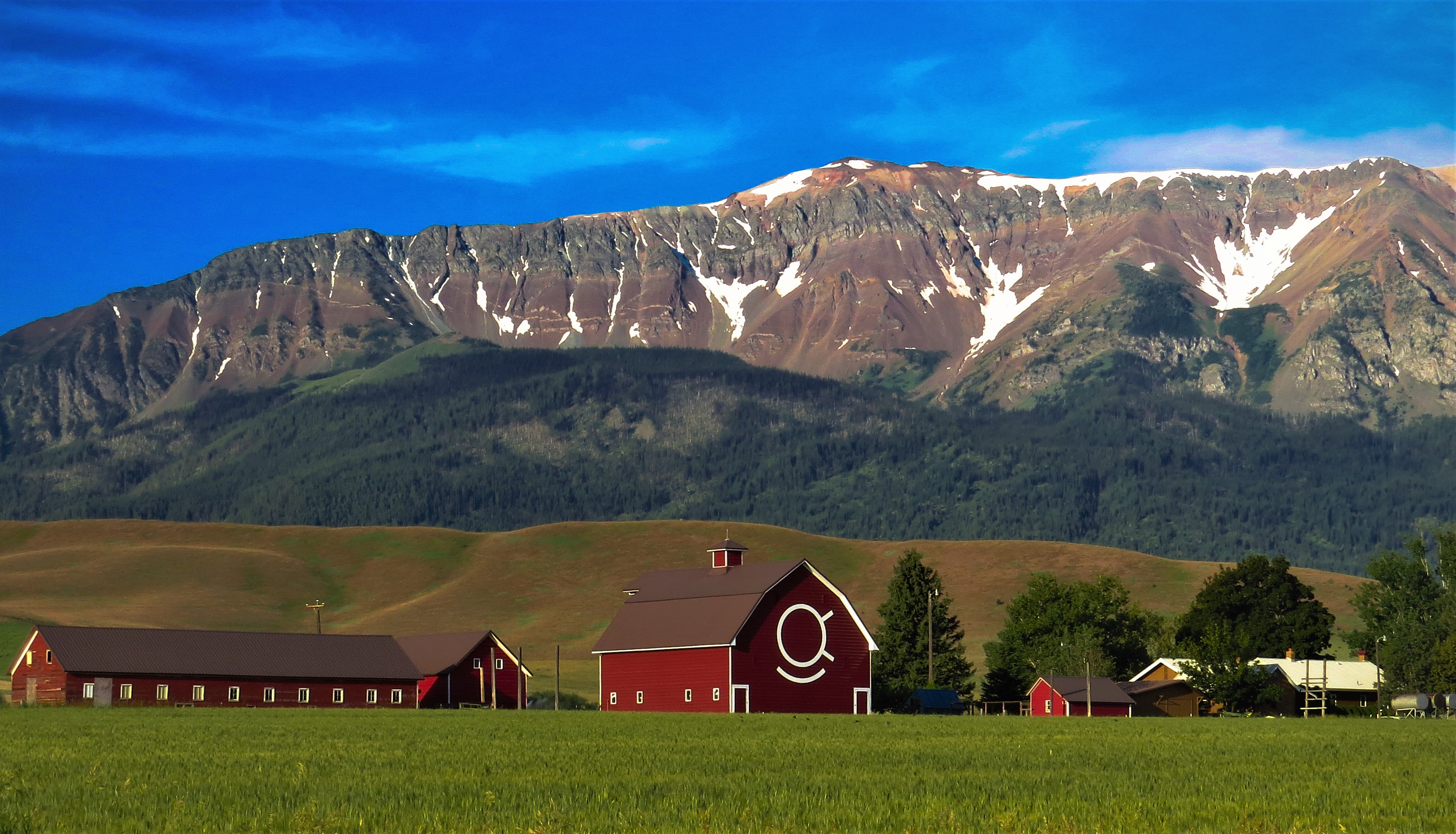
Northeast aspect

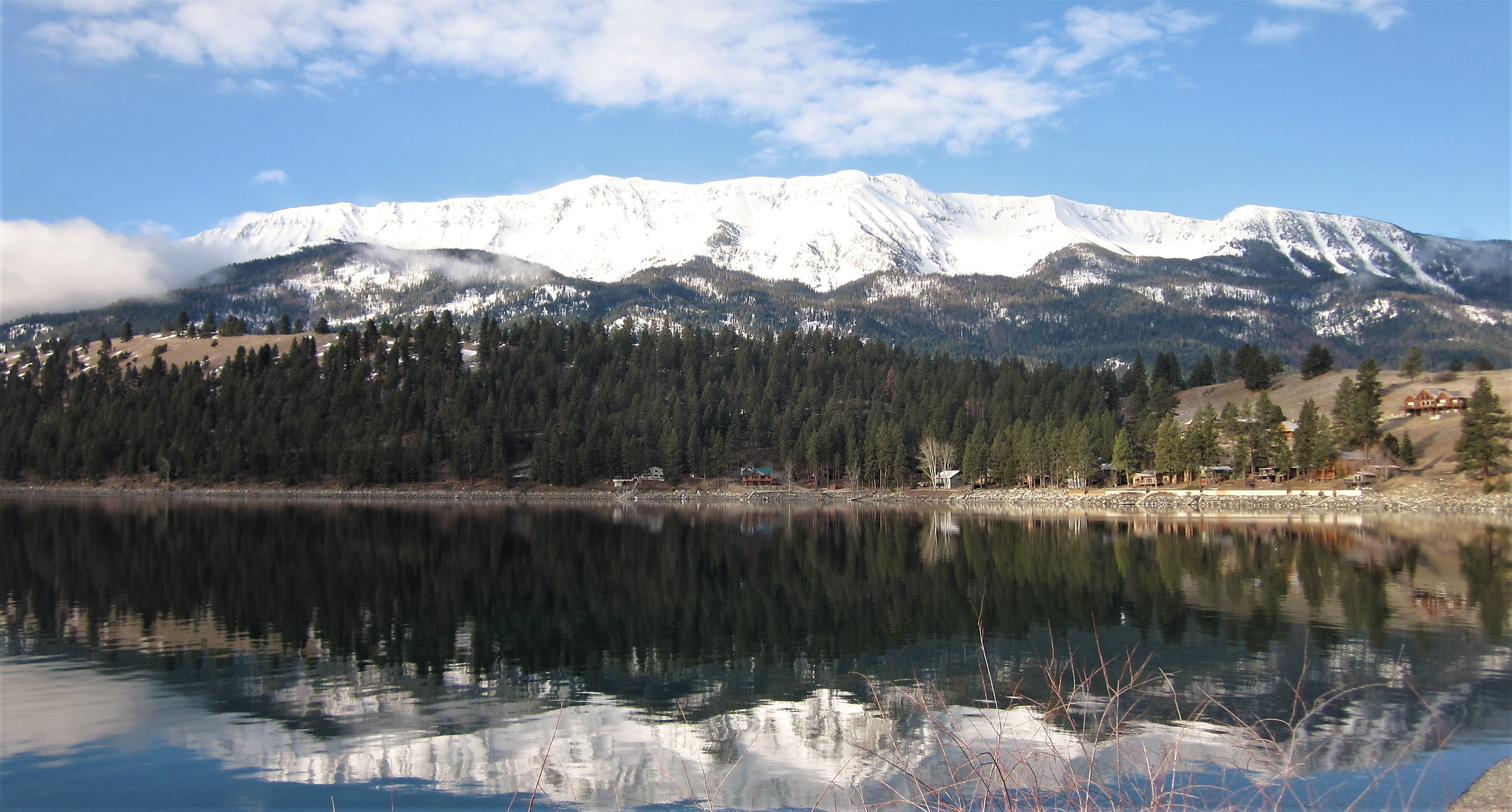
North-northeast aspect of Chief Joseph Mountain reflected in Wallowa Lake

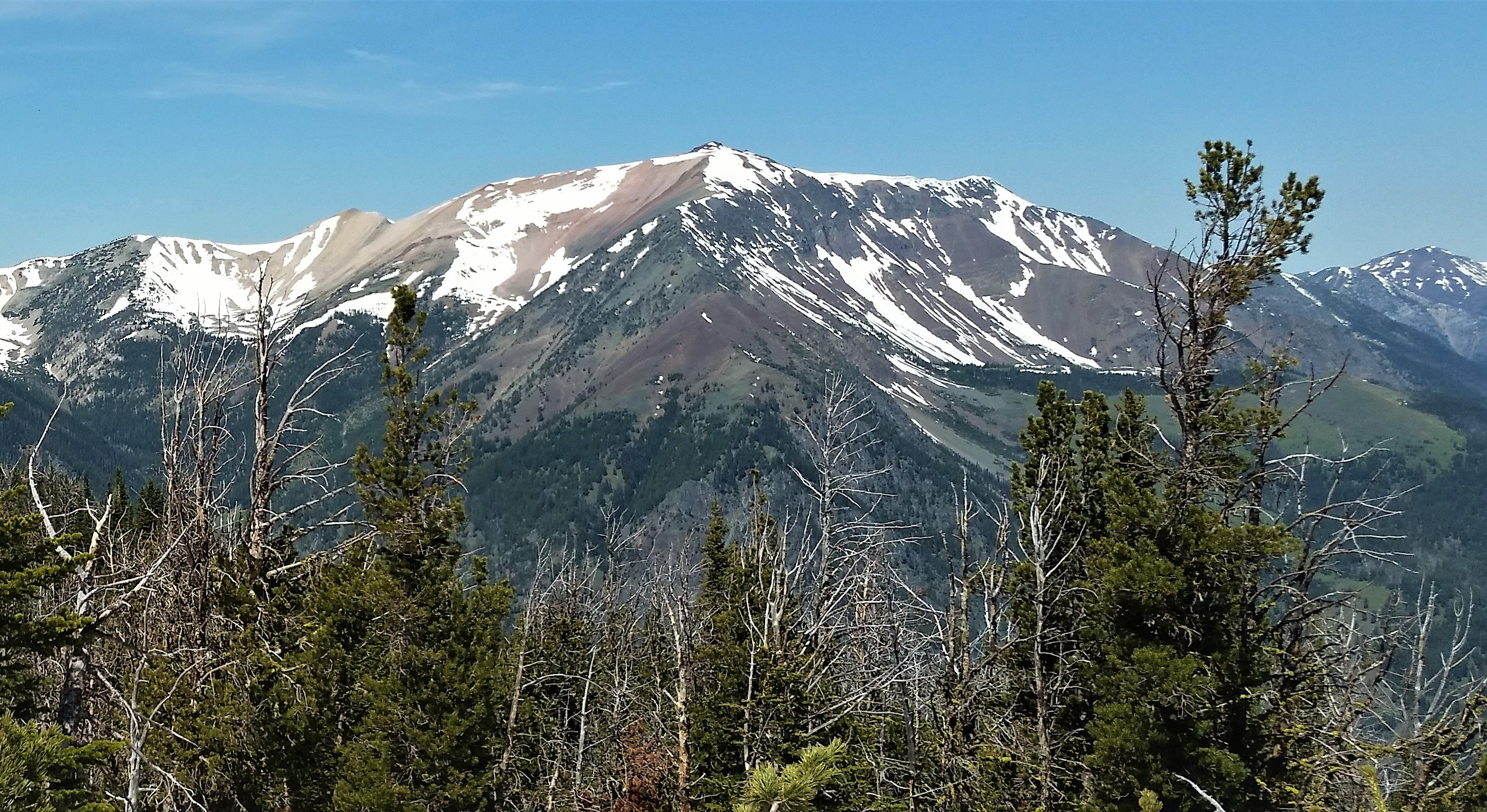
East-southeast aspect of Chief Joseph Mountain seen from Mount Howard

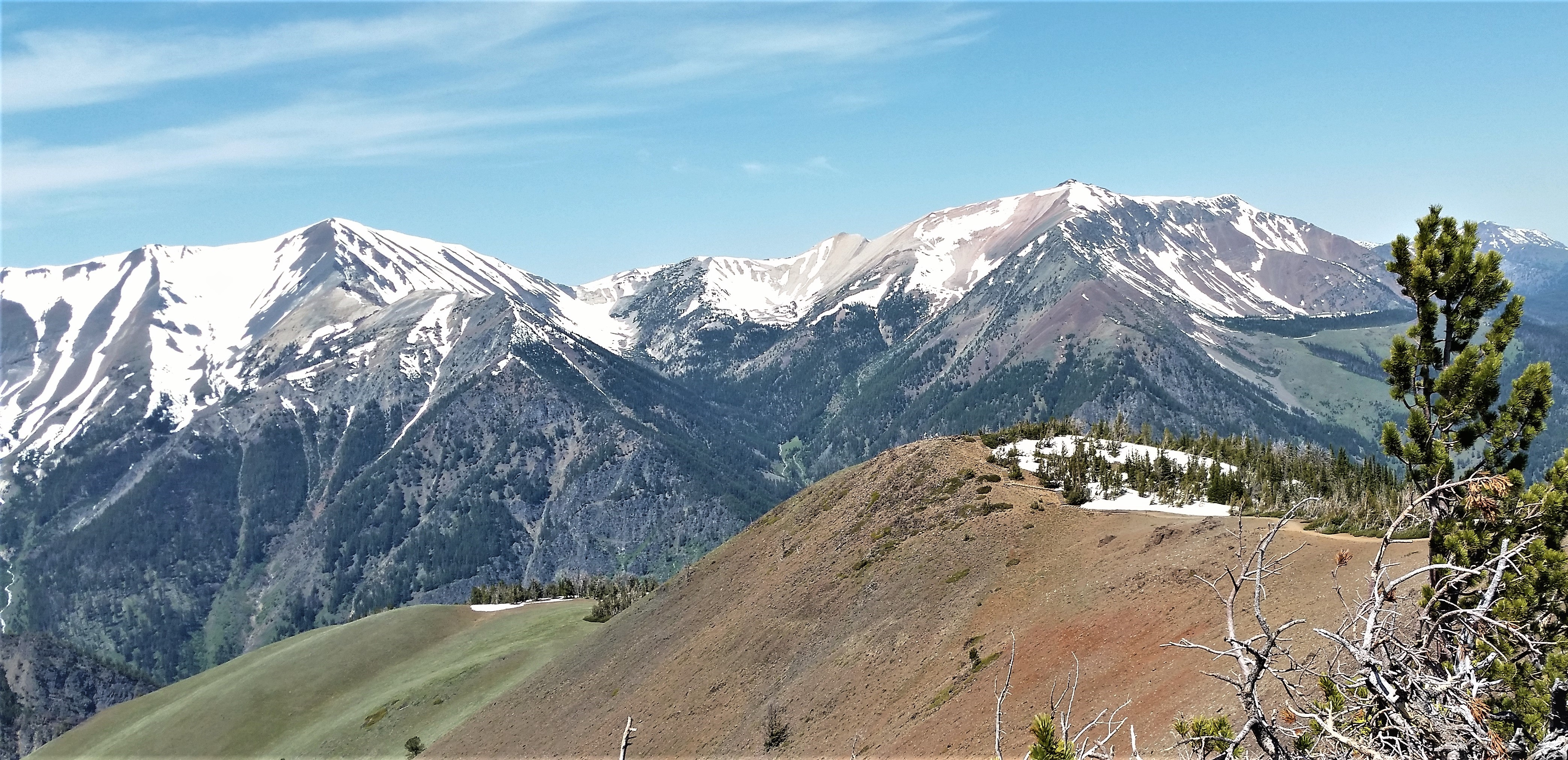
Hurwal Divide (left) and Chief Joseph Mountain (right) from Mt. Howard

== See also ==
- List of mountain peaks of Oregon
