= Wallowa Lake =

Lake of Oregon, United States

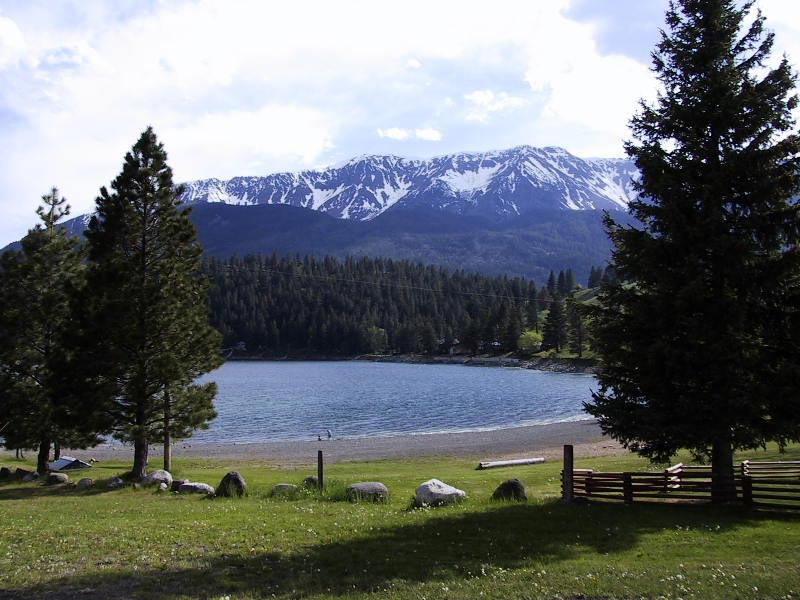
- Wallowa Lake with Chief Joseph Mountain of the Wallowa Mountains in the background

- Location within Oregon Location within the United States
- Location: Wallowa County, Oregon
- Coordinates: 45°18′32″N 117°12′38″W
- Type: Natural, oligotrophic, with dam
- Primary inflows: Wallowa River
- Primary outflows: Wallowa River
- Catchment area: 51 square miles (130 km^{2})
- Basin countries: United States
- Max. length: 3.5 miles (5.6 km)
- Max. width: 0.75 miles (1.21 km)
- Surface area: 1,508 acres (610 ha)
- Average depth: 161 feet (49 m)
- Max. depth: 299 feet (91 m)
- Water volume: 243,500 acre-feet (300,400,000 m^{3})
- Residence time: 2.5 years
- Shore length^{1}: 8.2 miles (13.2 km)
- Surface elevation: 4,372 ft (1,333 m)
- Settlements: Joseph
- ^{1} Shore length is not a well-defined measure.

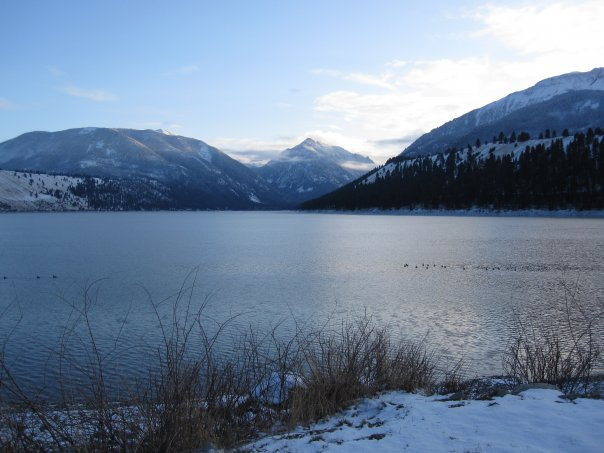
The north end of Wallowa Lake in December.

Wallowa Lake is a ribbon lake 1 mile (1.6 km) south of Joseph, Oregon, United States, at an elevation of 4,372 ft (1,333 m). Impounded by high moraines, it was formed by a series of Pleistocene glaciers. On the south end of the lake is a small community made up of vacation homes, lodging, restaurants, as well as other small businesses. Wallowa Lake has been used for recreation since at least 1880. The Wallowa Lake State Park is at the southern tip of the lake.

== Geology and formation ==
Wallowa Lake has been used in geology textbooks as an example of a lake dammed by moraines. These moraines begin well below the water's surface and climb to over 900 ft (270 m) above the lake. Before the glacial unit compounded enough to form the moraines that currently surround the lake, a large alluvial fan was present in the valley. This fan was created by the Wallowa River transporting debris into the valley. The sediment left by the river was pushed by a series of glaciers that advanced north into the valley. As they pushed the debris, they also dug deep into the earth. Though the number of glaciers that formed the moraines is debated, the most accepted hypothesis is that eight or nine glaciers formed the walls that now dam the lake. The last glacier advanced into the valley about 17,000 years ago and is known as the Wallowa Glacier. Its moraines form much of the lake shore. Near Glacier Lake, high in the surrounding mountains, is evidence of several subsequent glacier advances. Occurring subsequent to the formation of Wallowa Lake, these did not reach the location of the lake. The earliest of these was 11,000–10,000 years before present.

== History ==
=== Gold rush and war with the Nez Perce ===
The Wallowa Lake area was inhabited by the Wallowa band of the Nez Perce tribe prior to the exploration of the area and the formation of the U.S. State of Oregon. The lake and its surrounding area was guaranteed to the Nez Perce as part of the Treaty of 1855. This lasted until the discovery of gold in the area and the subsequent rush. Conflict with miners and other trespassers resulted in new treaty negotiations in 1863, in which American agents aimed to shrink the reservation and exclude the Wallowa county from its boundaries. The Wallowa Nez Perce rejected the proposed treaty and refused to sign. However, chiefs from bands unaffected by the new boundaries, from the areas that remained within the reservation, did sign, placing the Wallowa band outside the reservation.

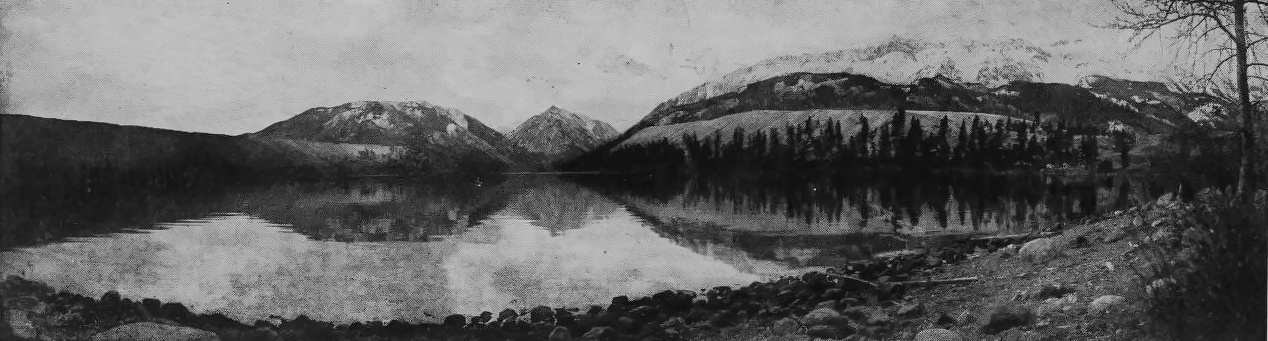
Wallowa Lake as it appeared in August 1875

By 1877, pressures from non-Indian settlers provoked violence, including the murder of Nez Perce people in the Salmon River area by settlers, and subsequent revenge carried out by some young Nez Perce warriors. Rather than submit to American notions of justice, Chief Joseph led the Wallowas away from their homeland. After the war, the U.S. Government took the land and allowed it to be settled. This led to the formation of many of the nearby towns that still exist today.

October 5, 1877, the day of the surrender, Chief Joseph gave the following speech:

I am tired of fighting. Our chiefs are killed. Looking Glass is dead. Toohulhulsote is dead. The old men are all dead. It is the young men who say yes or no. He who led the young men is dead. It is cold and we have no blankets. The little children are freezing to death. My people, some of them, have run away to the hills and have no blankets, no food. No one knows where they are, perhaps freezing to death. I want to have time to look for my children and see how many I can find. Maybe I shall find them among the dead. Hear me, my chiefs. I am tired. My heart is sick and sad. From where the sun now stands, I will fight no more, forever.

After the surrender, Chief Joseph and the Nez Perce were banished from the area. Today many monuments and dedications are set up at the lake and its surrounding cities in remembrance of the Nez Perce tribe and the battle that took place. In 1880 the town nearest to Wallowa Lake, Joseph, was named after Chief Joseph. The war is remembered by historians as one of the last wars the U.S. forces had with Native Americans.

=== Formation of Joseph and Wallowa Lake tourism ===
The first businesses near the lake were in the town of Joseph. In 1879, a man named Matthew Johnson who was the first postmaster for Joseph, ran the first store. Due to the needs of the crowds of gold miners who were flocking to the area, the store was a success and the town of Joseph began to grow. The area became so populated that Wallowa County was formed in 1887, which encompassed the lake and its surrounding cities.

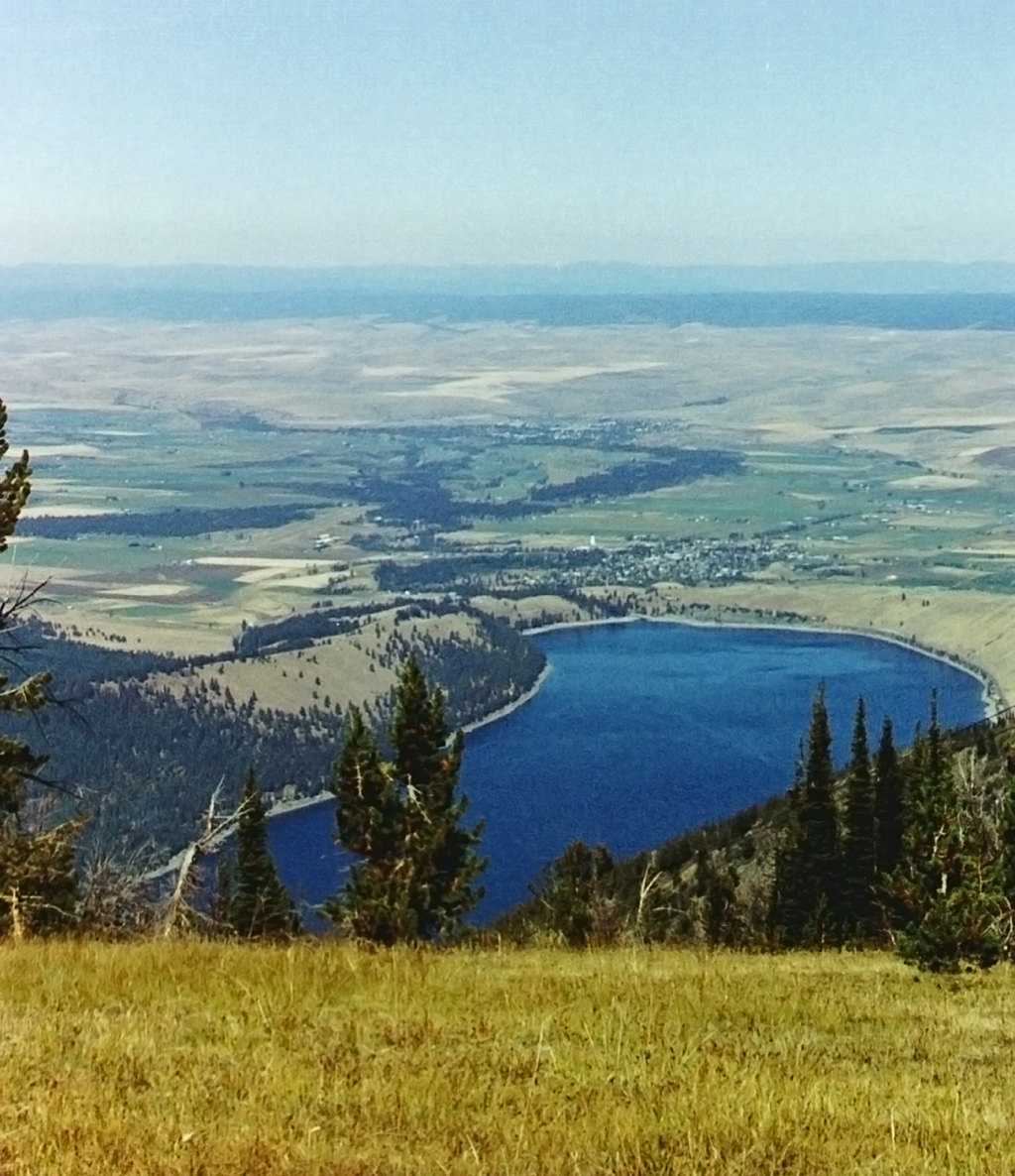
Wallowa Lake and the town of Joseph.

Wallowa Lake gained popularity among gold miners and soon began attracting guests from other areas. Seeing an emerging tourism market, entrepreneurs began building businesses at the lake. Among those built was the Wonderland Inn, now known as the Wallowa Lake Lodge. The Wonderland Inn was developed in 1923 as an amusement park at the south end of the lake. The park contained a restaurant, store, bowling alley, dance hall, outdoor movie theater, horse drawn carousel and cabins for those wishing to stay overnight. An 18-passenger boat carried the guests who arrived in Joseph (which lies at the north end of the lake) down the entire four mile stretch of Wallowa Lake, finally arriving at the inn and amusement park.

The amusement park operated until 1940, when snowfall from an unusually harsh winter crushed most of the buildings and rendered the park inoperable. However, the inn survived the winter and still remains in operation, though renamed the Wallowa Lake Lodge. The area at the south end of the lake continued to be developed commercially. Several more stores, lodges, restaurants, and rental cabins were built in the following years, turning the south end of the lake into a tourist community.

The businesses at the south end of Wallowa Lake are members of a non-profit tourism association. This association maintains a website, supports tourism in the area and works to solve issues across the lake community.

There are 2,000 to 3,000 people residing at the south end of Wallowa Lake in summer with all businesses open. However, from October through March there are less than 40 year-round residences at the south end of the lake, which is designated as a CDP by the U.S. Census Bureau, and only a few lodging businesses remain open.

== Dam ==
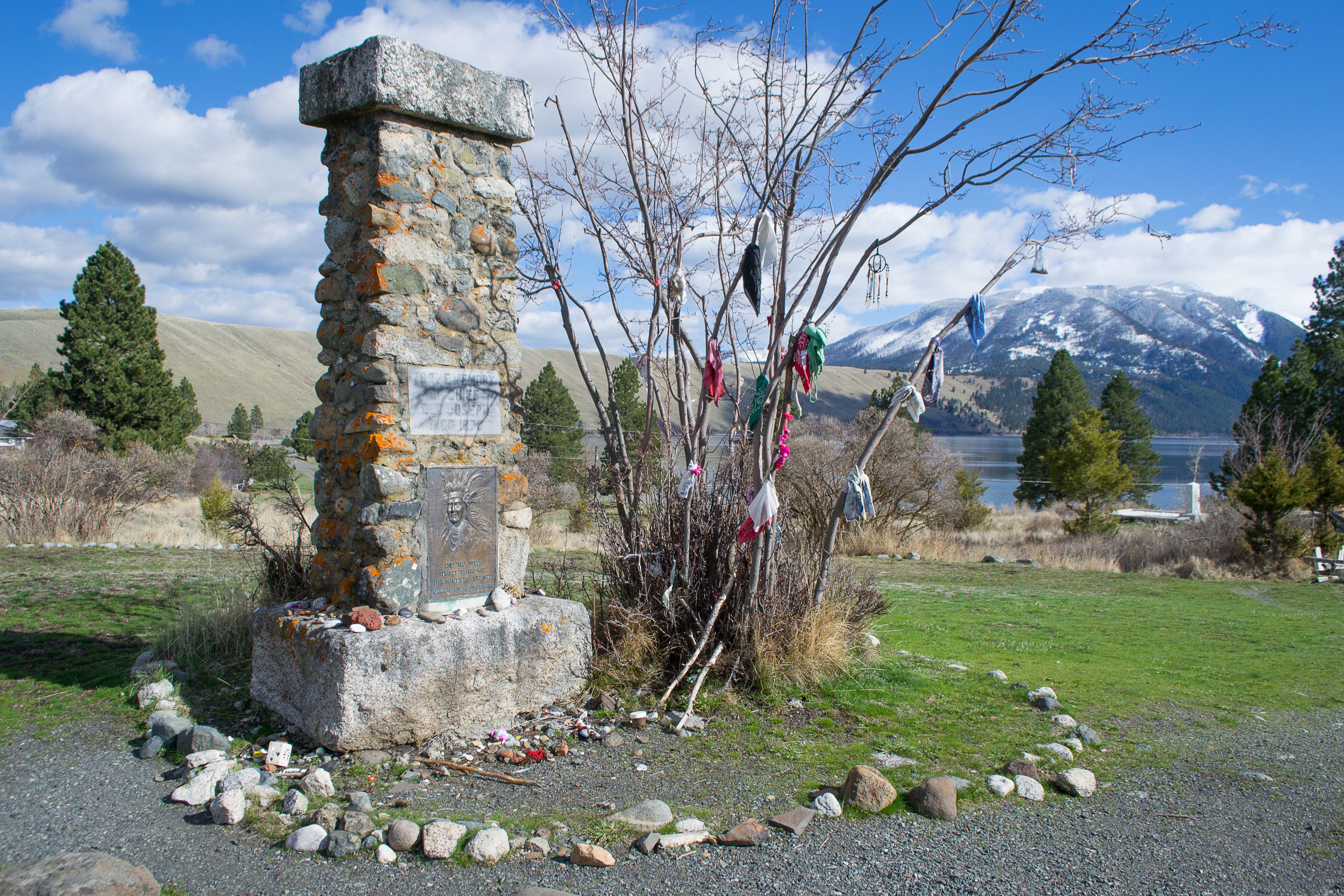
A memorial to Nez Perce Chief Joseph overlooking the lake.

The lake's natural outlet to the north, closest to the town of Joseph, was the site of a private dam constructed in 1918 for irrigation, and raised to a 35-foot (11 m)-high concrete gravity dam in 1929. No hydroelectric power is generated. It is owned and operated by a non-profit of local irrigation consumers, Associated Ditch Companies of Joseph.

In 1996, the United States Bureau of Reclamation and the Oregon Water Resources Department identified deficiencies in the safety of the aging "high hazard" structure. In 2006, state and federal money was appropriated for rehabilitation and a reconstruction which may allow a migrating fish passage, specifically for re-introduced coho and sockeye salmon.

== Tramway ==
Located near the lake is an aerial cable gondola lift. It runs from the bottom of the valley to the top of Mount Howard, which is measured at 8,261 ft (2,518 m). It was built in 1968 and opened to the public in 1970. From the tram car, passengers can view Wallowa Lake as well as the surrounding mountains. In June 1992, a malfunction occurred in the operating system of the Tram and all passengers had to be evacuated by helicopter. There were no injuries and the incident serves as the only such problem that has occurred on the Tramway.

== See also ==
- List of lakes in Oregon

== Gallery ==
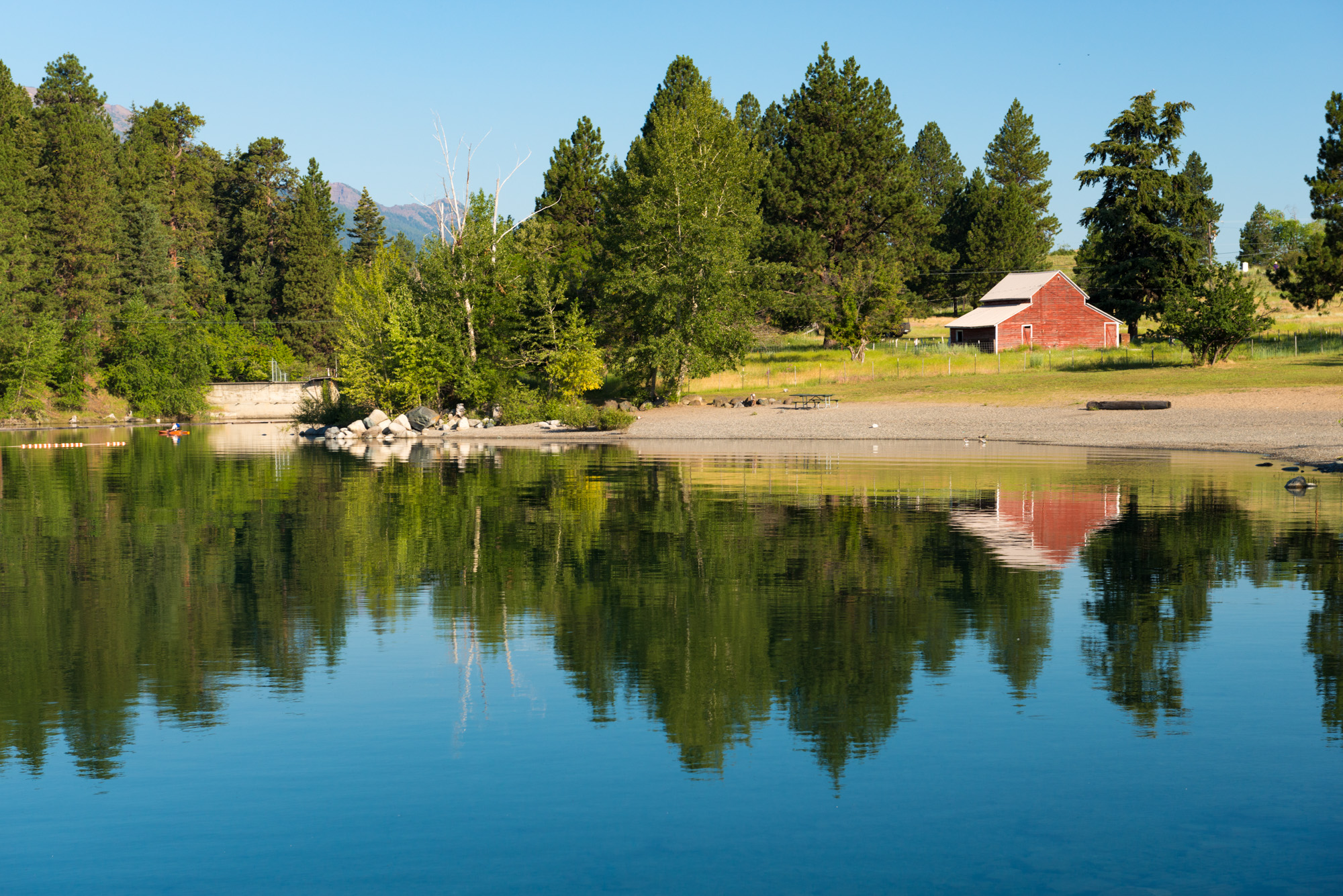
Dam and barn at north end of lake

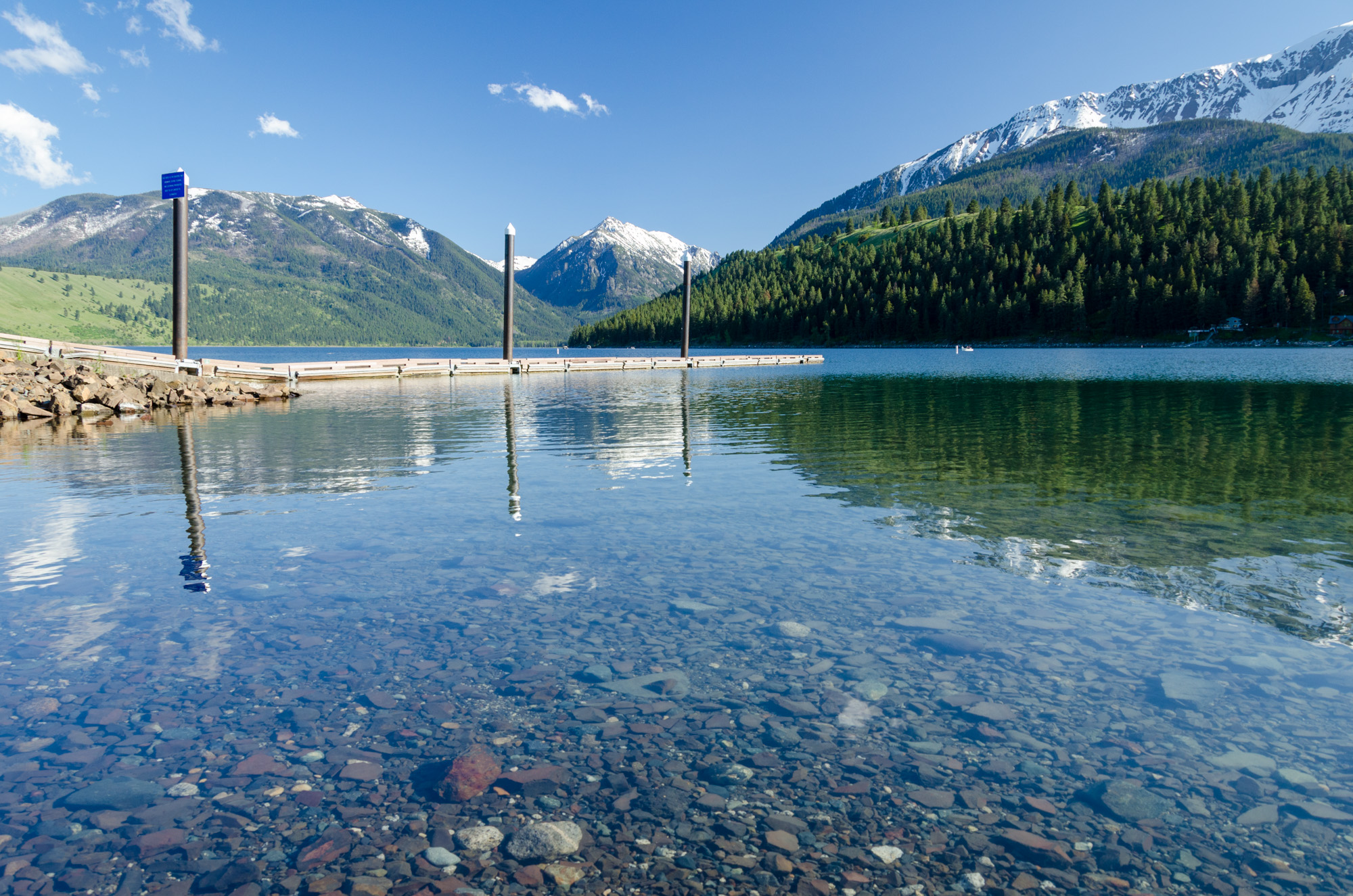
North end of lake. Public dock visible in midground, Bonneville Mountain at center and Chief Joseph Mountain at right

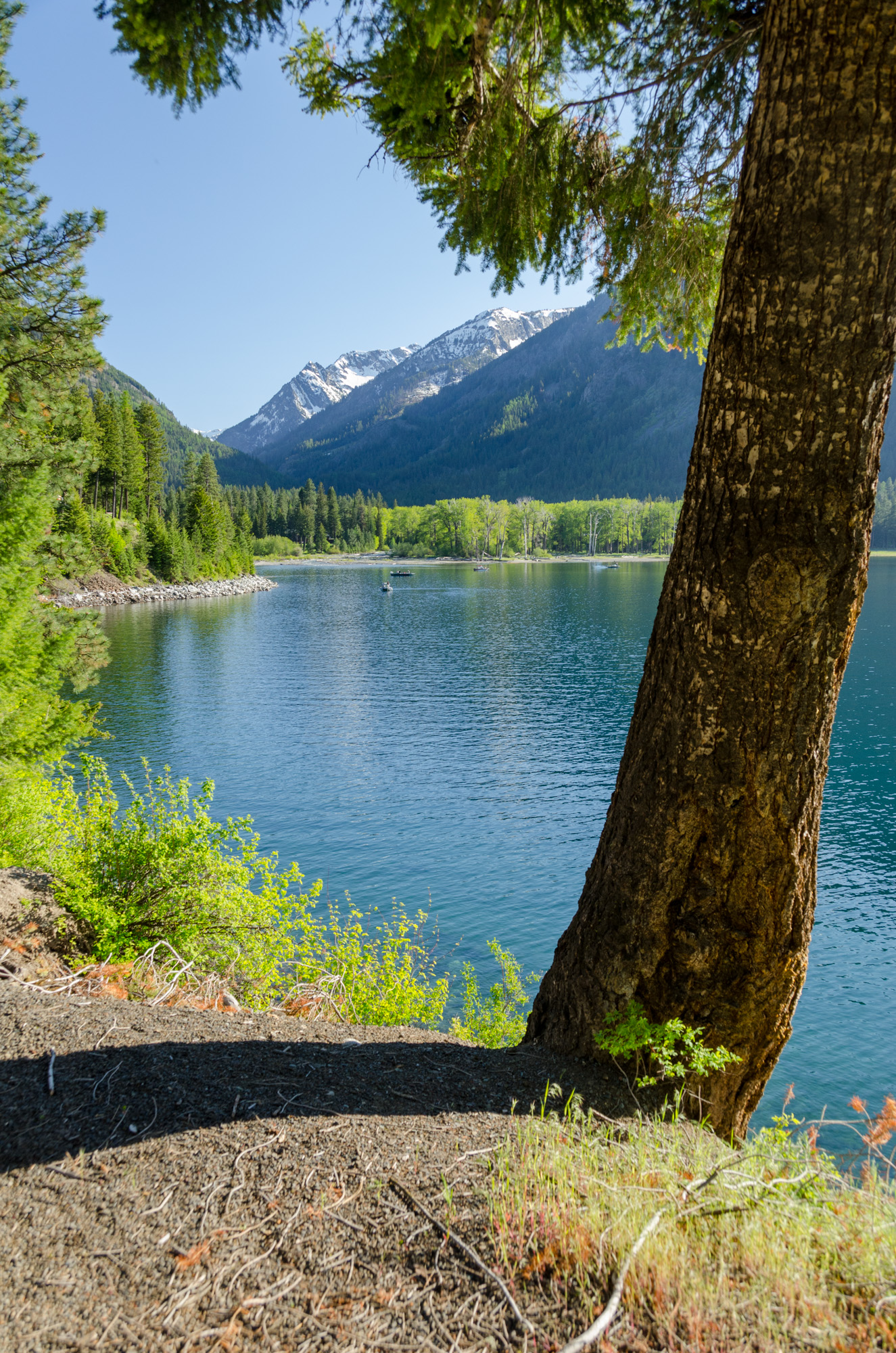
Southeast end of Wallowa Lake
