= Wallowa Mountains =

Mountain range in Oregon, United States

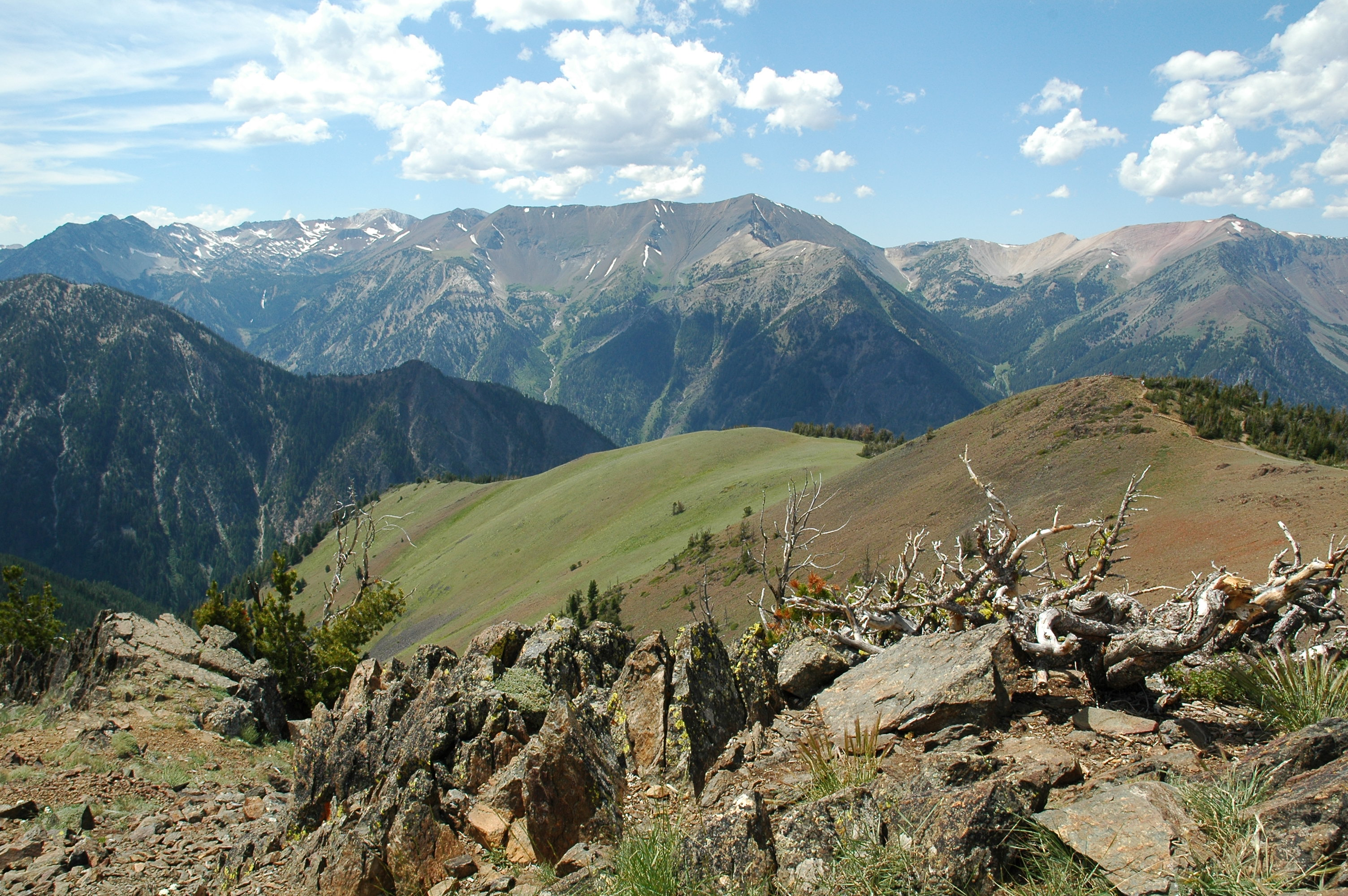
- The Wallowas from Mount Howard. Hurwal Divide is centered at the top, and Sacajawea Peak is behind to the left. Chief Joseph Mountain is on the far right.

Highest point
- Peak: Sacajawea Peak, Eagle Cap Wilderness, Wallowa County
- Elevation: 9,838 ft (2,999 m)
- Coordinates: 45°14′42″N 117°17′33″W

Dimensions
- Length: 40 mi (64 km) NW–SE

Geography
- Country: United States
- State: Oregon
- Counties: Wallowa; Union
- Range coordinates: 45°12′00″N 117°19′04″W

The Wallowa Mountains (/wəˈlaʊwə/) are a mountain range located in the Columbia Plateau of northeastern Oregon in the United States. The range runs approximately 40 miles (64 km) northwest to southeast in southwestern Wallowa County and eastern Union County between the Blue Mountains to the west and the Snake River to the east. The range is sometimes considered to be an eastern spur of the Blue Mountains, and it is known as the "Alps of Oregon". Much of the range is designated as the Eagle Cap Wilderness, part of the Wallowa–Whitman National Forest.

== Geography ==
The range is drained by the Wallowa River, which flows from the north side of the mountains, and its tributary the Minam River, which flows through the west side of the range. The Imnaha River flows from the east side of the range.

The highest point in the range is Sacajawea Peak, which is 9,838 feet (2,999 m) above sea level. Sacajawea is the sixth highest mountain in Oregon and the state's highest peak outside of the Cascade Range.

== Geology ==
Many geologists believe that the Wallowa Mountains in northeastern Oregon are a displaced fragment of the Insular Belt. The core of the Wallowas is composed of the Wallowa Batholith surrounded by Columbia River basalt. In addition there are many older terranes between the batholith and basalt flows.

The Wallowa Batholith is formed of granite from a magma upwelling in Late Jurassic and Early Cretaceous time (between 160 million and 120 million years ago). The placement of this rock caused uplift of the surface, which at the time was tropical sea. This is evident from the slate, quartzite, and marble present in the mountains, which come from metamorphism of the sedimentary deposits of oceans during the Triassic. At the center of the Batholith are granodioritic rocks, while the outer limits of the range are tonalitic. The granite batholith is cut by dikes; however, these are uncommon.

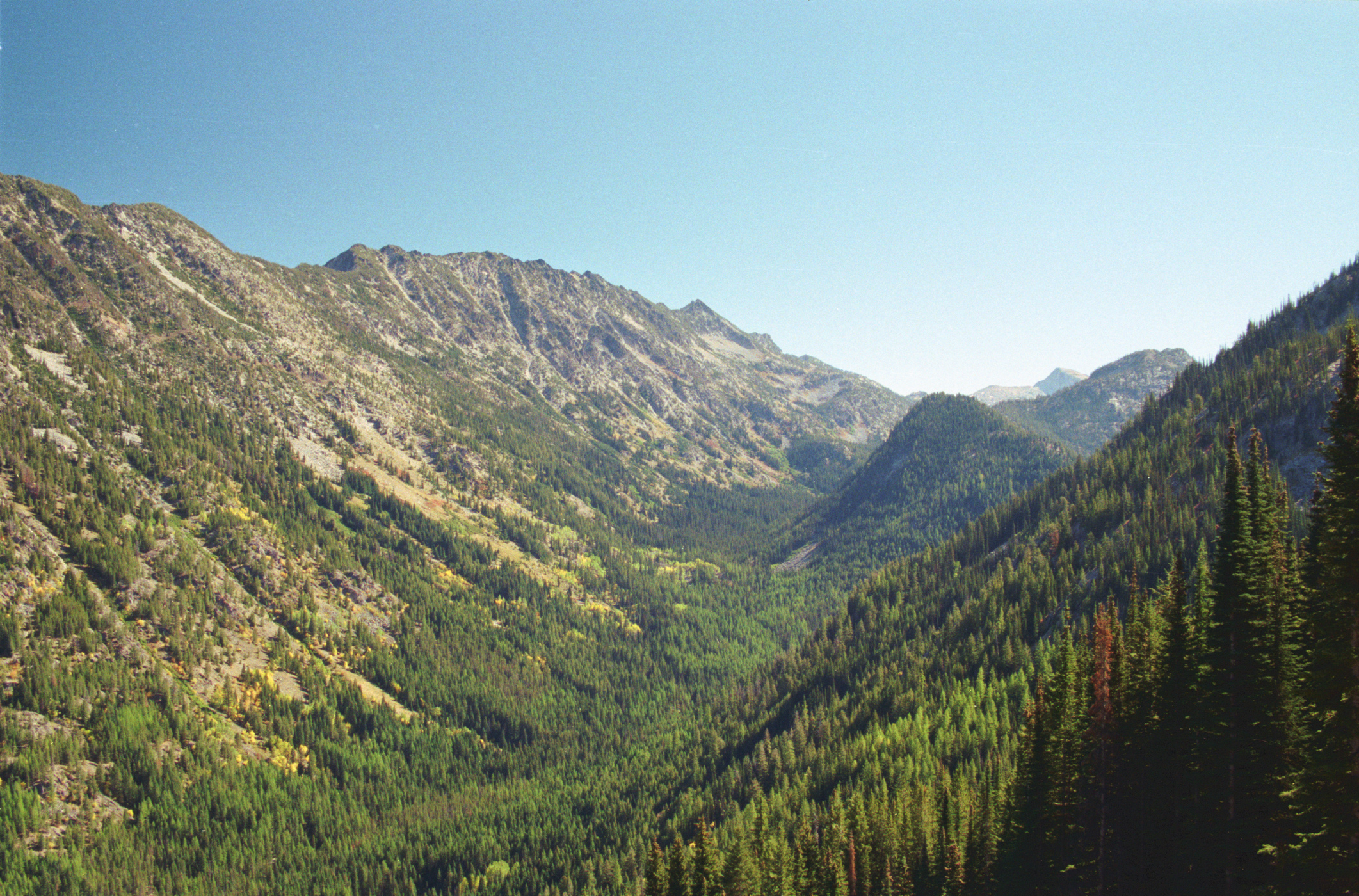
The valley of the Lostine River in the mountains

Glaciers carved out the valleys during the late Pleistocene, which left a number of moraines. The series of moraines is formed by a series of glacial advances and retreats. Glacial till is also a common feature of the valleys. The melting of the glaciers produced a large quantity of water, which carried sediment to the valley bottoms, leaving delta deposits on top of the former deposits.

== Climate ==
In the mountains, much precipitation falls as snow. Total snowfall peaks around March. Most precipitation in the area is orographic precipitation. Near the tops of the mountains, total annual precipitation can exceed 100 inches (250 cm) per year, while in the valleys it can be as low as 10 inches (250 mm).

=== Avalanches ===
The Wallowa Mountains are a popular destination for backcountry skiers and snowmobilers. However, avalanches are a consistent threat to backcountry skiers and snowmobilers.

In February 2014, two backcountry skiers were killed and two others were seriously injured in the southern Wallowas on Cornucopia Peak when an avalanche swept into a mountainside gully. On March 8, 2016, the local avalanche center director, Kip Rand, was killed backcountry skiing near the Hurwal Divide and Chief Joseph Mountain in an avalanche following the collapse of a large cornice.

== Ecology ==
The higher precipitation of the mountains compared with the surrounding country has created a mesic habitat in the Wallowas. Vegetation in the region contains combinations of plants found in both the Rocky Mountains and the Cascades. At low elevations, Douglas fir is the most common tree for slopes, whereas Engelmann spruce and lodgepole pine occur in valley bottoms, with grand fir common below 5,300 feet (1,600 m). In meadows and around springs and seeps, willows and sedge grow. Above 7,000 feet (2,100 m), subalpine fir is dominant, and whitebark pine is often found on ridges and south-facing slopes.

== Human history ==
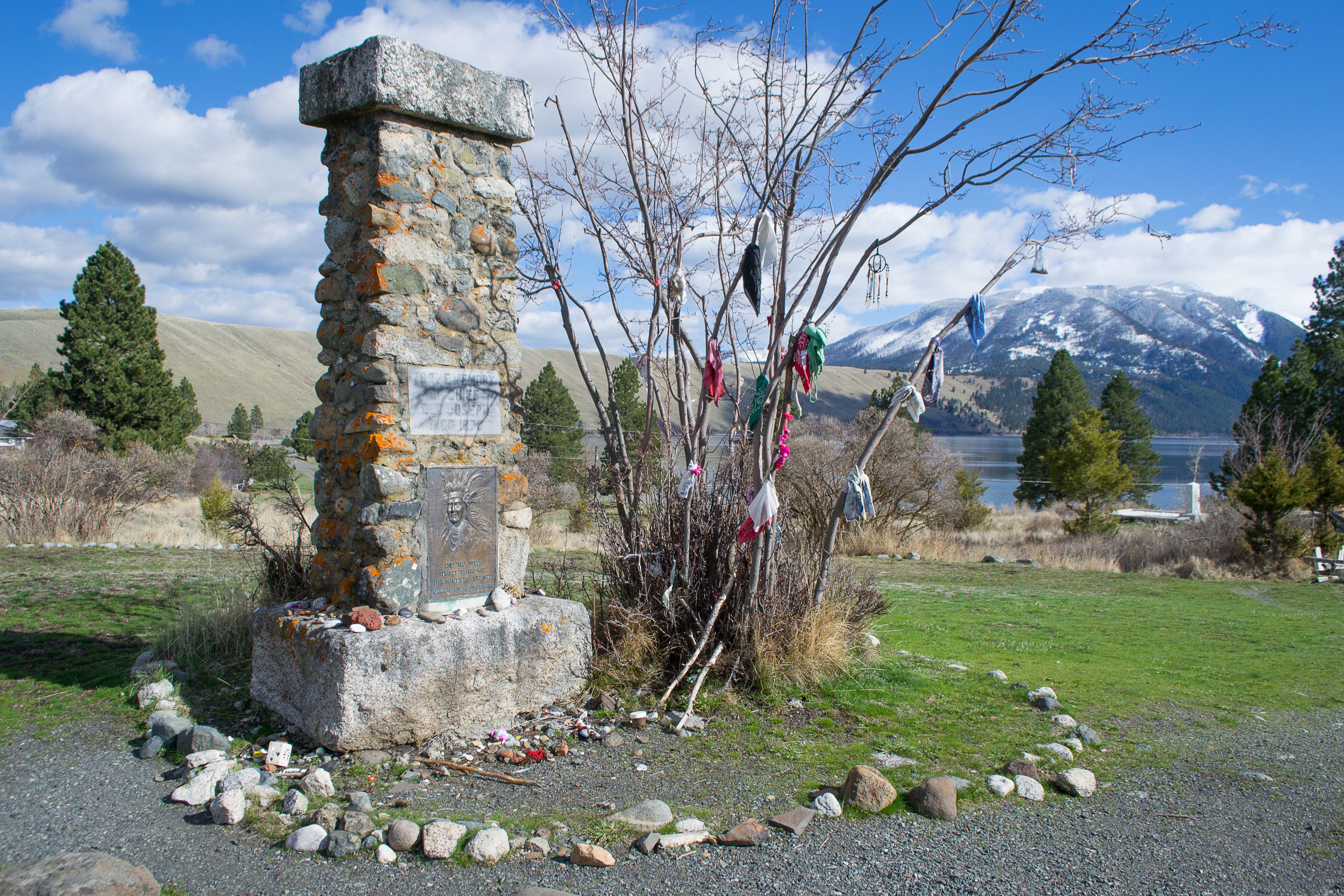
Gravesite of Chief Joseph

The area was home to the Wallowa band of the Lower Nez Perce. The Nez Perce lived in the canyons and burned trees to create meadows for the horses that they obtained around 1730. In 1834, Captain Bonneville crossed through the mountains and met with the lower Nez Perce on his way to Fort Walla Walla. In the 1840s, people began to move west, bringing settlers through the land. The Nez Perce began to trade with these settlers. A settlement in the mountains was built in 1861. In 1863, a new treaty was signed that relinquished lands that granted by an 1855 treaty, turning them over to the American government. This same year, the settlers in the mountains moved to present-day La Grande. These lands included the Wallowa Valley, home of Chief Joseph. The government first opened the Wallowa Valley to settlement in 1867. Surveyors began to come through and would continue until 1869. The Wallowa Valley was partitioned in 1873, with one half for the Nez Perce and the other for settlers. Two years later, in 1875, the government banned the Nez Perce from the valley. The first road into the valley, a toll road, was constructed the same year. The U.S. Government attempted to force the removal of the Nez Perce in 1877; however, this angered the natives, who chose instead to raid the settlers, leading to the Nez Perce War.

Logging came in the late 1880s, using streams and rivers to transport the wood. A dam was constructed on Wallowa Lake in 1884 to help irrigate the valley. In 1908, the first railroad into the valley was completed. Rail lines were built to the upper valley by the Union Pacific Railroad in 1919, allowing for safer transportation of logs. The dam beneath Wallowa Lake was replaced by a concrete dam in 1916, and a new dam was completed in 1929.
