= Matterhorn (disambiguation) =

The Matterhorn is a mountain of the Alps.

Matterhorn may also refer to:

== Mountains ==
=== Canada ===
- Matterhorn Peak (British Columbia), near the town of Bella Coola
- Matterhorn Peak, the highest summit of the Dunn Peak massif near Clearwater, British Columbia

=== United States ===
- Matterhorn (Nevada)
- Matterhorn (Oregon)
- Matterhorn Peak, California
- Matterhorn Peak (Colorado)
- Little Matterhorn (Montana)

=== Elsewhere ===
- Gaurjunda, commonly known as Dhauladhar Matterhorn, in the Dhauladhar range of the Himalayas
- Matterhorn (Antarctica)
- Neny Matterhorn, Antarctica
- Klein Matterhorn (or Little Matterhorn), in the vicinity of the Matterhorn
- Little Matterhorn (Heard Island), Australian external territory

== Other places ==
- Matterhorn Museum, in Zermatt
- Matterhorn Glacier
- Matterhorn Glacier (Antarctica)

== Art, entertainment and media ==
- Matterhorn (album), a 2017 album by Heaters
- Matterhorn (film), a 2013 Dutch film
- Matterhorn: A Novel of the Vietnam War, a 2010 novel by Karl Marlantes

=== Rides ===
- Matterhorn (ride), an amusement ride
- Matterhorn Bobsleds, a Disneyland attraction

== Other uses ==
- Tony Matterhorn (born 1972), Jamaican dancehall deejay and selector
- Opencast Matterhorn, music software
- Operation Matterhorn, a military operations plan of the US Army Air Forces in World War II
- Project Matterhorn, a secret project in the 1950s to create nuclear fusion power
- Matterhorn, a tapped horn subwoofer
- Reichmuth Matterhorn, a hedge fund

== See also ==
- List of references to the Matterhorn
