= Heated =

Heated may refer to:

- Heated (Big Sugar album), a 1998 rock album
- Heated (Sean T album), a 2000 hip hop album
- "Heated" (Beyoncé song), a song by Beyoncé from Renaissance, 2022

== See also ==
- Heat (disambiguation)
- Heater (disambiguation)
