= Mo Pop Festival =

Music Festival in Detroit, Michigan, United States

- Genre: Indie rock, pop, and hip hop
- Dates: 2-day weekend in July
- Locations: West Riverfront Park; Detroit, Michigan
- Years active: 2013–19, 2022
- Attendance: 7,500–20,000
- Website: mopopfestival.com

The Mo Pop Festival was a music festival in Detroit. The festival featured both emerging as well as established musicians, and its ambiance has been described as "boutique and niche". It showcased indie-rock, pop, and hip-hop music along with local Detroit cuisine and beverages, in addition to endeavoring to bring visitors to the city's riverfront. Though smaller in size, Mo Pop had been compared to other musical festivals such as Bonnaroo, Coachella, Lollapalooza, and Pitchfork. It had also drawn comparisons to other festivals held in the city, namely the Detroit Jazz Festival and Movement Electronic Music Festival.

No event was held in 2020 or 2021 due to the COVID-19 pandemic; the 8th edition of the fest was deferred to 2022. In February 2023, festival organizers announced a "hiatus from the annual outdoor festival model", pivoting to the name "Mo Pop Presents" and focusing on highlighting concert events in the Metro Detroit area.

== History ==
=== Freedom Hill Amphitheatre in Sterling Heights (2013–2014) ===
The inaugural 2013 Mo Pop Festival was held on a single day at the Freedom Hill Amphitheatre in suburban Sterling Heights. It featured performances by Andrew Bird, Capital Cities, Jamaican Queens, JR JR, Manchester Orchestra, The Mowgli's, Old Crow Medicine Show, Edward Sharpe and the Magnetic Zeros, Walk off the Earth, and Wild Belle. The 2014 festival, also held at Freedom Hill, staggered set times to allow attendees to watch all musical acts, and it featured performances by City and Colour, Cold War Kids, Flint Eastwood, J Roddy Walston and the Business, Lord Huron, Tokyo Police Club, and Young the Giant. Both the 2013 and 2014 festivals were attended by approximately 7,500 people. After the 2014 festival, Mo Pop looked to move to Detroit due to both its location and to enable further growth, according to festival co-producer Jason Rogalewski.

=== West Riverfront Park in Detroit (2015–19, 2021–) ===
==== 2015 ====
The 2015 Mo Pop Festival was the first to be held at West Riverfront Park in Detroit, just west of Downtown, and also the first two-day festival. Held on July 25–26, it was headlined by Modest Mouse and Passion Pit, and also featured performances by Atlas Genius, James Bay, Chromeo, Brandon Flowers, Jessica Hernandez & the Deltas, Iron & Wine, King Tuff, and Viet Cong. West Riverfront Park is a 20-acre (8.1 ha) park on the Detroit River with views of the downtown skyline and the Ambassador Bridge, and it was created in 2014 by Detroit's Riverfront Conservancy on the site of a former Detroit Free Press printing facility. Described as "free-spirited" and "whimsically themed", Mo Pop's 2015 iteration once again featured two stages aligned so that attendees could watch both without physically moving, and alternated time slots between so they would not have to choose between acts performing simultaneously. In addition to music, the 2015 festival also included artisans and craft makers, visual artists, craft beer, food trucks, and even a Mo Tech village "showcasing work from local start-ups and inventors". During the festival, heavy rainfall overwhelmed the park's drainage capabilities and formed a standing body of water nicknamed "Lake Mo Pop". Mo Pop's 2015 total two-day attendance was estimated to be over 15,000.

==== 2016 ====
The 2016 Mo Pop Festival, held on July 23–24 at West Riverfront Park for the second year, was headlined by Børns, G-Eazy, Haim, The Head and the Heart, and M83. It also featured performances by Coast Modern, Mac DeMarco, Glass Animals, Matt and Kim, Father John Misty, and Panama Wedding. It drew an attendance of over 20,000 people over its two days. New for 2016 was a tented arcade and games area, and a "craft village" vendor area.

==== 2017 ====
The 2017 Mo Pop Festival, held on July 29–30 at West Riverfront Park, was headlined by Alt-J, Foster the People, Run the Jewels, and Solange. Other acts included Vance Joy, Middle Kids, Grace Mitchell, Phantogram, PUP, PVRIS, Tyler, the Creator, and Wavves. Both days of the festival started with back-to-back Michigan artists, including Stef Chura and Heaters. In total, the 2017 iteration of Mo Pop featured over nine hours of music with musicians on two different stages. It also included a dozen local food trucks and the Shipyard, a food and beverage court that was presented by Corktown's cocktail bar Sugar House and featured barbecue from Slows Bar BQ, hot dogs and tacos from Ferndale's Imperial restaurant, craft beers from Birmingham's Griffin Claw Brewing Company, and adult ciders from Blake's Hard Cider Company of Armada.

==== 2018 ====
The 2018 Mo Pop Festival, which was held on July 28–29, was headlined by Bon Iver, The National, Portugal. The Man, and St. Vincent. It was the fourth straight festival at West Riverfront Park. Also performing were Billie Eilish, Brockhampton, Highly Suspect, Vince Staples, and the Detroit-based band Joe Hertler & The Rainbow Seekers.
