= Sacajawea Peak (Oregon) =

Mountain in Oregon, United States

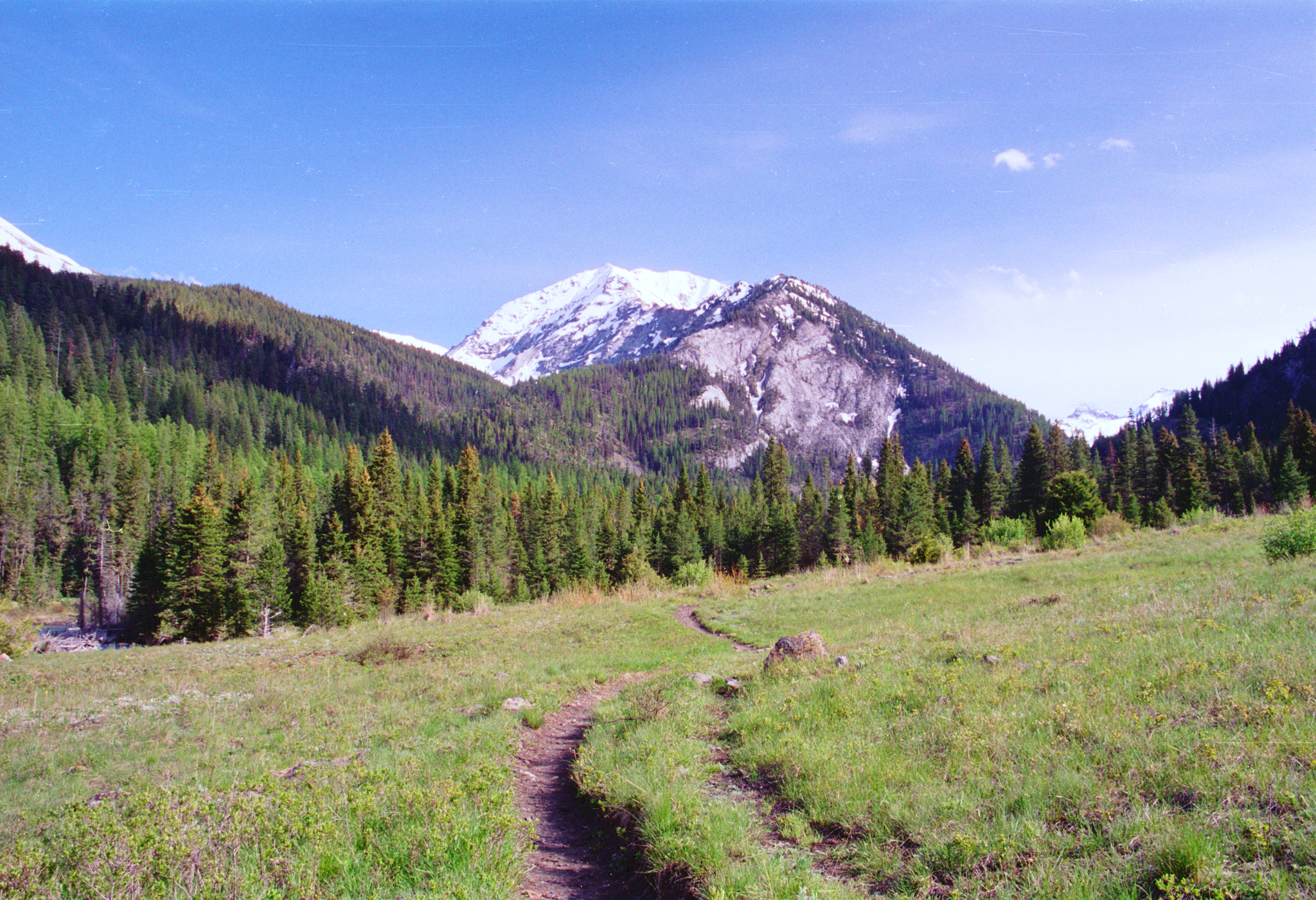
- North aspect of Sacajawea Peak

Highest point
- Elevation: 9,843 ft (3,000 m)
- Prominence: 6,388 ft (1,947 m)
- Parent peak: Eagle Peak (California)
- Listing: North America isolated peaks 104th; US most prominent peaks 47th; Oregon county high points
- Coordinates: 45°14′42″N 117°17′33″W

Geography
- Location within Oregon Location within the United States
- Location: Wallowa County, Oregon, U.S.
- Parent range: Wallowa Mountains

Sacajawea Peak is a 9,843-foot (3,000 m) peak in the Wallowa Mountains, in the U.S. state of Oregon. It is in the Eagle Cap Wilderness and the Wallowa–Whitman National Forest.

== Description ==
Sacajawea Peak is the highest point in the Wallowa Mountains, and the 6th highest peak in Oregon. Matterhorn, another peak in the Wallowa Mountains, is about the same height at Sacajawea Peak, and some sources claim it is actually slightly higher.

Sacajawea's prominence of 6,377 feet (1,944 m), makes it one of the most topographically prominent peaks in the United States. It is ranked 18th among peaks in the 48 contiguous states. It is the 2nd most prominent peak in Oregon, after Mount Hood.

The nearest peak higher than Sacajawea is Pinyon Peak, in the Rocky Mountains of Idaho, 126 mi (203 km) to the east. This makes Sacajawea Peak the 25th most topographically isolated peak of the United States.

Sacajawea Peak is the highest summit in the Eagle Cap Wilderness and the Wallowa–Whitman National Forest. It is just northwest of Hurwal Divide, 1 mile (1.6 km) north of Matterhorn, 1.4 miles (2.3 km) northwest of Ice Lake, and 8 miles (13 km) south of Joseph.

Sacajawea Peak is connected by high ridges to Matterhorn. Both are connected to Hurwal Divide, a high ridge extending east and north from Sacajawea and Matterhorn. A high pass connects Hurwal Divide to Chief Joseph Mountain, to the north. These mountains and high ridges form a unit separated from the rest of the Wallowas by river valleys, with the West Fork Wallowa River flows north along the east edge and Hurricane Creek along the west. Numerous tributaries flow from the high mountains to these rivers. Sacajawea Peak is closer to Hurricane Creek, and several tributary streams rise on the slopes of Sacajawea, such as Thorp Creek. To the west of Sacajawea Peak, across the valley of Hurricane Creek, is the high ridge of Hurricane Divide, which separates Hurricane Creek from Lostine River. South of the Sacajawea and Matterhorn high lands is Lake Basin, in which the Lostine River, West Fork Wallowa River, and Hurricane Creek originate among many small lakes. To the north and east of Sacajawea Peak and Chief Joseph Mountain the Wallowa Mountains come to an end at Wallowa Lake, just south of the town of Joseph. A road runs south from Joseph along the east side of Wallowa Lake and into the valley of the Wallowa River. A number of recreation opportunities are located there, south of Wallowa Lake, including Wallowa Lake State Park and the Wallowa Lake Tramway on Mount Howard.

== Climate ==
Climate data for Sacajawea Peak 45.2435 N, 117.2904 W, Elevation: 9,222 ft (2,811 m) (1991–2020 normals)
Month	Jan	Feb	Mar	Apr	May	Jun	Jul	Aug	Sep	Oct	Nov	Dec	Year
Mean daily maximum °F (°C)	26.2 (−3.2)	26.2 (−3.2)	29.8 (−1.2)	34.1 (1.2)	42.8 (6.0)	50.4 (10.2)	62.3 (16.8)	62.4 (16.9)	54.4 (12.4)	41.8 (5.4)	30.4 (−0.9)	24.8 (−4.0)	40.5 (4.7)
Daily mean °F (°C)	18.9 (−7.3)	17.9 (−7.8)	20.3 (−6.5)	23.9 (−4.5)	32.1 (0.1)	39.0 (3.9)	49.2 (9.6)	49.4 (9.7)	42.3 (5.7)	31.9 (−0.1)	22.9 (−5.1)	17.8 (−7.9)	30.5 (−0.9)
Mean daily minimum °F (°C)	11.7 (−11.3)	9.5 (−12.5)	10.8 (−11.8)	13.7 (−10.2)	21.4 (−5.9)	27.6 (−2.4)	36.2 (2.3)	36.5 (2.5)	30.2 (−1.0)	22.0 (−5.6)	15.5 (−9.2)	10.8 (−11.8)	20.5 (−6.4)
Average precipitation inches (mm)	8.90 (226)	7.44 (189)	8.24 (209)	6.69 (170)	5.12 (130)	3.70 (94)	1.17 (30)	0.94 (24)	1.73 (44)	4.73 (120)	7.96 (202)	9.87 (251)	66.49 (1,689)
Source: PRISM Climate Group

== History ==
Sacajawea Peak is named for Sacagawea, the Shoshone woman who traveled with the Lewis and Clark Expedition. A proposal to change the name Sacajawea Peak to Sacagawea Peak was submitted in February 1998. In December 1999, the proposal was rejected by the United States Board on Geographic Names.

== See also ==
- List of Ultras of the United States

== Gallery ==
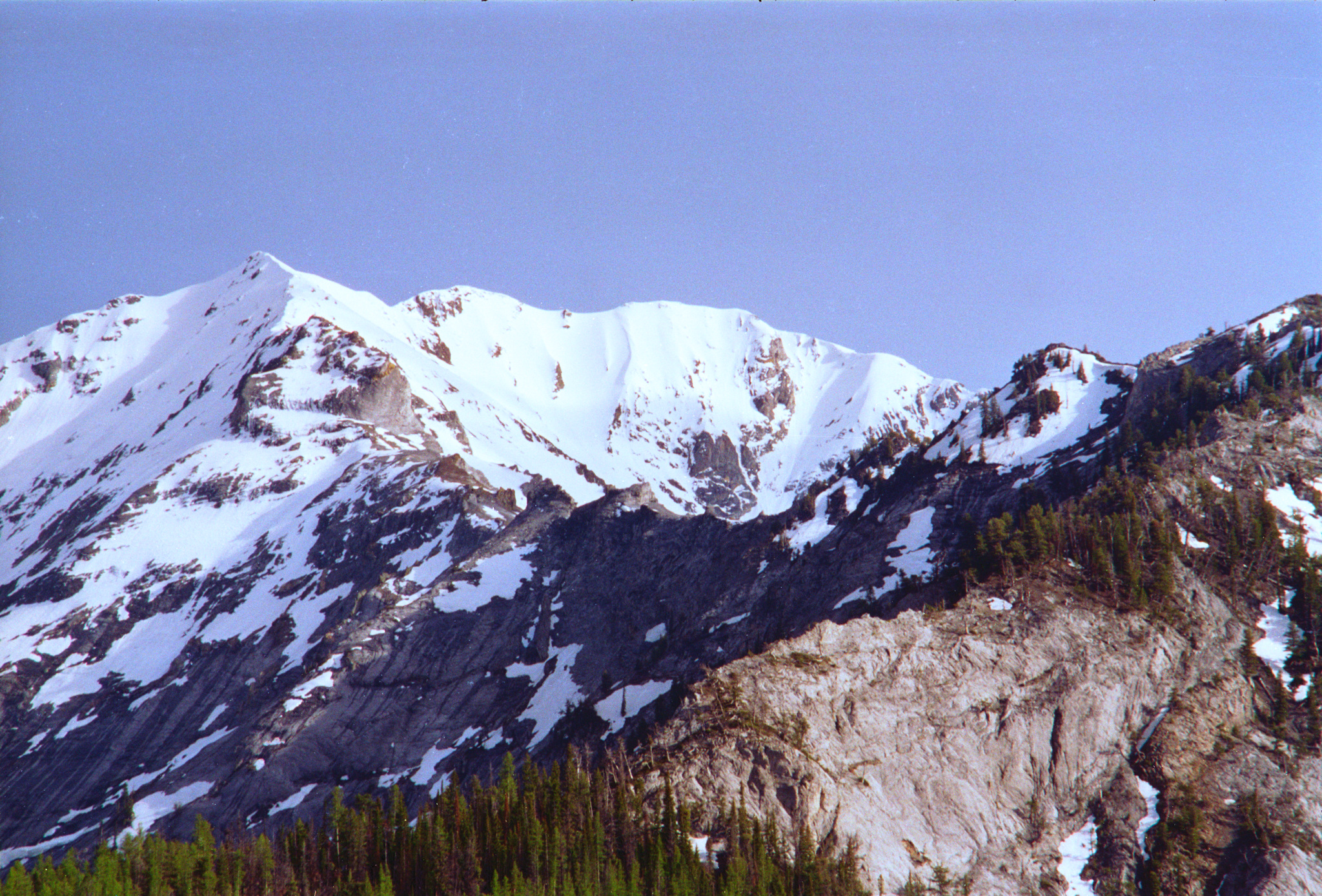
North aspect

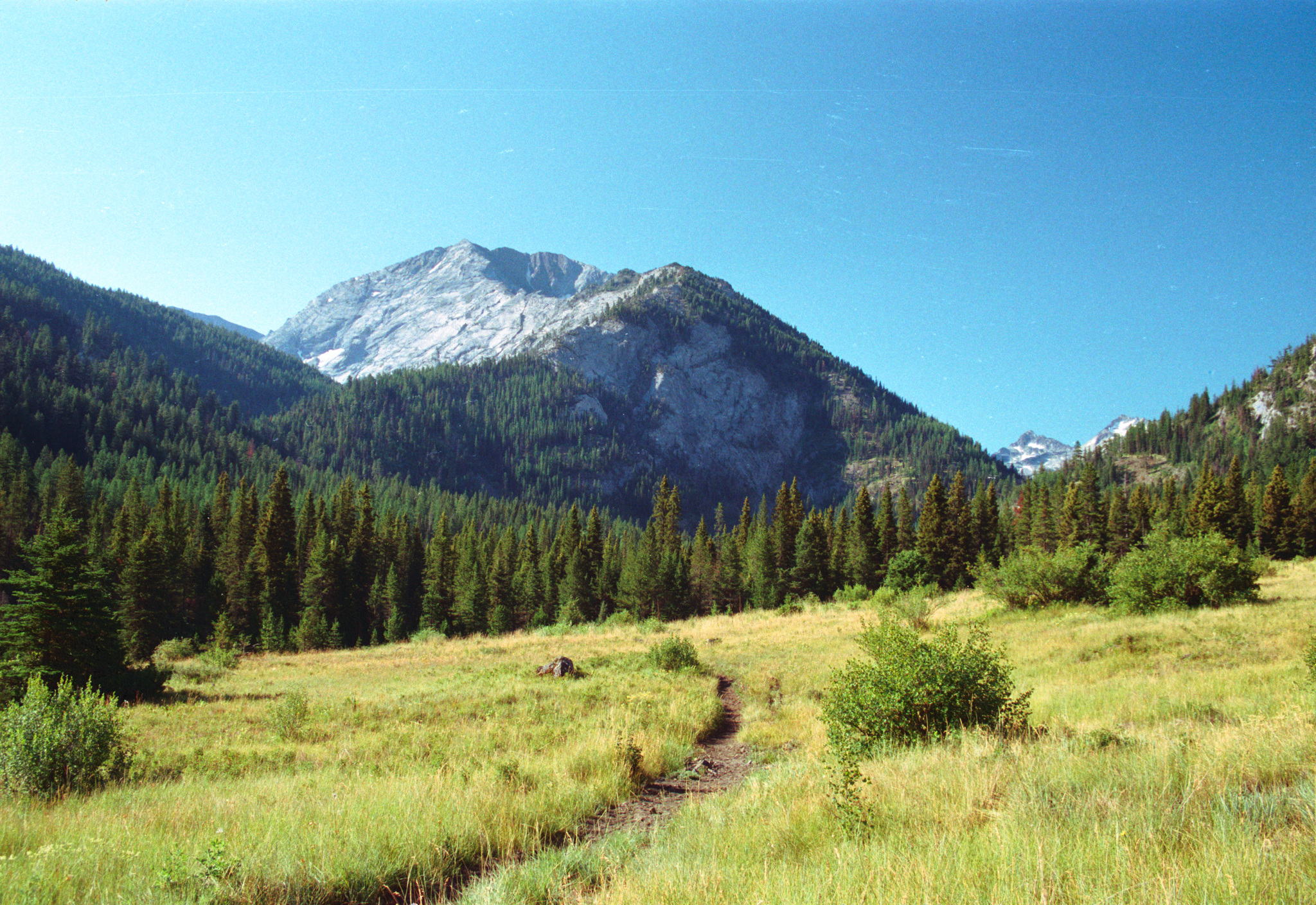
Sacajawea Peak from Hurricane Creek Trail

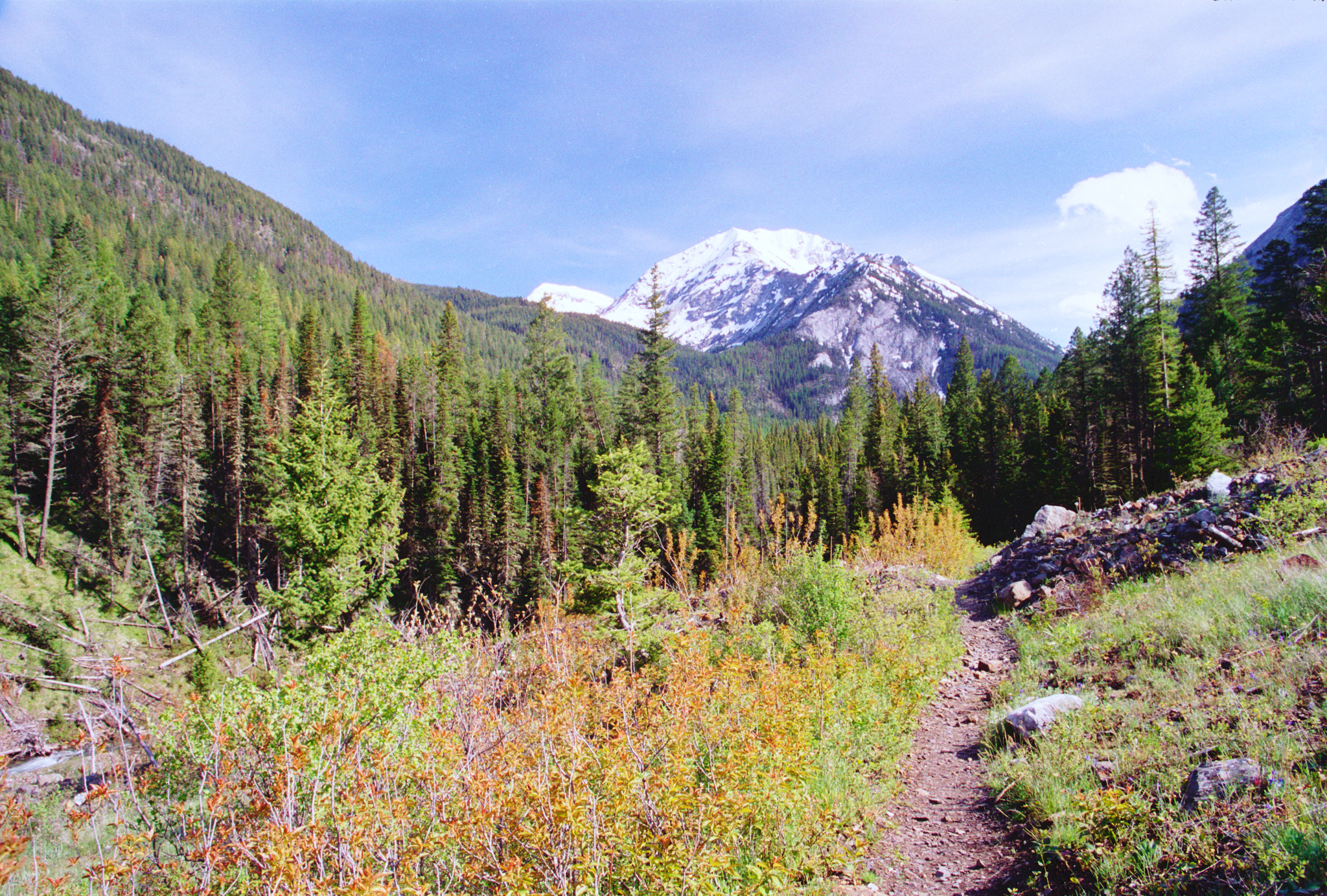
Sacajawea Peak from Hurricane Creek Trail

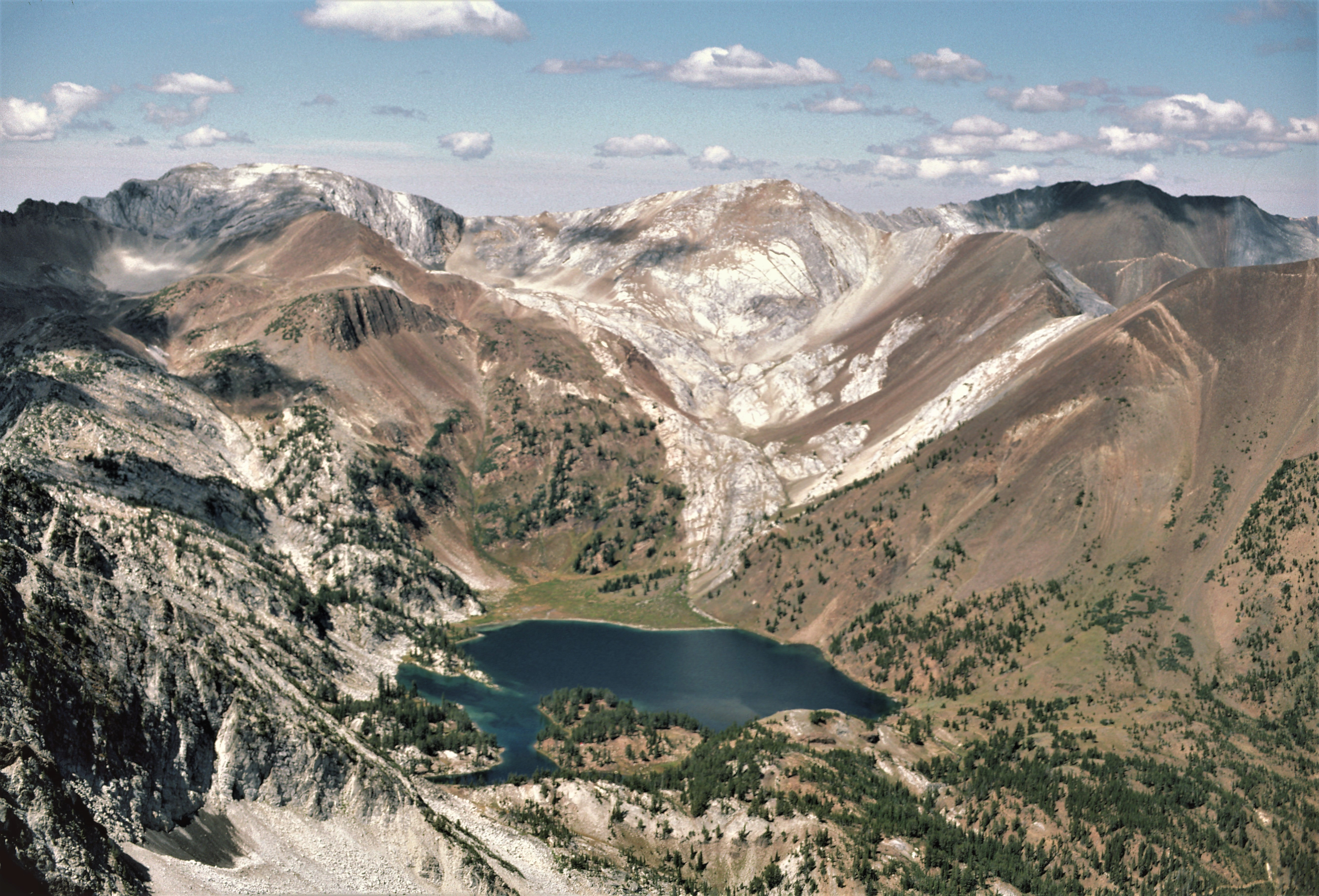
Sacajawea Peak in upper right corner.
Matterhorn upper left, Ice Lake centered

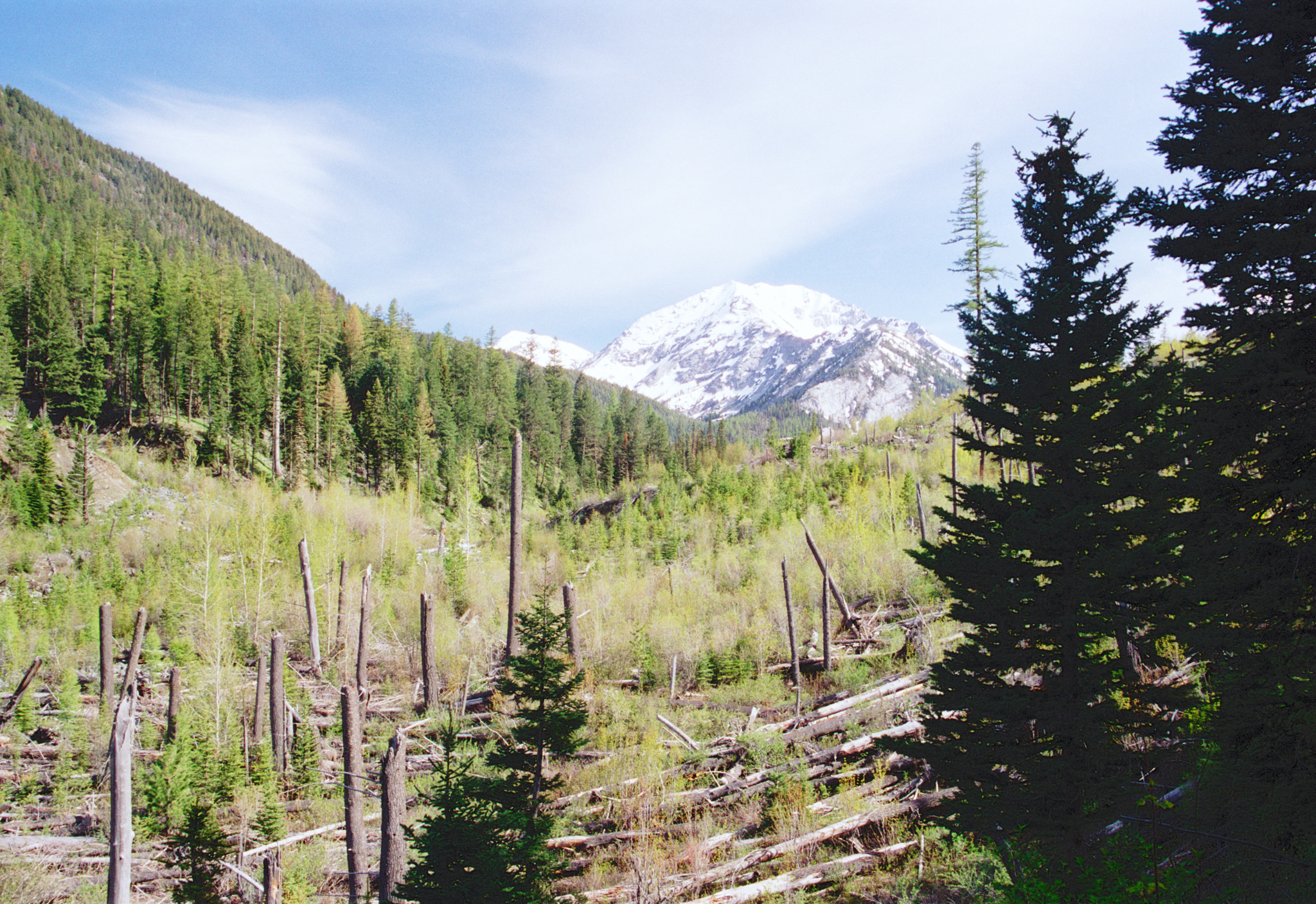
Sacajawea Peak from Hurricane Creek Trail
