= Heat (disambiguation) =

Heat is energy in transfer to or from a thermodynamic system by mechanisms other than thermodynamic work or transfer of matter.

Heat or HEAT may also refer to:

== Science and technology ==
=== Medicine ===
- Fever, a body temperature above the normal range in response to internal physiological conditions
- Heat illness, a spectrum of disorders due to environmental exposure to heat:
  - Heat cramps, muscle spasms that result from loss of large amount of salt and water through exercise
  - Heat edema, swelling of the hands and/or feet due to over-expansion of the blood vessels in the extremities in response to heat
  - Heat exhaustion, caused by the loss of water and electrolytes through sweating
  - Heat rash, skin irritations caused by excessive sweating or blocked sweat glands
  - Heat stroke, with a body temperature greater than 40.6 °C (105.1 °F)
  - Heat syncope, fainting or dizziness as a result of overheating
  - Heat tetany, cramps and seizures caused by calcium and/or magnesium loss due to excessive sweating in short periods of stress in high heat
- Hyperthermia, elevated body temperature due to failed thermoregulation that occurs when a body produces or absorbs more heat than it dissipates
  - Malignant hyperthermia, a type of severe reaction that may occur to susceptible patients during general anesthesia
- Hot flash or hot flush, a feeling of heat, with sweating and increased heart rate, usually experienced by menopausal women due to low estradiol

=== Computing ===
- HEAT (software), help desk software by FrontRange Solutions
- Highly Evasive Adaptive Threat, cybersecurity attack type
- OpenStack Heat, the orchestration component of the OpenStack infrastructure-as-a-service software platform

=== Other uses in science and technology ===
- Heat wave, a period of excessively hot weather
- HEAT repeat, a solenoid protein domain found in a number of cytoplasmic proteins
- In metallurgy, one batch of molten metal processed in a converter or open hearth furnace
  - In forging, one cycle of heating material and working it before returning it to a heat source
- High Elevation Auger Telescope, at the Pierre Auger Observatory, Argentina

== Arts, entertainment and media ==
=== Games ===
- Heat: Pedal to the Metal, a 2022 strategy board game
- Need for Speed Heat, a 2019 racing video game

=== Films ===
- Heat (1963 film), a Soviet drama directed by Larisa Shepitko
- Heat (1972 film), an American drama directed by Paul Morrissey, starring Sylvia Miles and Joe Dallesandro
- Heat (1986 film), an American action-thriller film directed by Dick Richards and Jerry Jameson, starring Burt Reynolds
- Heat (1995 film), an American crime drama directed by Michael Mann, starring Al Pacino, Robert De Niro and Val Kilmer
- Natural Justice: Heat (1996), an Australian television film, sometimes referred to as Heat, directed by Scott Hartford-Davis
- Heat (2006 film), a Russian comedy directed Rezo Gigineishvili
- The Heat (film), a 2013 comedy directed by Paul Feig, starring Sandra Bullock and Melissa McCarthy

=== Literature ===
- Heat (Buffy/Angel novel), a 2004 original novel based on the television series Buffy the Vampire Slayer and Angel
- Heat (Goldman novel), 1985, by William Goldman
- Heat (Lupica novel), a 2006 sports novel written by Mike Lupica
- Heat, a 2006 book on climate change by George Monbiot
- Heat, a 2006 book on cooking and food by Bill Buford
- Heat & Other Stories, a 1991 collection by Joyce Carol Oates
- Heat, a 1994 novel by Stuart Woods
- Heat (manga), 1999, written by Yoshiyuki Okamura

=== Fictional characters ===
- Heat, in the Bust a Groove and Bust a Groove 2 video games
- Heat, a protagonist in the Digital Devil Saga video game series

=== Music ===
==== Albums ====
- Heat (Colder album), 2005
- Heat (Jimmy Barnes album), 1993
- Heat (Shinichi Atobe album), 2018
- Heat (Soul for Real album), 1999
- Heat (soundtrack), score for the 1995 film Heat
- The Heat (Toni Braxton album), 2000

==== EPs ====
- Heat (Beyoncé EP), 2011
- Heat ((G)I-dle EP), 2023
- Heat (SG Lewis and Tove Lo EP), 2024
- Heat EP: All Pain Is Beat by Combichrist, 2009

==== Songs ====
- "Heat" (50 Cent song)
- "Heat" (Brockhampton song)
- "Heat" (Chris Brown song)
- "Heat" (Kelly Clarkson song)
- "Heat" (Kim Hyun-joong song)
- "Heat", by David Bowie from The Next Day
- "Heat", by Eminem from Revival
- "Heat", by Loona from + +
- "Heat", by SG Lewis and Tove Lo from Heat (SG Lewis and Tove Lo EP)
- "HEAT", by Tigers Jaw from Tigers Jaw

==== Performers ====
- H.E.A.T (band), a Swedish rock band

=== Periodicals ===
- Heat (magazine), a British magazine
- HEAT (magazine), an international Australian literary magazine

=== Television ===
- Heat (TV channel), a British television channel
- Heat (Irish TV series), an Irish prime time reality television series broadcast on RTÉ One
- Heat (2023 TV series), an upcoming action-thriller television series
- "Heat" (Dark Angel), an episode of the television series Dark Angel

== Food ==
- Pungency or piquantness ("Heat" or "hotness"), the spiciness of foods such as black pepper, chili peppers, garlic and onions, ginger, mustard, and horseradish
- Heat, the traditional and most common means of cooking food
- Heat, applied post-preparation to food with a heat lamp, to prevent the growth of microorganisms before the food is consumed

== Military and law enforcement ==
- EADS Mako/HEAT (High Energy Advanced Trainer)
- Firearm (slang: heat), usually a pistol
- High-explosive anti-tank, a warhead with a shaped charge
- HEAT, hostile environment awareness training
- Heat, slang for police surveillance or attention

== Sports ==
=== Basketball ===
- Guildford Heat, a British Basketball League team
- Kurasini Heat, a Tanzanian basketball team
- Miami Heat, a National Basketball Association team
- Saigon Heat, a Vietnamese team

=== Wrestling ===
- Heat (professional wrestling), applause or booing given by fans to a professional wrestler
- ECW Heat Wave, a professional wrestling pay-per-view event
- WWE Heat, a professional wrestling television program
- Heat (wrestler), ring name of Japanese professional wrestler Minoru Tanaka

=== Other uses in sports ===
- Heat, a preliminary race or match in a sports tournament
- Fastball (colloquialism: heat), in baseball
- Abbotsford Heat, an ice hockey team that plays in the AHL
- Brisbane Heat, a Big Bash cricket team
- Laredo Heat, a United Soccer Leagues Premier Development League soccer team

== Other uses ==
- Heat (perfume), or Beyoncé Heat, a women's cologne endorsed by singer Beyoncé Knowles
- Heat, one of the eight principles in Chinese medicine

== See also ==
- Thermoception, the sensation and perception of temperature or temperature differences
- Heat flux, a flow of energy per unit of area per unit of time
- Calorie (Latin: calor: heat), the amount of heat needed to raise the temperature of a quantity of water by one degree Celsius
- Geothermal energy
- Geothermal power
- In heat or on heat, a period of increased sexual drive in the estrous cycle of mammals
- Heat pump
- Hīt, Iraq (pronounced "heat")
- Renewable heat
- The Heat (disambiguation)
- Hot (disambiguation)
- Temperature (disambiguation)
