= Mount Craig =

Mount Craig may refer to:

- Mount Craig (Colorado), United States
- Mount Craig (North Carolina), United States
- Mount Craig (Yukon), Canada

== See also ==
- Craig Mountain, Oregon, United States
