= Heater (disambiguation) =

A heater is an appliance whose purpose is to generate heat for a building.

Heater or Heaters may also refer to:

== Science, technology and engineering ==
- Central heating, a system used to heat an entire building

=== Devices ===
- Aquarium heater, in fishkeeping, used to warm aquarium water
- Boiler or heater, used to heat water for use in a heating system
- Furnace or heater, used to heat buildings using a central system
- Radiator (heating) or heater, used to transmit heat from a boiler
- Space heater, that heats a single area
  - Gas heater, that heats an area using gas
  - Oil heater, that heats oil to heat a room

=== Physics ===
- Heating element, a device that converts electricity into heat
- Cathode heater, in vacuum tubes and gas-filled tubes
  - Heater, a vacuum tube filament for an indirectly heated cathode in a vacuum tube

== Music ==
- Heaters (band), an American rock band
- "The Heater", a song by The Mutton Birds
- "Heater" (instrumental), a song by Samim
- "Heaters", a song on the IllScarlett album Clearly in Another Fine Mess
- "Heaterz", a song by Wu-Tang Clan from Wu-Tang Forever

== Other uses ==
- Heater (surname)
- Heater shield, a type of shield
- Heaters, West Virginia, an unincorporated community in the US
- A nickname for a fastball
