= Craig Mountain =

Mountain peak in Oregon, United States

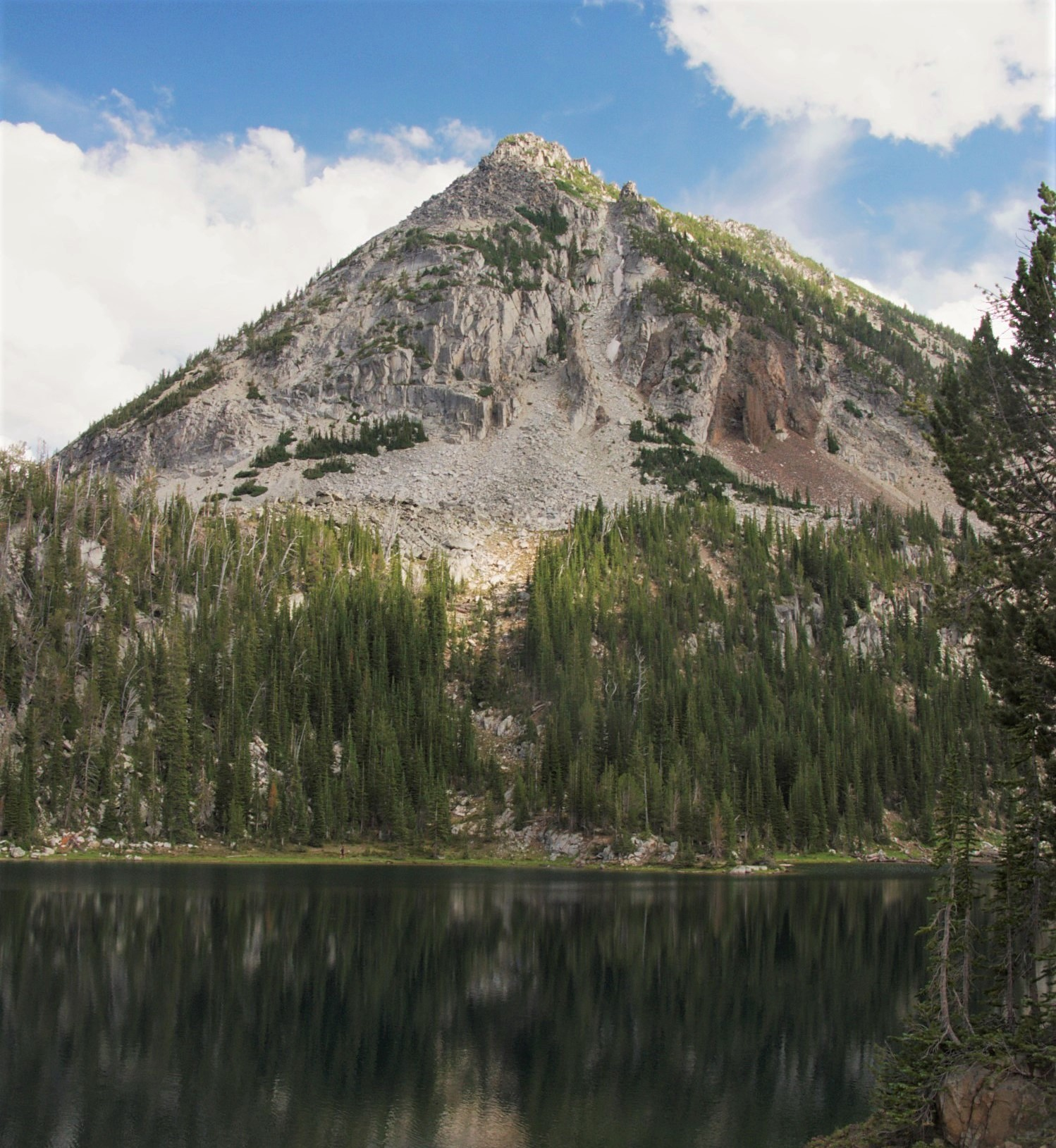
- Northwest aspect, from Ice Lake

Highest point
- Elevation: 9,204 ft (2,805 m)
- Prominence: 484 ft (148 m)
- Isolation: 0.55 mi (0.89 km)
- Coordinates: 45°13′19″N 117°15′46″W

Geography
- Location within Oregon Location within the United States
- Location: Eagle Cap Wilderness
- Country: United States of America
- State: Oregon
- County: Wallowa
- Parent range: Wallowa Mountains
- Topo map: USGS Eagle Cap

Craig Mountain is a 9,204-foot elevation (2,805 m) mountain summit located in Wallowa County, Oregon, US.

== Description ==
Craig Mountain is located 10 miles south of Joseph, Oregon, in the Wallowa Mountains. It is set within the Eagle Cap Wilderness on land managed by Wallowa–Whitman National Forest. The mountain is situated one-half mile southeast of Ice Lake and two miles east of Matterhorn. The peak ranks as the 33rd-highest summit in Oregon. Precipitation runoff from the mountain drains to the West Fork of the Wallowa River. Topographic relief is significant as the summit rises over 3,200 feet (980 meters) above the river in approximately one mile. This landform's toponym has been officially adopted by the United States Board on Geographic Names.

== Climate ==
Based on the Köppen climate classification, Craig Mountain is located in a subarctic climate zone characterized by long, usually very cold winters, and mild summers. Winter temperatures can drop below −10 °F with wind chill factors below −20 °F. Most precipitation in the area is caused by orographic lift. Thunderstorms are common in the summer.

== Gallery ==
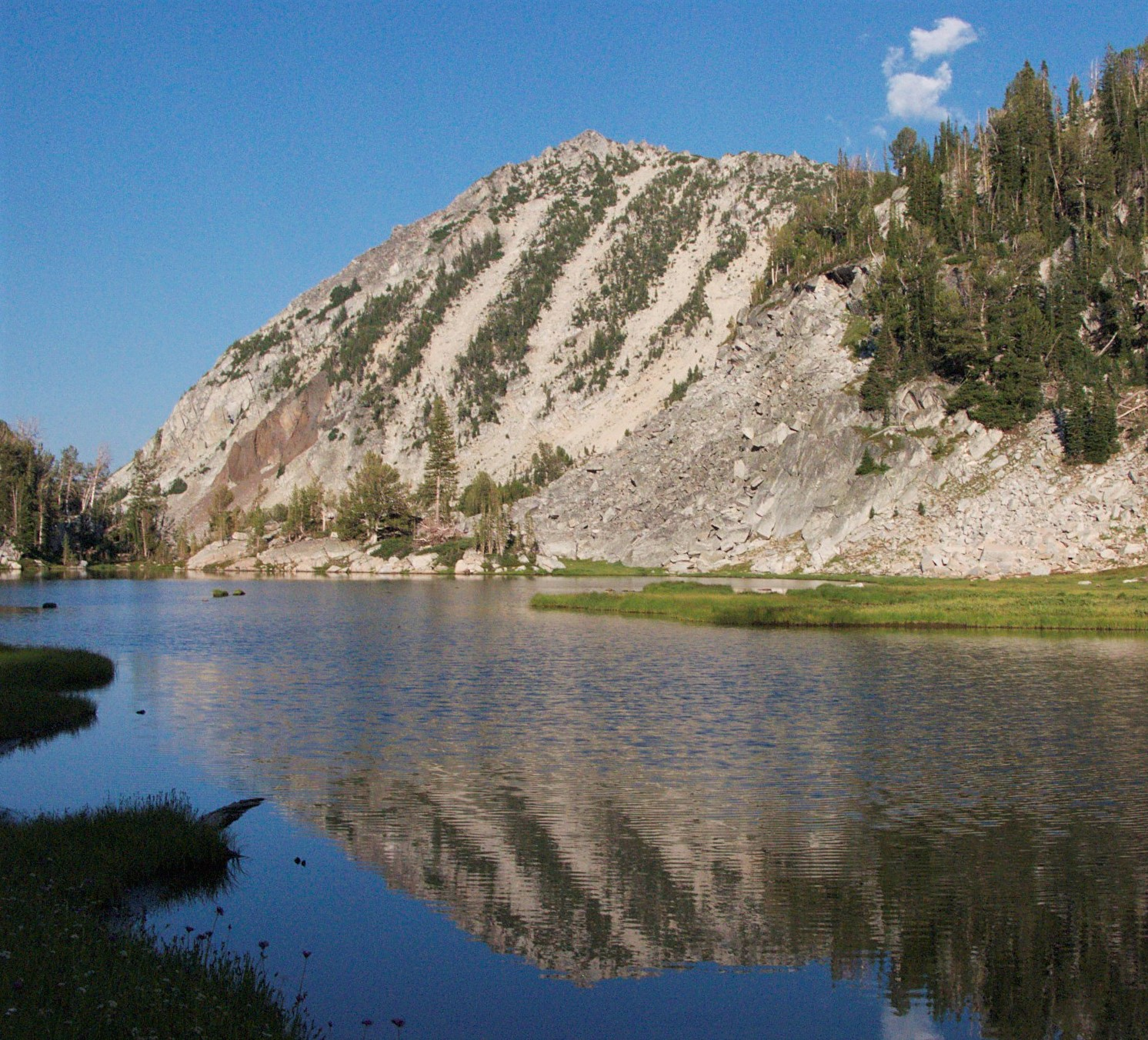
West aspect

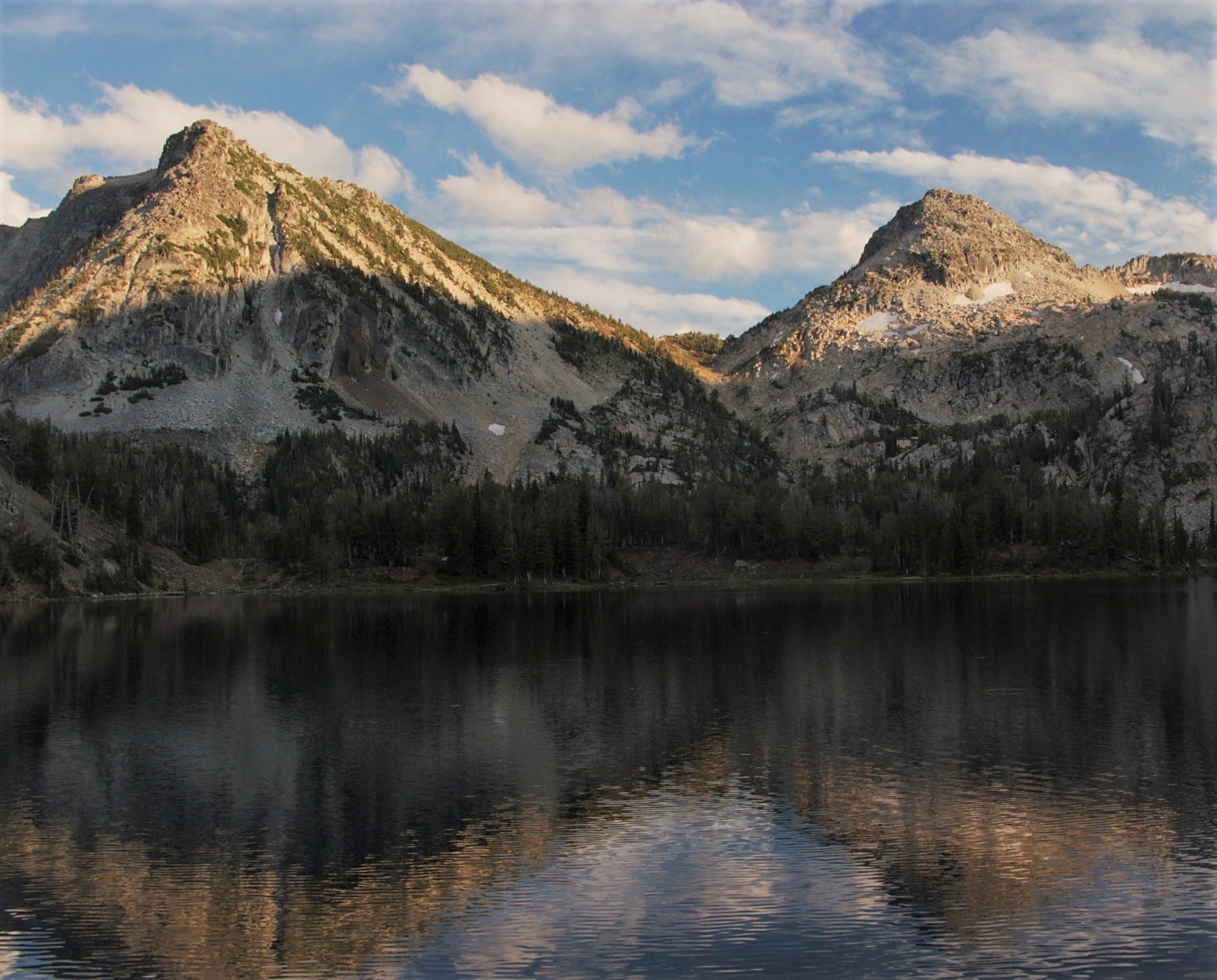
Craig Mountain (left) and Ice Lake

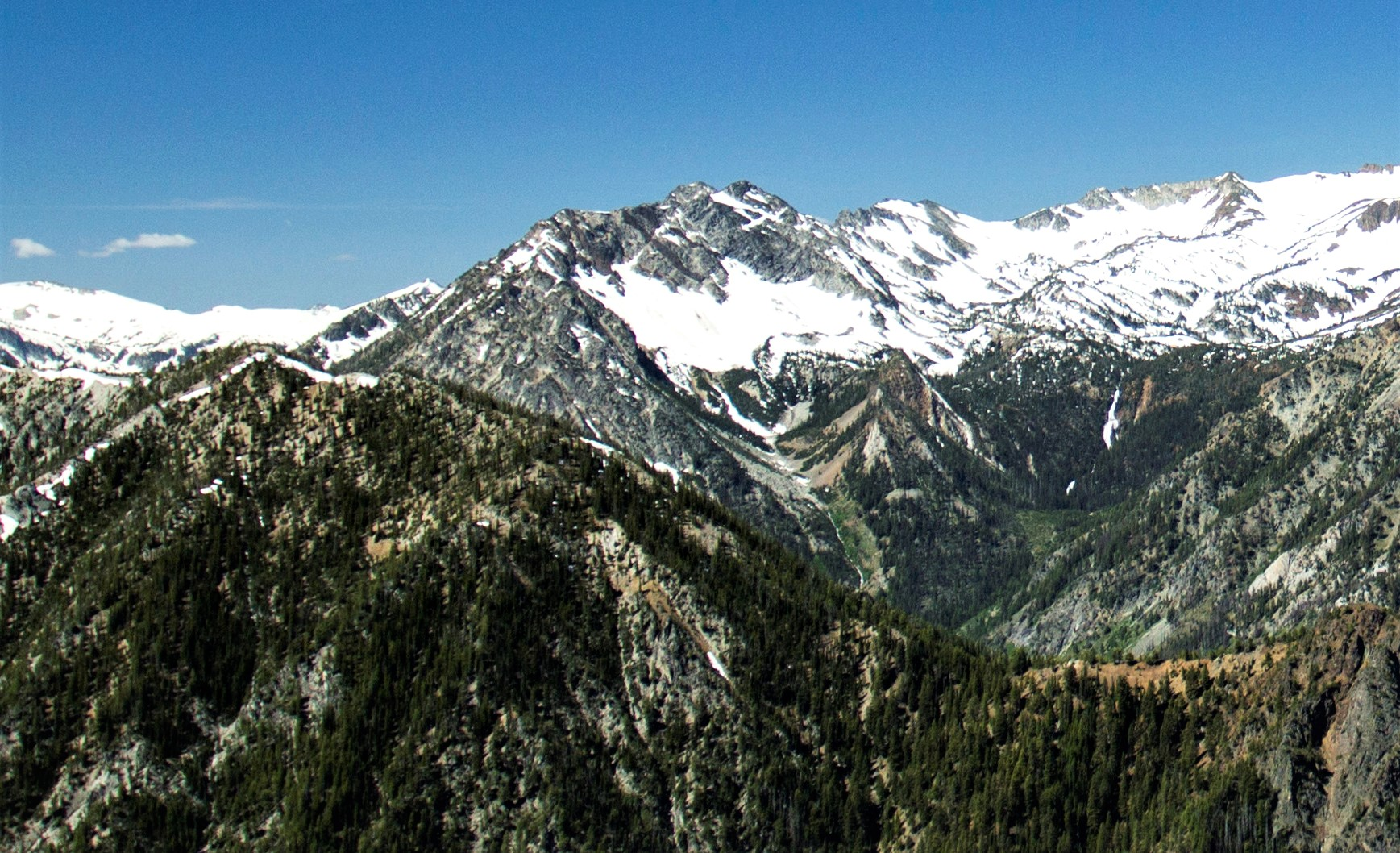
Northeast aspect of Craig Mountain seen from Mt. Howard

== See also ==
- List of mountain peaks of Oregon
