= Temperature (disambiguation) =

Temperature is a physical quantity that expresses hot and cold.

Temperature may also refer to:

== Science and technology ==
- Atmospheric temperature
- Thermodynamic temperature, a quantity defined in thermodynamics
- Color temperature, of a light source
- Effective temperature, of a body such as a star or planet
- Human body temperature
- Body temperature in domestic animals: see: Fever#Other_species
- Regulation of body temperature: see: thermoregulation
- Fever or "having a temperature", the elevation of the body temperature
- Noise temperature, a measure of the noise of an electronic component
- Temperature (softmax function), a parameter that alters the entropy of the softmax function or Boltzmann distribution

== Music ==
- "Temperature" (Sean Paul song), 2006
- "Temperature" (Psychic Fever from Exile Tribe song), 2023
- "Temperature" a song by Zion from True & Livin'
- "Temperature", a song by Blaque from Blaque Out
- "Temperature", a song by Little Walter

== Other uses ==
- Temperature (game theory), a measure of the value of a game to its players

== See also ==
- Doneness, a gauge of how thoroughly cooked a cut of meat is based on its color, juiciness, and internal temperature
- Planetary equilibrium temperature, a theoretical temperature that a planet would be as a black body being heated only by its parent star
- Thermal radiation, generated by the thermal motion of particles in matter
- Heat (disambiguation)
