= The Heat =

The Heat may refer to:

- The Heat (film), a 2013 film with Sandra Bullock and Melissa McCarthy
- The Heat (Nona Hendryx album), a 1985 album by Nona Hendryx
- The Heat (Toni Braxton album), a 2000 album by Toni Braxton, or the title track
- The Heat (Jesse Malin album), a 2004 album by Jesse Malin
- The Heat (Needtobreathe album), a 2007 album by Needtobreathe, or the title track
- The Heat (Dan Reed Network album), a 1991 album by Dan Reed Network
- "The Heat" (Psychic Fever song), a 2024 song by Psychic Fever from Exile Tribe
- "The Heat", an episode of the cartoon The New Adventures of He-Man
- The Heat (Sirius XM), Sirius XM Radio's Urban Contemporary channel
- Miami Heat, an American basketball team
- The Heat with Mark McEwan, a reality TV series
- Denis Ovens (born 1957), nicknamed The Heat, English darts player

== See also ==
- "The Heat (Musica Fiesta)", a 2002 song by Akina Nakamori
- Heat (disambiguation)
