= Yes (Shinichi Atobe album) =

Studio album by Shinichi Atobe
- Released: 10 July 2020
- Genre: Electronic
- Length: 46:19
- Label: DDS

Shinichi Atobe chronology
Heat (2018)	Yes (2020)	Love of Plastic (2022)

Yes is a studio album by Japanese record producer Shinichi Atobe. It was released on 10 July 2020 through DDS. It received universal acclaim from critics.

== Background ==
Shinichi Atobe is a Japanese record producer from Saitama Prefecture. In 2001, he released the Ship-Scope EP through Chain Reaction. He released Butterfly Effect (2014), World (2016), From the Heart, It's a Start, a Work of Art (2017), and Heat (2018), through Demdike Stare's record label DDS. Yes is his fifth studio album. It was released on 10 July 2020 through DDS.

== Critical reception ==
Professional ratings
Aggregate scores
Source	Rating
Metacritic	83/100
Review scores
Source	Rating
Pitchfork	7.8/10
PopMatters	8/10

According to the review aggregator Metacritic, Yes received "universal acclaim" based on a weighted average score of 83 out of 100 from 4 critic scores.

Matt McDermott of Resident Advisor stated, "Beyond the title-track, Yes mostly does away with the classy, tech house-style snap prevalent on 2018's Heat." Gabriela Helfet of The Vinyl Factory wrote, "Contained within are slow-bubbling IDM, house and techno tunes to get lost in, honing on the sparkle of a piano loop or synth ascension to incantatory effect – they're the kinds of tracks that inspire dreaming of better days." Miles Bowe of Stereogum commented that "Yes has now become the best new entry-point into his mysterious world."

=== Accolades ===
Year-end lists for Yes
Publication	List	Rank	Ref.
Resident Advisor	2020's Best Albums	—	
The Vinyl Factory	Our 50 Favourite Albums of 2020	28	

== Track listing ==
Yes track listing
No.	Title	Length
1.	"Ocean 7"	5:13
2.	"Lake 2"	6:56
3.	"Yes"	8:01
4.	"Lake 3"	7:12
5.	"Rain 3"	7:43
6.	"Loop 1"	2:35
7.	"Ocean 1"	8:52
Total length:		46:19

== Personnel ==
Credits adapted from liner notes.

- Shinichi Atobe
- Mat Thornton – photography
