= Matterhorn (Oregon) =

Mountain summit in Wallowa County, Oregon, US

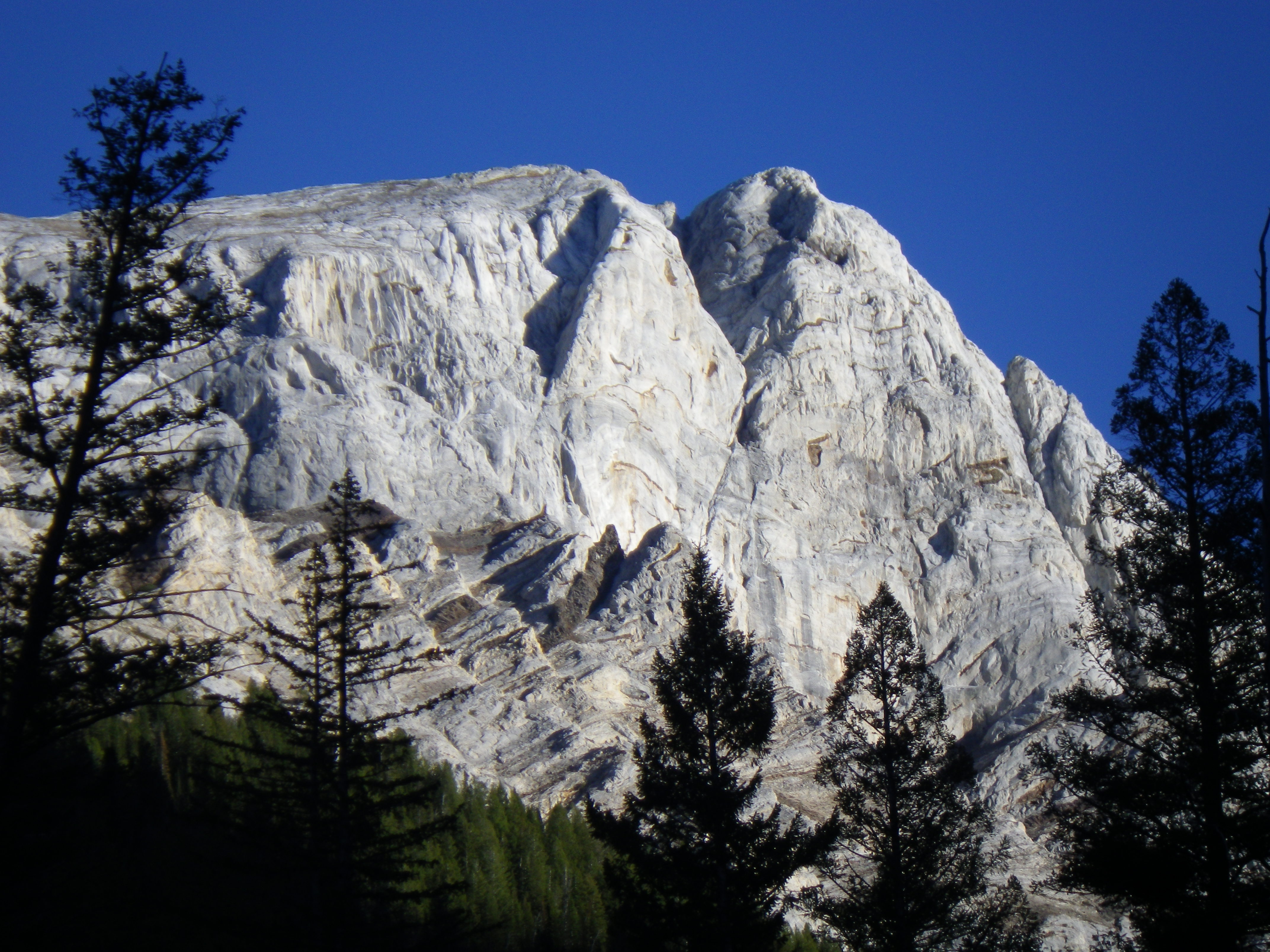
- Northwest aspect of Matterhorn

Highest point
- Elevation: 9,835 ft (2,998 m)
- Prominence: 333 ft (101 m)
- Parent peak: Sacajawea Peak (9,838 ft)
- Isolation: 1.25 mi (2.01 km)
- Coordinates: 45°13′44″N 117°17′52″W

Geography
- Location within Oregon Location within the United States
- Location: Eagle Cap Wilderness
- Country: United States of America
- State: Oregon
- County: Wallowa
- Parent range: Wallowa Mountains
- Topo map: USGS Eagle Cap

Geology
- Rock type: limestone

Climbing
- Easiest route: class 2 hiking via Ice Lake

Matterhorn is a 9,835-foot (2,998 m) mountain summit located in Wallowa County, Oregon, US.

== Description ==
Matterhorn is located 10 miles south-southwest of Joseph, Oregon, in the Wallowa Mountains. It is set within the Eagle Cap Wilderness on land managed by Wallowa–Whitman National Forest. The peak is situated 1.8 mile west-northwest of Craig Mountain, 1.5 mile west of Ice Lake and 1.24 mile south of line parent Sacajawea Peak. The peak ranks as the second-highest in the Wallowa Mountains, and the seventh-highest summit in Oregon. It was once considered to be the highest in the Wallowas, before Sacajawea Peak was determined to be a few feet higher. Precipitation runoff from the mountain drains west into Hurricane Creek and east into Adam Creek, both of which are tributaries of the Wallowa River. Topographic relief is significant as the summit rises over 3,200 feet (980 meters) above Hurricane Creek in less than one mile. The peak is composed of limestone of the Martin Bridge Formation. This landform's toponym has been officially adopted by the United States Board on Geographic Names. It is so named because of a likeness to the famous Matterhorn on the Swiss–Italian border, and the name has been in use since at least 1926.

== Climate ==
Based on the Köppen climate classification, Matterhorn is located in a subarctic climate zone characterized by long, usually very cold winters, and mild summers. Winter temperatures can drop below −10 °F with wind chill factors below −20 °F. Most precipitation in the area is caused by orographic lift. Thunderstorms are common in the summer.

== Gallery ==
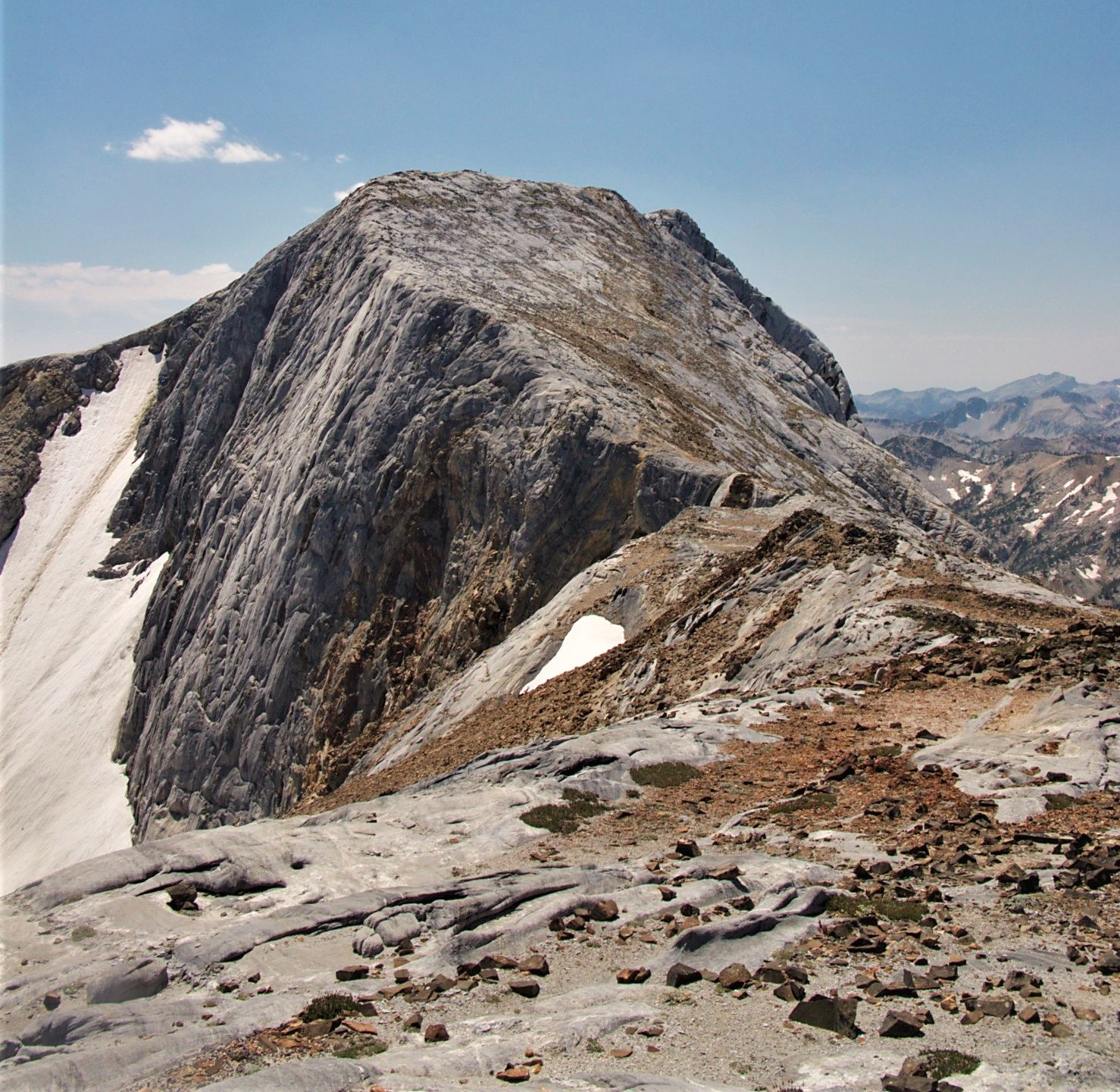
North aspect of Matterhorn seen from traverse to Sacajawea Peak.

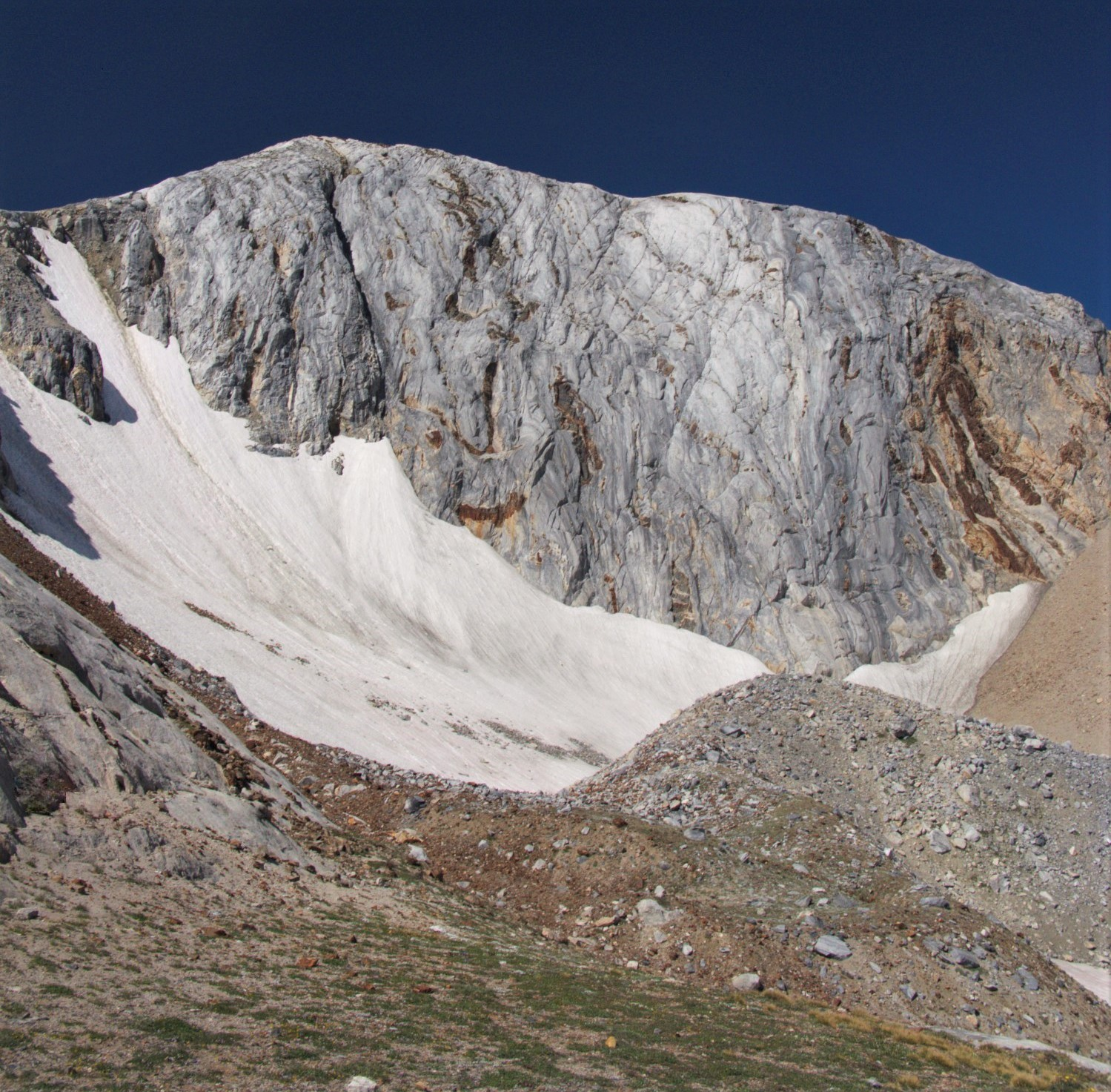
Northeast aspect

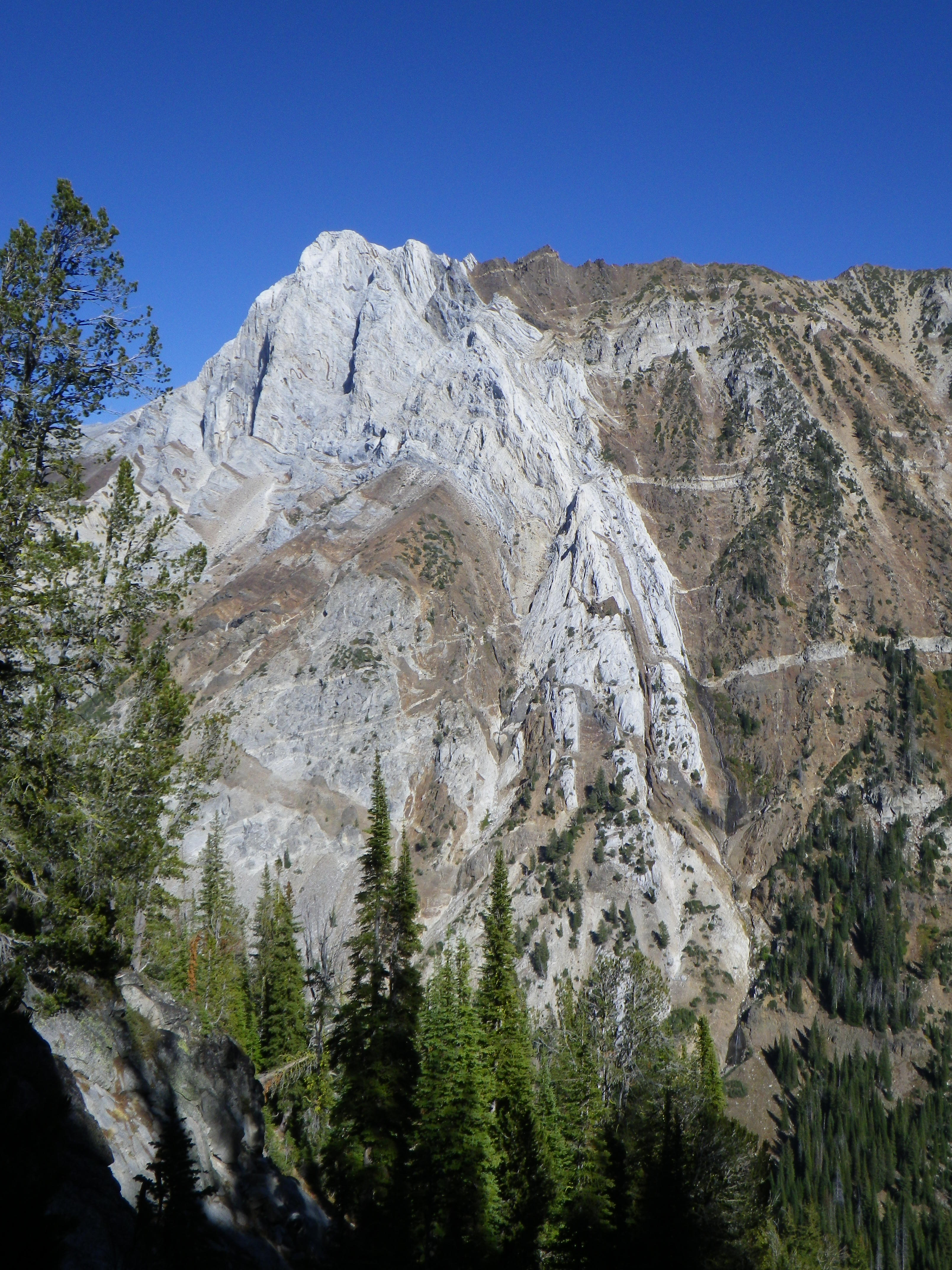
Southwest aspect

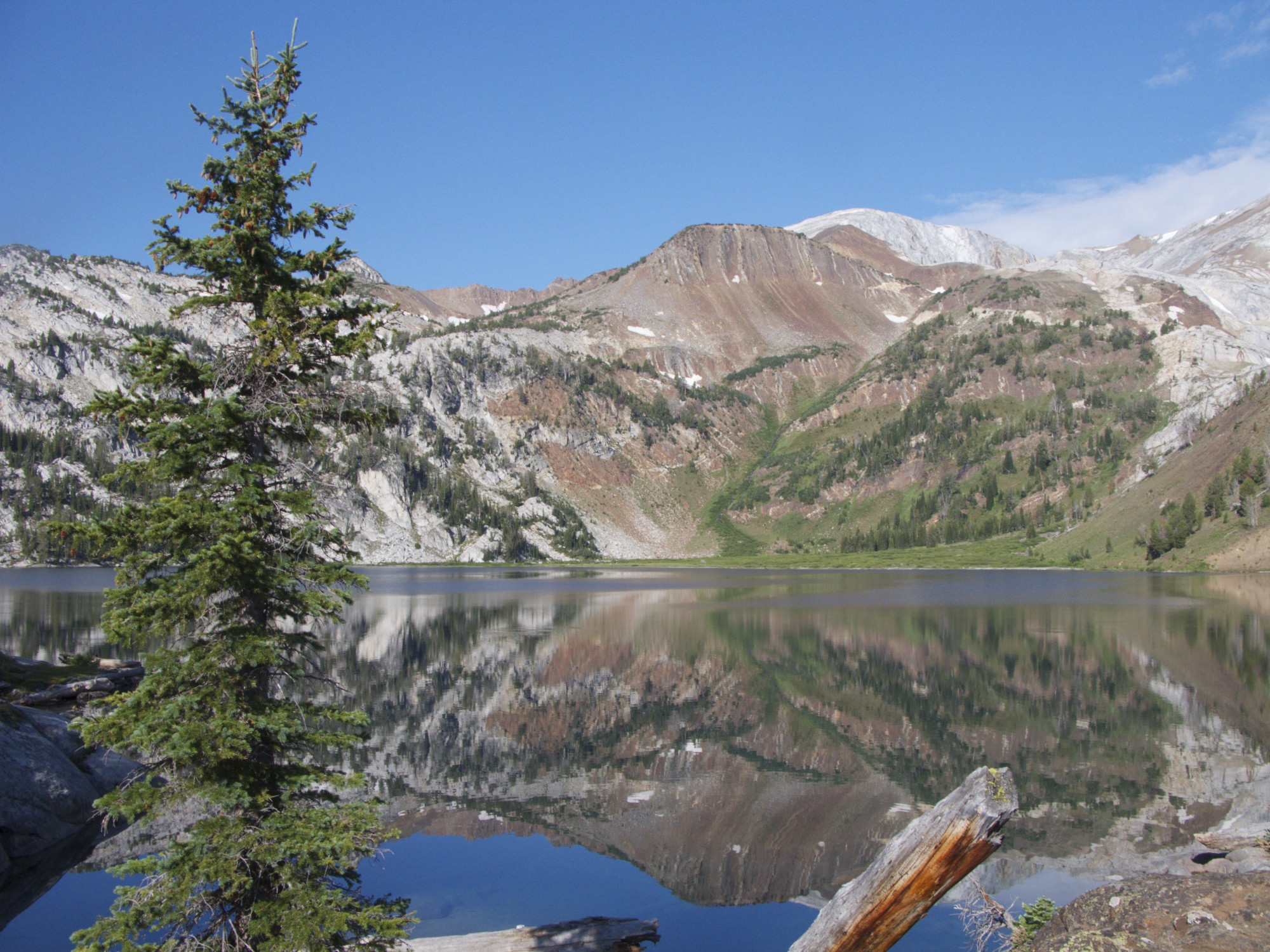
East aspect of Matterhorn from Ice Lake

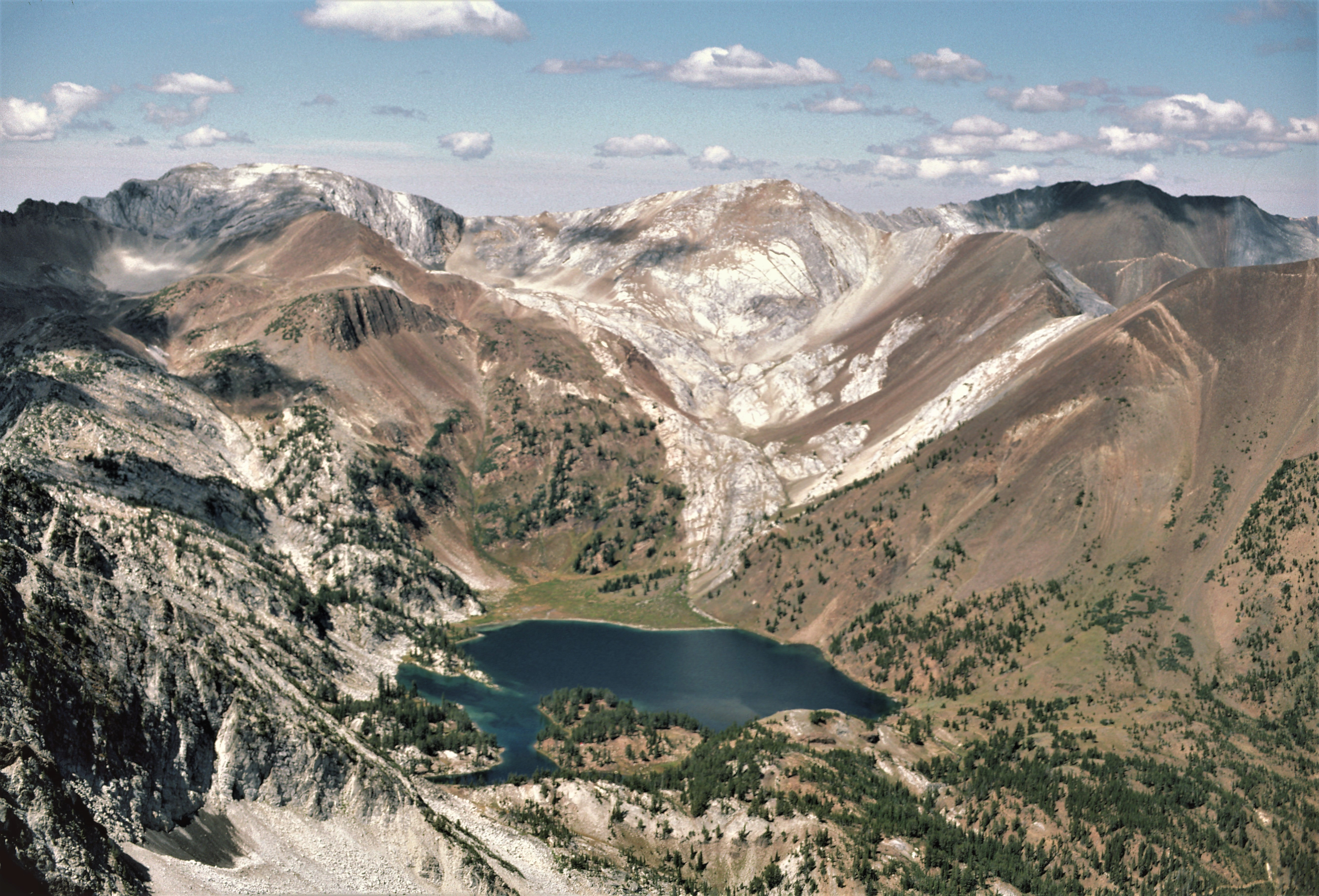
Matterhorn upper left, Ice Lake centered, Sacajawea Peak in upper right corner

== See also ==
- List of mountain peaks of Oregon
