= Heater (surname) =

Heater is a surname. Notable people with the surname include:

- Chuck Heater (born 1952), American football player and coach
- Danny Heater (born 1942), American high school basketball record holder
- Don Heater (born 1950), American football running back
- Larry Heater (born 1958), American football running back

== See also ==
- Herter
