= Heat (Shinichi Atobe album) =

Studio album by Shinichi Atobe
- Released: 5 September 2018
- Genre: Electronic
- Length: 59:15
- Label: DDS

Shinichi Atobe chronology
| From the Heart, It's a Start, a Work of Art (2017) | Heat (2018) | Yes (2020) |

Heat is a studio album by Japanese record producer Shinichi Atobe. It was released on 5 September 2018 through DDS.

== Background ==
Shinichi Atobe is a Japanese record producer from Saitama Prefecture. In 2001, he released the Ship-Scope EP through Chain Reaction. He released Butterfly Effect (2014), World (2016), and From the Heart, It's a Start, a Work of Art (2017), through Demdike Stare's record label DDS. Heat was released on 5 September 2018 through DDS.

== Critical reception ==
Professional ratings
Review scores
| Source | Rating |
|---|---|
| Pitchfork | 8.0/10 |
| Resident Advisor | 4.5/5 |
| Tiny Mix Tapes | 4/5 stars |

Ray Philp of Resident Advisor stated, "Heat is not only Atobe's most satisfying LP yet, but a fresh perspective on the reclusive artist's signature sound." Daniel Bromfield of PopMatters described the album as "the sunniest music the elusive Japanese producer's ever made." Christian Eede of The Quietus wrote, "Atobe's strongest quality has always been his ability to turn heads with the most minimal of developments in his tracks, and it shows no sign of diminishing on Heat."

=== Accolades ===
Year-end lists for Heat
| Publication | List | Rank | Ref. |
|---|---|---|---|
| Crack | The Top 50 Albums of 2018 | 15 | |
| Resident Advisor | 2018's Best Albums | — | |
| The Vinyl Factory | Our 50 Favourite Albums of 2018 | 42 | |

== Track listing ==
Heat track listing
| No. | Title | Length |
|---|---|---|
| 1. | "So Good, So Right" | 12:17 |
| 2. | "Heat 2" | 8:02 |
| 3. | "Heat 4" | 8:18 |
| 4. | "Heat 1" | 9:58 |
| 5. | "Bonus" | 3:02 |
| 6. | "Heat 3" | 9:37 |
| 7. | "So Good, So Right 2" | 8:01 |
| Total length: | | 59:15 |

== Personnel ==
Credits adapted from liner notes.

- Shinichi Atobe
- Mat Thornton – photography
