= Ice Lake (Oregon) =

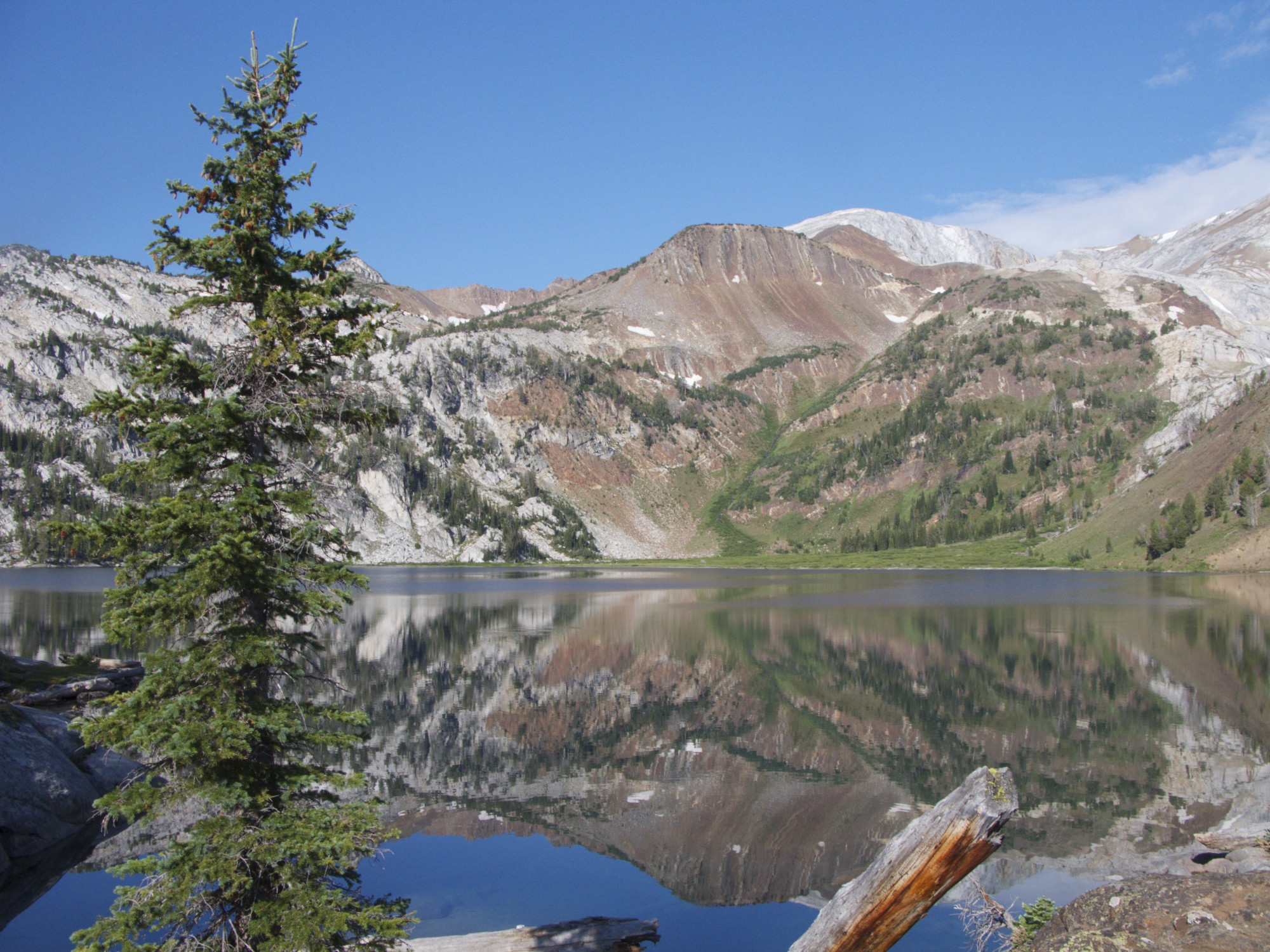
- West shore of Ice Lake with the Matterhorn in the background

- Location within Oregon Location within the United States
- Location: Wallowa County, Oregon
- Coordinates: 45°13′45″N 117°16′22″W
- Type: Reservoir
- Basin countries: United States
- Surface elevation: 7,854 ft (2,394 m)

Ice Lake is a small freshwater lake at about 7,900 feet (2,400 m) on the south skirt of the Hurwal Divide within the Eagle Cap Wilderness region in Wallowa County, in northeastern Oregon, United States. Its outflow is Adam Creek, which produces several waterfalls including 480 feet (150 m) tall Ice Falls. Ice Lake is the traditional base camp for hikers climbing the Matterhorn, one of the Wallowa Mountains.

== See also ==
- List of lakes in Oregon
