= Heaters (band) =

American alternative rock band

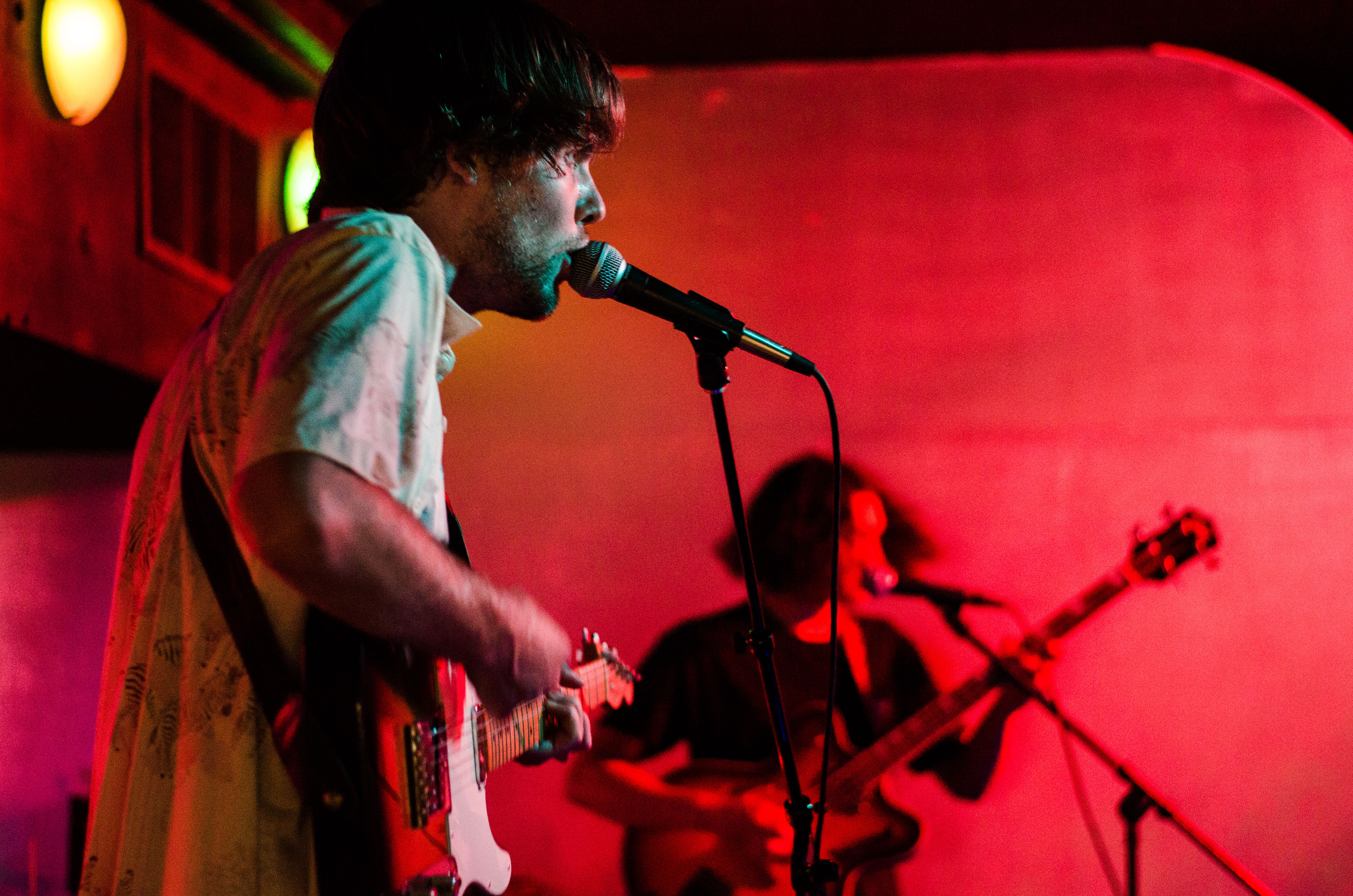
- Nolan Krebs & Andrew Tamlyn on stage May 2015

Background information
- Origin: Grand Rapids, Michigan, US
- Genres: Alternative rock, garage rock, psychedelic rock
- Years active: 2013–present
- Labels: Dizzybird Records; Stolen Body Records; Beyond Beyond Is Beyond
- Members: Nolan Krebs; Joshua Korf; Ryan Hagan; Ben Taber
- Past members: Andrew Tamlyn; Alex Falardeau
- Website: heaters.bandcamp.com

Heaters is an American alternative rock band from Grand Rapids, Michigan, that released five studio albums from 2014 to 2018. The band has recently consisted of singer-bassist Nolan Krebs, drummer Joshua Korf, guitarist Ryan Hagan and singer-guitarist Ben Taber. The band's original co-frontman and guitarist Andrew Tamlyn left the band in March 2017 to focus on his new band Fyrrh.

== History ==
The band was originally formed as Plantains in 2013 as a four piece band including Alex Falardeau. High School friends Andrew Tamlyn (who had previously released material under the names Amish Bread and Yoke) and Nolan Krebs (who had been a member of Drone Wolves) moved to Grand Rapids from Midland, Michigan. The duo bonded over traditional surf music and "messed around with music a little bit" before parting ways to go to college. They moved to Grand Rapids with the purpose of pursuing a musical project together due to the area's music scene They enlisted Ann Arbor native Joshua Korf on drums, who was their new next door neighbour.

Under their original name they released a collection of demos titled Union in October 2013 via Bandcamp and a split-10" EP with Paris-based band Os Noctambulos in February 2014 via UK label Stolen Body Records. By the time the EP was released, they had already changed their name to Heaters and dropped Falardeau from their lineup. They had also already released another collection of songs via Bandcamp titled EP, and another digital-only release in April 2014 titled Brown Sugar. Commenting on their early progress and the regional buzz around the band, Krebs stated that "we’ve been playing shows pretty much every week between Ann Arbor, Grand Rapids, Chicago and Detroit. We’re also pretty obsessive about recording which we mostly do at home".

The band released their debut EP/album proper in October 2014 in the form of Solstice via Dizzybird Records in the US and Stolen Body Records in the UK. In 2015, the band signed to Beyond Beyond Is Beyond and released the single Mean Green in April that year. In support of the single, the band toured the US with the likes of Wand, Ultimate Painting, Holy Wave and Föllakzoid. They released their full length debut Holy Water Pool in September 2015 and embarked on their debut EU/UK tour though January–March 2016.

The band released their second full length release Baptistina in August 2016. Commenting on putting the album together, Tamlyn stated that "parts of Baptistina were created very much in the moment, as we had a small window to finish recording before going overseas for the winter". Whilst touring the album, they added former Knife Rituals guitarist Ryan Hagan to their live band.

In March 2017, co-frontman Andrew Tamlyn left the band prior to a planned EU/UK tour and promptly formed Fyrrh (initially called Lucid Fur) with Casey Huizenga and Logan Mooney. Heaters revealed their new lineup as a four piece, retaining live guitarist Ryan Hagan and adding additional guitarist and singer Ben Taber. on 29 April, the new lineup of the band announced that they had completed the third full length album. Third album Matterhorn was released in October 2017 via Beyond Beyond Is Beyond.

Their fifth and latest album, Suspended Youth, was released in November 2018.

== Band members ==
- Nolan Krebs – vocals, bass
- Joshua Korf – drums
- Ryan Hagan – guitar
- Ben Taber – vocals, guitar

== Studio albums ==
- Solstice (2014), Dizzybird Records
- Holy Water Pool (2015), Beyond Beyond Is Beyond
- Baptistina (2016), Beyond Beyond Is Beyond
- Matterhorn (2017), Beyond Beyond Is Beyond
- Suspended Youth (2018), Beyond Beyond is Beyond

=== EPs and singles ===
- EP (2014), self-released/Bandcamp
- "Brown Sugar" (2014), self-released/Bandcamp
- "Mean Green" (2015), Beyond Beyond Is Beyond
