= Elliott Corbett Memorial State Recreation Site =

State park in Oregon, United States

Corbett State Park
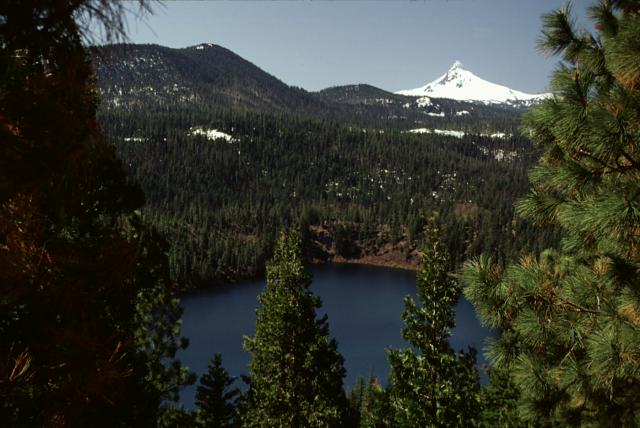
- Park area before the B&B Fire

- Location within Oregon Location within the United States
- Location: Jefferson County, Oregon
- Nearest city: Sisters, Oregon
- Coordinates: 44°24′35″N 121°46′29″W
- Area: 63 acres (25 ha)
- Created: 1952
- Operator: Oregon Parks and Recreation Department
- Open: Year-around

Elliott Corbett Memorial State Recreation Site (also known as Elliott Corbett State Park, Corbett Memorial State Park or Corbett State Park) is a state park along the south shore of Blue Lake Crater in Jefferson County, Oregon, United States. The park is named in honor of Elliott R. Corbett II, who was killed while serving in the United States Army during World War II. It includes 63 acres (25 ha) of wilderness land with very few park facilities. Corbett State Park is administered by the Oregon Parks and Recreation Department.

== Geography ==
Corbett State Park covers 63 acres (25 ha) of forest and meadow above the south shore of Blue Lake, east of the Cascade Range in Central Oregon. The park is just south of Highway 20, 4 miles (6.4 km) east of Santiam Pass and 14 miles (23 km) west of Sisters. The park’s elevation ranges from 3,468 feet (1,057 m) at the shore of Blue Lake to over 3,600 feet (1,100 m) on the slopes above the lake.

Blue Lake fills a deep volcanic maar to a depth of 314 feet (96 m), making it one of the deepest lakes in Oregon. The steep caldera slopes make the lake shore in Corbett State Park very rugged. The lake's only outlet is Link Creek, a shallow stream that begins at the north end of Blue Lake, opposite from the park. Link Creek flows into Suttle Lake 0.6 miles (0.97 km) downstream.

== History ==
In the 19th century, the central meadow of what is now Corbett State Park was a popular stopping place on the pioneer wagon road that crossed the Cascade Range near Santiam Pass. Pioneer travelers liked the site because it offered fresh water and good grazing for their draft animals. In the early 20th century, the meadow was also used by sheepherders who grazed their flocks in the eastern foothills of the Cascades.

The Oregon Parks and Recreation Department acquired property in 1952. The land was a gift to the people of Oregon from Henry L. Corbett and his wife, Gretchen. It honors their son, Elliott R. Corbett II, who was killed in action during World War II. Elliot Corbett was an infantryman in the United States Army, serving in the European Theatre when he was killed on 19 November 1944 at the age of 22. He is buried at the United States Military Cemetery at Margraten, Netherlands. The Corbett family’s gift of the park was made on condition that the land remain a wilderness area.

In August 2003, the area around Blue Lake was burned by the B&B Complex Fires, including most of Corbett State Park. Within a year, the forest began to recover from the fire. Today, Corbett State Park and the surrounding forest is still recovering.

== Wilderness ==
Corbett State Park is a 63-acre (25 ha) day-use wilderness preserve. The park's central feature is a large open meadow surrounded by ponderosa and lodgepole pine. The park also includes riparian habitat along two seasonal drainages.

While the park is relatively small, it provides habitat for a wide range of wildlife. The mixed conifer forest on the slopes above Blue Lake is home to a number of mammal species, including mule deer, black-tailed deer, black bear, badgers, bobcats, and cougars. Some of the small mammals found in the park include chipmunks, ground squirrels, shrews, and voles.

Among the birds found in or near the park are:

- Mountain chickadees
- Red-breasted nuthatches
- Brown creeper
- Dark-eyed juncos
- Western tanagers
- Chipping sparrows
- Red crossbills
- Golden-crowned kinglets
- Ruby-crowned kinglet
- and Steller's jays.

The forest is also home to northern flickers, western wood-pewee, olive-sided flycatcher, Hammond's flycatcher, American dusky flycatcher, brown-headed cowbird, and pine siskin. Pileated woodpeckers and hairy woodpeckers have been abundant in the forest around the park since the 1990s when the spruce budworm infestation increased the insect population they feed on. Blue Lake and nearby Suttle Lake attract birds of prey such as red-tailed hawk, osprey and bald eagles as well as vultures. Both the osprey and eagles normally stay well into the fall to feed on brown trout and kokanee salmon that spawn in Link Creek, between Blue and Suttle lakes.

== Recreation ==
Corbett State Park offers a variety of wilderness experiences. The most common recreational activities are hiking, mountain biking, and horseback riding. Park visitors can fish in Blue Lake, but access is difficult due to the steep crater walls. Kokanee salmon are also found in the lake. However, the lakes shore is steep and can be hard to traverse with fishing gear.

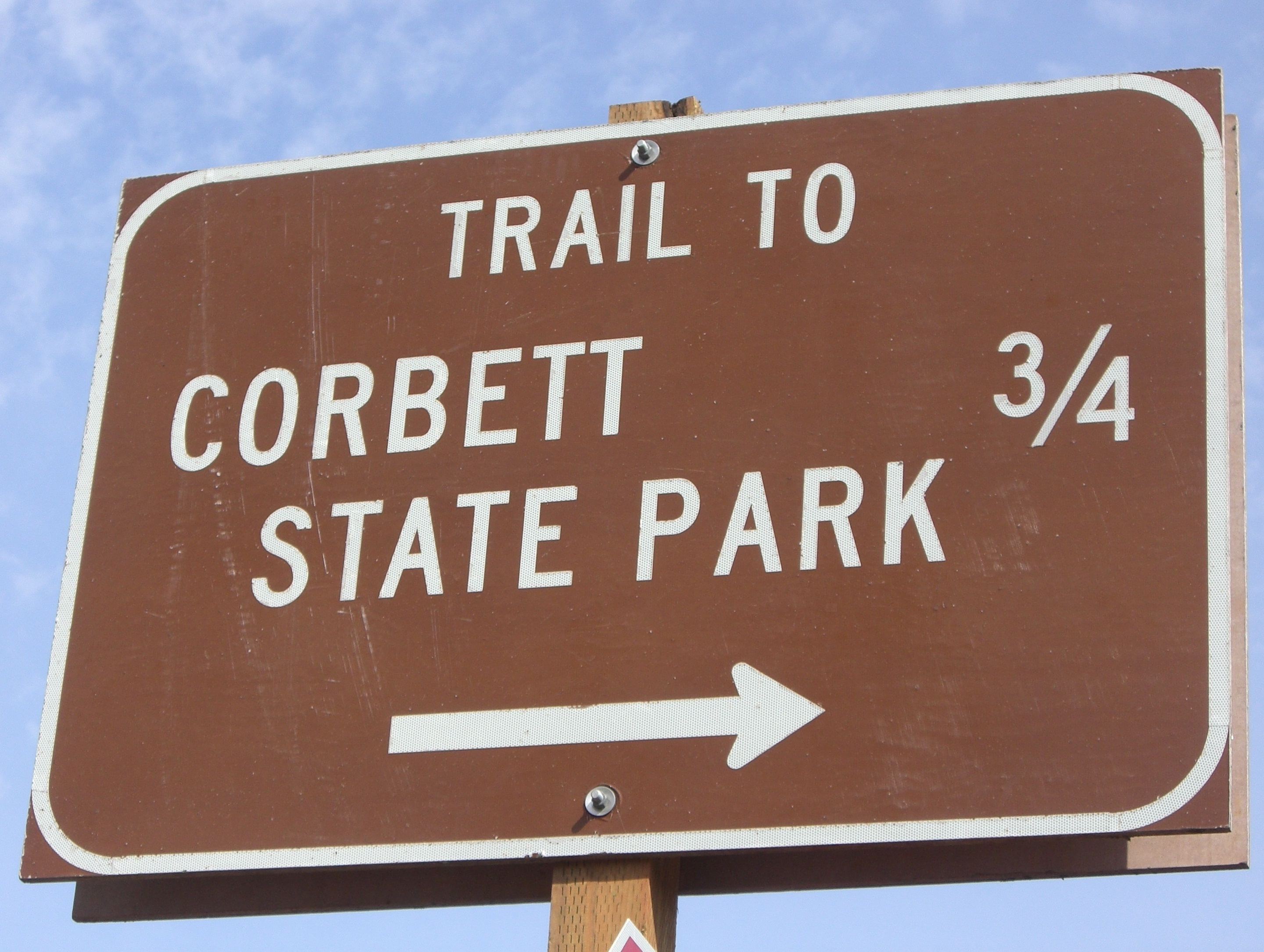
Sign pointing to Corbett State Park trailhead

Because there is no road access to the park, visitors must hike into the area. From the west, the Corbett Park trail begins at a small parking area along Forest Service Road 2076, 3/4 mile (1.2 km) south of Highway 20. From the trailhead, visitors hike 2 miles (3.2 km) east through the Deschutes National Forest to the park’s main meadow. From the east, the park trail begins at Camp Caldera. From the camp, visitors can reach the park by hiking along the Blue Lake Crater Rim Trail that circles the lake. However, the trail along the east side of the lake is private property.. The entire loop trail around the lake is approximately 2.5-mile (4.0 km). One can also hike the waterfall loop trail on the south side of the park. The trail leaves the meadow about fifty yards west of the creek. Run south to the falls and then curves north back towards the meadow and Dark Lake trail.

During the winter months, Corbett State Park is a site for cross-country skiing and snowshoeing. The ban on motorized vehicles applies all year, so snowmobiles are not allowed in park.

Because Corbett State Park is only accessible by trail, it has relatively few visitors. There is no charge for using the park. However, park facilities are very limited. Potable water and toilets are not provided for visitors. Signage within the park is also very limited. This is designed to enhance the park's wilderness experience.

== See also ==
- List of Oregon state parks
