= Blue Lake Crater =

Volcanic crater in Oregon, United States

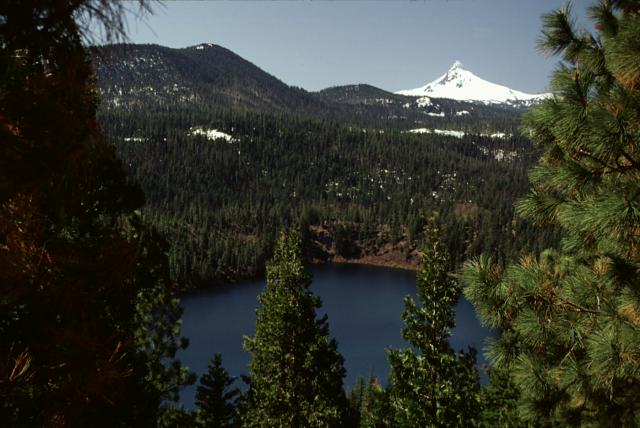
- Blue Lake Crater (prior to the B&B Complex fires in summer 2003)
- Floor elevation: 3,461 ft (1,055 m)

Geology
- Type: Maar
- Age: Holocene

Geography
- Location: Jefferson County, Oregon, USA
- Coordinates: 44°24′45″N 121°46′11″W
- Topo map: USGS Three Fingered Jack
- Interactive map of Blue Lake Crater

Blue Lake Crater (also known as Blue Lake Maar) is a maar, or a broad, low-relief volcanic crater, in the U.S. state of Oregon. Located in Jefferson County, it consists of three overlapping craters, which hold Blue Lake. The drainage basin for Blue Lake has very steep, forested slopes and is mostly part of the explosion crater left by the volcano's eruption. The volcano lies within the Metolius River basin, which supports a wide array of plant life, large and small mammals, and more than 80 bird species. A 2009 Oregon law designated the Metolius River basin as an area of critical concern, preventing large-scale development and protecting wildlife.

Despite having erupted at some point within the past 4,000 years, Blue Lake Crater is considered one of the least-known Holocene volcanoes in the Cascade volcanic arc. It forms a modest volcanic cone, its lake surrounded by a crescent-shaped, agglutinate ridge consisting of volcanic bombs. The northern side of Blue Lake Crater's rim collapsed during eruptive activity, while the southern wall remains intact. The overall composition is mafic (rich in magnesium and iron), chiefly basalt and picrite basalt (picrobasalt). Other associated volcanic features include a chain of spatter cones about 3.7 miles (6.0 km) to the south, which erupted material that shares petrographic qualities with erupted material from Blue Lake Crater. Geologists disagree on the exact date of Blue Lake Crater's most recent activity; W. E. Scott and E. M. Taylor place the eruption at 3,440 ± 250 years ago, while more recent publications estimate that date as the maximum age and suggest it is more likely the eruption occurred about 1,330 ± 140 years ago. The United States Geological Survey has assessed the threat potential from Blue Lake Crater as "Low/Very Low."

Part of the Elliott Corbett Memorial State Recreation Site, Blue Lake Crater supports an arts center named Caldera, as well as a resort. There is a campground on nearby Suttle Lake, and Blue Lake is used for fishing. The surroundings support hiking and horseback riding. The discontinuity of publicly accessible land has made the Blue Lake area little-known as a recreation destination, though a round-trip on the public trails runs for more than 2 miles (3.2 km), beginning with a scramble.

== Geography ==
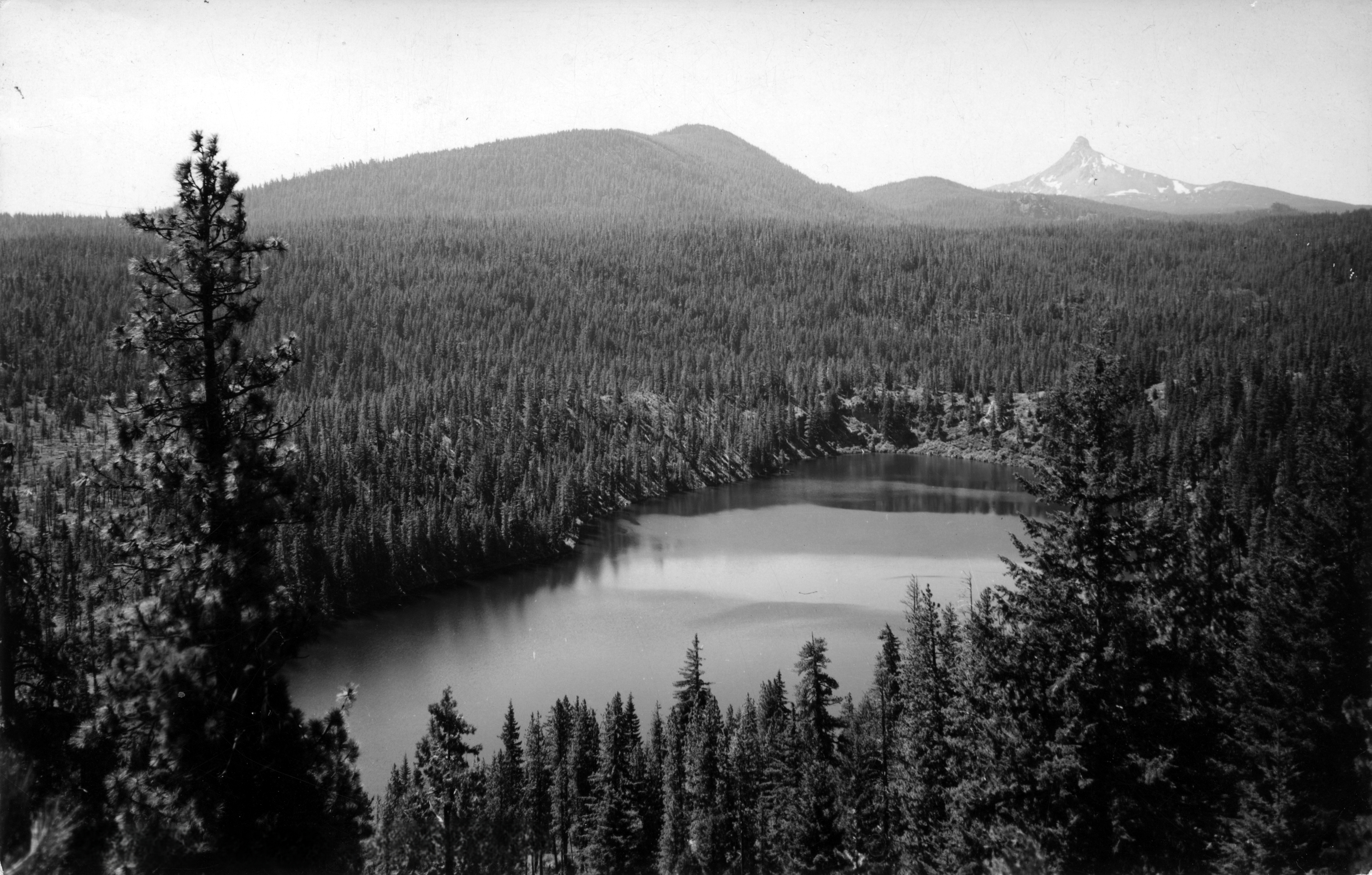
Blue Lake in 1940

Blue Lake Crater is located in Jefferson County, in the U.S. state of Oregon. The elevation of the lake at the bottom of the crater is 3,461 feet (1,055 m), while the elevation at the rim is 4,035 feet (1,230 m).

The geological feature consists of three overlapping craters, which are filled by the waters of Blue Lake, often called "the Crater Lake of the Central Oregon Cascades." With an area of 60.4 acres (0.244 km^{2}), Blue Lake has dimensions of 0.19 by 0.50 miles (0.3 by 0.8 km), with a depth of more than 300 feet (90 m). It has a shoreline length of 1.5 miles (2.4 km). The lake has a cold temperature at 36.5 °F (2.5 °C) below depths of 33 feet (10 m) and low productivity (the rate of generation of biomass in an ecosystem). Blue Lake's depth gives it its eponymous blue color, which the Atlas of Oregon Lakes describes as "the bluest of the many Blue Lakes in Oregon." Blue Lake also has a strange water chemistry, with samples collected in October 1972 by the Oregon Department of Environmental Quality showing increased conductivity owing to high concentrations of sodium and chloride ions, possibly as a result of inflow from hot springs.

The drainage basin for Blue Lake has very steep, forested slopes and is mostly part of the crater left by the volcano's eruption. About three percent of the water's surface area has a depth of less than 10 feet (3.0 m). The lake is fed by underground springs near the Southern shore, snowmelt from its surroundings, and a stream from the northwest. One outlet, Link Stream, runs through the eastern crater wall for 0.5 miles (0.80 km) to the nearby Suttle Lake, a moraine-dammed lake that is popular among tourists, which is warmer and eutrophic. Near Blue Lake lie terminal moraines from an ice sheet between Mount Washington and Three Fingered Jack, which are covered with 0.5 to 1 foot (0.15 to 0.30 m) of volcanic ash deposited by cinder cones in the Sand Mountain Volcanic Field and about 1 foot (0.30 m) of cinders produced by Blue Lake Crater.

== Ecology ==
Blue Lake always exhibits an extremely high concentration of phosphorus, which is normally associated with eutrophic lakes, but Blue Lake is distinctly oligotrophic, with small phytoplankton populations. There are also rainbow trout (stocked annually) and kokanee in the lake. There were historically sockeye salmon runs in the lake and adjoining water systems, which ceased with the construction of the Pelton Dam on the Deschutes River in the 1960s. There are ongoing efforts to restore anadromous fish to the waterway. Forest fires have badly damaged much of the forested area near Blue Lake Crater.

Blue Lake is part of the Metolius River basin. The river passes through old-growth, ponderosa pine forests, as well as forests of Douglas fir and western larch. In May of each year, native plants and wildflowers start to appear, including early blue violets, larkspur, serviceberry, Sitka valerian, and western buttercups. During the summer season, river trails more prominently display plant species like arrowleaf balsamroot, American brooklime, bigleaf lupine, Douglas's spirea, Indian paintbrush, and monkeyflower plants. Wildflowers sometimes form on islands in the river, as their seeds bloom after falling into the water and accumulating over time. The area is also noted for a rare species of Penstemon known as Penstemon peckii, a wildflower that grows in 7 different colors, which is endemic to the Sisters area. Other plants that live within the Metolius Preserve include incense cedar trees, nutka rose, ocean spray, snowberry, and vine maple trees.

More than 80 species of bird inhabit the Metolius Preserve area such as the white-headed woodpecker. The area supports large mammals like American black bears, badgers, bobcats, beavers, deer, cougars, elk, and otters, as well as smaller mammals like northern flying squirrels, shrews, and voles.

== Geology ==
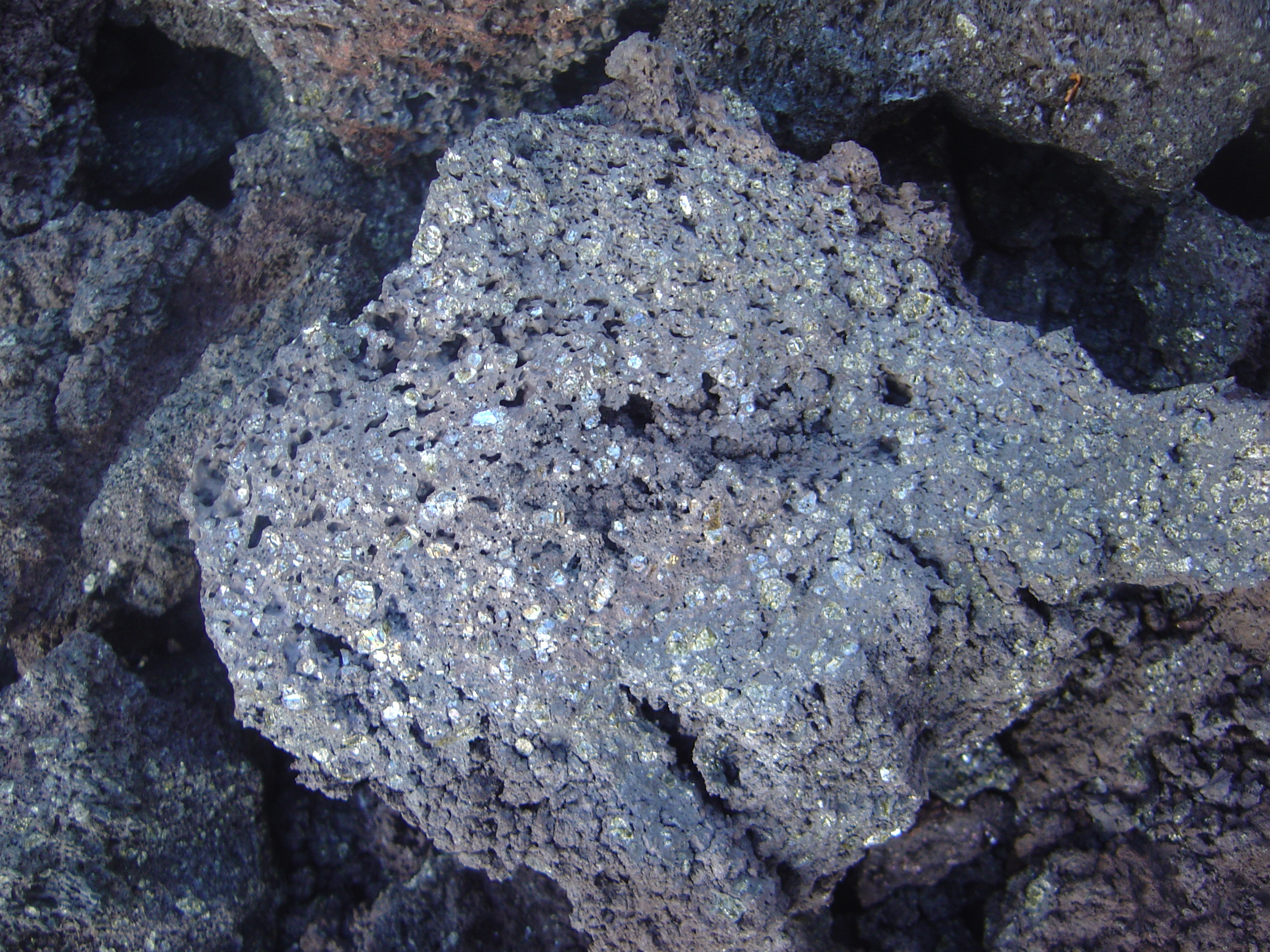
Blue Lake crater is made up of basalt and picrite basalt, or picrobasalt (representative sample pictured)

Blue Lake Crater is part of the Oregon branch of the Cascade volcanic arc in western North America, though it lies about 3 miles (4.8 km) to the east of the major crest. Despite being located close to a major highway that crosses the Cascades, Blue Lake Crater is considered one of the least-known Holocene volcanoes in the Cascade arc. It fits into a greater geographic trend that includes Belknap Crater, the Cinder Pit volcano to the north, and a chain of spatter cones to the south, which may indicate an underlying fault system or fractures.

Blue Lake Crater is considered a Holocene maar (a broad, low-relief volcanic crater) with at least three overlapping explosion craters, which trend to the northeast. There is a crescent-shaped, agglutinate ridge consisting of volcanic bombs surrounding the crater, which reaches heights of 300 feet (91 m) above the lake surface and 150 feet (46 m) above surrounding topographic features. Some of the volcanic bombs on the outer slopes of Blue Lake Crater reach lengths of 6 feet (1.8 m); many of the inner slopes lead to cliffs. The northern wall of the crater appears to have collapsed during an eruption, while the southern wall is intact and made of cinder and a matrix of bedrock and volcanic bombs. Overall, Blue Lake Crater has a modest volcanic cone.

In contrast to many maars, Blue Lake Crater has vesicular scoria with little evidence of extensive interaction with external water. Its eruption less than 3,000 years ago makes Blue Lake Crater one of the youngest volcanoes in the Cascade Range, and with the spatter cone chain nearby, it may also be the newest volcanic feature in the Santiam and McKenzie Passes region. The maar forms part of the Sisters Reach, which extends for 56 miles (90 km) and contains at least 466 Quaternary volcanoes. The reach is characterized by aligned vents and a high vent density, with a number of eruptive units containing rhyolite, which is rare for the Cascade arc.

Blue Lake Crater has a mafic composition (rich in magnesium and iron). Blue Lake Crater's major rock composition components are basalt and picrite basalt (picrobasalt). Analysis of components from Blue Lake Crater eruptive deposits for calc-alkaline melt inclusion showed compositional similarities with the Yapoah and Collier cones, indicating that Blue Lake Crater is also made up of basaltic andesite. By weight percentage, Blue Lake Crater deposits consist of about 54% Silicon dioxide (silica) and about 5% magnesium oxide. It has a phosphorus pentoxide to potassium oxide ratio between 0.2 and 0.3, which is an indicator for distinguishing distinct magma types as the two chemical compounds act as incompatible elements except for late-stage crystallization.

=== Subfeatures ===
There is a chain of spatter cones about 3.7 miles (6 km) south of the Blue Lake Crater, which display a similar alignment north–northeast for 0.93 miles (1.5 km). The chain runs for 1 mile (1.6 km) in length between Blue Lake Crater and Mount Washington and lies south of another vent with a circular crater that is 10-foot (3.0 m) deep, which likely only erupted gas. Their eruption products show petrographic similarities to Blue Lake eruptive material, suggesting that their eruptive activity overlapped in time. Erupted tephra from both is moderately porphyritic with 1 percent olivine phenocrysts about 0.039 inches (1 mm) across and 10–15 percent plagioclase phenocrysts that are slightly larger at up to 0.12 inches (3 mm) across. None of the spatter cones erupted lava flows. Trenches run parallel to the midsection of the spatter cone chain, suggesting underground continuity. There are segments of fractured bedrock in the area but no displacement is visible. There are three fissures associated with the spatter cone chain; the southern and middle fissures are nearly connected, with furrows lined with lithic tephra.

Cinder Pit is a small cinder cone, located 1.5 miles (2.4 km) north of Blue Lake Crater, which is now occupied by a basalt volcanic plug. A narrow lava flow sits a few hundred feet to the east of Cinder Pit, sitting on top of oxidized glacial deposits. Another two cinder cones are located nearby, with heights of 250 feet (76 m) and 350 feet (110 m) above the northern and northeastern flanks of the Black Crater volcano, respectively. Another line of volcanic vents lies to the south.

== Eruptive history ==
Volcanic activity in the Santiam Pass and McKenzie Pass has included eruptions of basalt and basaltic andesite lava flows from cinder cones and shield volcanoes. Most of these events occurred within the past 7,650 years after the deposition of Mazama Ash, yielding lava flows with rugged surfaces, unlike the more ancient, glaciated lava deposits that preceded them. Ash from these eruptions is also present. Three regional pulses of eruptive activity took place: the first from 4,000 to 3,000 years ago, the second from 2,900 to 2,500 years ago, and the third from 2,000 to 1,300 years ago. Age progression is not clearly related to geographic distribution, though Blue Lake Crater and the spatter cone chain nearby mark two small eruptive centers in the eastern Santiam Pass area.

Blue Lake Crater erupted at some point within the past 4,000 years. The maximum age, determined by Taylor (1965), was 3,440 ± 250 years for a tree limb between Blue Lake Crater tephra deposits and volcanic ash from Sand Mountain Volcanic Field. Scott (1977) also concludes that the evidence suggests the eruption took place 3,440 ± 250 years ago. Charred forest litter was found under cinders from the spatter cone chain near Blue Lake Crater and used to determine a minimum age of 1,330 ± 140 years. Sherrod et al. (2004) argue that the charred limb was likely from a tree killed by eruptions from the Sand Mountain Field rather than Blue Lake Crater, and thus that the date of 3,440 years ago should be treated as a maximum limiting age for Blue Lake Crater instead. Cashman et al. (2009) argue that the identification of a 0.39 inches (1 cm) ash layer from a core from Round Lake (located 2.2 miles (3.6 km) northwest of Blue Lake), which shows geochemical similarities to Blue Lake Crater tephra, suggests the minimum age of Blue Lake Crater is even younger, at 1,860 ± 25 years. However, McKay (2012) shows that there is a strong chemical correlation between this layer and tephra from Blue Lake Crater as well as the Collier Cone volcano.

Blue Lake Crater's eruption violently broke through bedrock layers, producing basaltic volcanic bombs and cinders as well as a blanket of tephra that was deposited to the east and southeast, reaching a maximum thickness of more than 16 feet (5 m). It likely formed an eruption column of tephra, which was deflected by wind and then reached Suttle Lake, forming a deposit with a thickness greater than 7 feet (2.1 m) on its southwestern shore. Eruptive products consisted of scoria, black volcanic ash, and lapilli, with lapillisized scoria dominating. Scoria from the eruption had a coarse texture. Possibly the most recent eruption in the Santiam and McKenzie Passes region, this event formed an elongated crater with steep walls but a low rim. There were no lava flows.

The eruption was one of several postglacial mafic events in the area, which are more common in the Sisters Reach than anywhere in the Cascade arc. It was part of a pulse of more than a dozen mafic eruptions during the late Holocene epoch in the McKenzie and Santiam Passes region between 4,500 and 1,100 years ago.

Isopach mapping of the deposits from Blue Lake Crater suggest an eruptive volume of 1.4×10^{9} cubic feet (40,000,000 m^{3}). The eruption was predominantly fed by magma and produced thick scoria fall, which overlies phreatomagmatic surge deposits with thicknesses up to 12 inches (30 cm). The grain size for the pyroclastic deposits is finest in the base surge deposits, increasing as it moves away from the base. Lithic and dense clast fragments are most common near the base of the deposit, with vesicular scoria upsection. The transition from a glassier matrix in early-stage eruptive material to a more microcrystalline character indicates that there was quenching of early-stage deposits with external water. This possibly suggests that the eruption began with phreatomagnetic activity but quickly became predominantly magmatic for the rest of its duration. Further evidence for a deep, magmatic source includes high volatile content of olivine-hosted melt inclusions, additional melt inclusion data with abundant water and carbon dioxide, absence of lithic fragments except late-stage volcanic bombs, and the absence of lava flow deposits.

=== Current threat ===
No lava flows have been recently emplaced in the area surrounding Blue Lake Crater. The area near Blue Lake Crater is not heavily populated, though as of 2013 there were about 6,900 people living within 19 miles (30 km) of the maar and more than 286,000 people living within 62 miles (100 km). According to the Volcano Hazards Program of the USGS, the threat potential for Blue Lake Crater is "Low/Very Low." J.W. Ewert of the USGS (2007) assessed the volcano's hazard level using a fifteen factor method and likewise determined the volcano's threat level to be "Low."

== Human history and recreation ==
Blue Lake Crater is part of the Elliott Corbett Memorial State Recreation Site, named after a 22-year-old soldier who perished in November 1944 during World War II. He was one of 107 soldiers from Oregon buried in the Netherlands American Cemetery near the village of Margraten.

The Cinder Pit volcano 1.5 miles (2.4 km) north of Blue Lake Crater was historically excavated for road metal. There was a drilling site near Santiam Pass about 6.2 miles (10 km) to the west of Blue Lake Crater.

The Caldera arts center is located on Blue Lake, and there is a resort and campground on nearby Suttle Lake. Located at 3,500 feet (1,100 m) above sea level, the arts center is 16 miles (26 km) to the west of the city of Sisters and encompasses 116 acres (0.47 km^{2}) surrounded by the Deschutes National Forest.

There are a number of organizations dedicated to preserving the recreational area in the Metolius River basin, including the non-profits Metolius River Association and Friends of the Metolius. The Metolius Preserve area, operated by the Deschutes Land Trust, aims to protect habitat for fish, plant, and animal wildlife, including by preserving the Lake Creek waterway to sustain habitat for redband trout and nesting songbirds and reintroduce spring chinook salmon and sockeye salmon to the Deschutes River basin. In 2009, the Oregon legislature passed the Metolius Protection Act, designating 448 acres of the river basin as an "Area of Critical State Concern (ACSC)", preventing large-scale development on the land and protecting its wildlife.

The area near Blue Lake and Suttle Lake is used for recreation. Fishing in the lake is best during warm months of the year given the lake's depth. There are a number of campgrounds in the area managed by the United States Forest Service, with one on Blue Lake. There are hiking and horseback riding trails on the lake shoreline, though about half of the shoreline property is privately owned, including some land owned by the private resort. Land parcels are discontinuously public and private; Blue Lake's southern and western shores form part of the Elliott Corbett Memorial State Recreation Site. The discontinuity of publicly accessible land has made the area somewhat esoteric as a recreation destination, though a round-trip on the public trails runs for more than 2 miles (3.2 km), beginning with a scramble up a very steep cinder slope.

== Sources ==
- Cashman, K. V.; Deligne, N. I.; Gannett, M. W.; Grant, G. E.; Jefferson, A. (2009). "Fire and water: volcanology, geomorphology, and hydrogeology of the Cascade Range, central Oregon". In O'Connor, J. E.; Dorsey, R. J.; Madin, I. (eds.). Volcanoes to Vineyards: Geologic Field Trips Through the Dynamic Landscape of the Pacific Northwest. Geological Society of America. pp. 555–598. doi:10.1130/2009.fld015(26). ISBN 978-0-8137-0015-1. OCLC 436221159. Field Guide 15. Archived from the original on 2019-03-26.
- Ewert, J. W. (November 2007). "System for Ranking Relative Threats of U.S. Volcanoes". Natural Hazards Review. 8 (4). American Society of Civil Engineers: 112–124. doi:10.1061/(ASCE)1527-6988(2007)8:4(112). Archived from the original on 2019-03-28.
- Hildreth, W. (2007). Quaternary magmatism in the Cascades: geologic perspectives. United States Geological Survey. ISBN 978-1-4113-1945-5. ISSN 1044-9612. Professional Paper 1744. Archived from the original on 2019-03-25.
- Hill, B. E.; Priest, G. R. (1992), Hill, B. E. (ed.), "Geologic setting of the Santiam Pass area, central Cascade Range, Oregon", Geology and geothermal resources of the Santiam Pass area of the Oregon Cascade Range, Deschutes, Jefferson, and Linn Counties, Oregon, Oregon Department of Geology and Mineral Industries, pp. 5–18, Open-File Report O-92-3, archived from the original on 2021-01-31.
- Jensen, R. A. (2009), "A field guide to Newberry Volcano, Oregon" (PDF), A field guide to Newberry Volcano, Oregon; The Geological Society of America, Field Guide 15, pp. 53–79, doi:10.1130/2009.fld015(03), ISBN 978-0-8137-0015-1, archived (PDF) from the original on 2019-01-17.
- Johnson, E. R. (December 2016). "Fluctuating Eruption Style at Blue Lake Crater, Central Oregon Cascades: Insights from Deposit Granulometry and Componentry and Pyroclast Textures". AGU Fall Meeting Abstracts. 2016. American Geophysical Union: V43E–3192. Bibcode:2016AGUFM.V43E3192J. V43E-3192.
- McKay, D. (2012). Recent Mafic Eruptions at Newberry Volcano and in the Central Oregon Cascades: Physical Volcanology and Implications for Hazards (Thesis). University of Oregon. OCLC 820687284. Archived from the original on 2019-03-28.
- Ruscitto, D. M.; Wallace, P. J.; Johnson, E. R.; Kent, A. J. R.; Bindeman, I. N. (September 2010). "Volatile contents of mafic magmas from cinder cones in the Central Oregon High Cascades: Implications for magma formation and mantle conditions in a hot arc". Earth and Planetary Science Letters. 298 (1–2). Elsevier: 153–161. Bibcode:2010E&PSL.298..153R. doi:10.1016/j.epsl.2010.07.037.
- Scott, W. E. (January 1, 1977). "Quaternary glaciation and volcanism, Metolius River area, Oregon". Geological Society of America Bulletin. 88 (1). Geological Society of America: 113–124. Bibcode:1977GSAB...88..113S. doi:10.1130/0016-7606(1977)88<113:QGAVMR>2.0.CO;2. ISSN 1943-2674.
- Sherrod, D. R.; Taylor, E. M.; Ferns, M. L.; Scott, W. E.; Conrey, R. M.; Smith, G. A. (2004). "Geologic Map of the Bend 30-×60-Minute Quadrangle, Central Oregon" (PDF). Geologic Investigations Series I–2683. Archived (PDF) from the original on 2019-03-25.
- Taylor, E. M. (1981), "Road log for central High Cascade geology, Bend, Sisters, McKenzie Pass, and Santiam Pass, Oregon" (PDF), in Johnson, D. A.; Donnelly-Nolan, J. (eds.), Guides to some Volcanic Terranes in Washington, Idaho, Oregon, and Northern California, United States Geological Survey, pp. 59–83, Geological Survey Circular 838, archived (PDF) from the original on 2020-06-21.
- Taylor, E. M. (1968). "Roadside geology, Santiam and McKenzie Pass Highways, Oregon" (PDF). In Dole, H. M. (ed.). Andesite Conference Guidebook. Oregon Department of Geology and Mineral Industries. pp. 3–33. Oregon Department of Geology and Mineral Industries Bulletin 62. Archived (PDF) from the original on 2020-10-20.
- Taylor, E. M. (July 1965). "Recent volcanism between Three Fingered Jack and North Sister, Oregon Cascade Range". Ore Bin. 27 (7). Oregon Department of Geology and Mineral Industries: 121–147.
