= Suttle Lake (Oregon) =

Lake in Oregon, United States of America

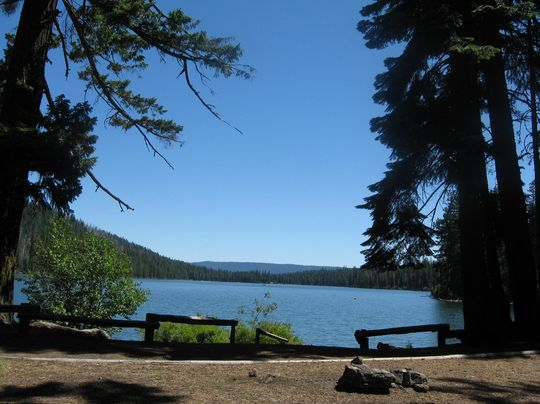
- Suttle Lake viewed from Link Creek camp

- Location within Oregon Location within the United States
- Location: Deschutes National Forest, Oregon
- Coordinates: 44.422°N 121.740°W
- Type: Natural
- Primary inflows: Link Creek
- Primary outflows: Lake Creek
- Catchment area: 21.3 square miles (55 km^{2})
- Max. length: 1.4 mi (2.3 km)
- Max. width: 0.4 mi (0.64 km)
- Surface area: 253 acres (102 ha)
- Average depth: 44 ft (13 m)
- Max. depth: 75 ft (23 m)
- Shore length^{1}: 3.6 mi (5.8 km)
- Surface elevation: 3,438 ft (1,048 m)
- ^{1} Shore length is not a well-defined measure.

Suttle Lake is a natural lake near the crest of the Cascade Range in central Oregon, United States, covering 253 acres (1.02 km^{2}). It was named in honor of John Settle, whose name was misspelled when the lake was officially recorded as a geographic feature. Today, the lake is located within the Deschutes National Forest and serves as one of central Oregon's most popular outdoor recreation sites, with three large campgrounds and two day-use areas along the north, west, and south shores of the lake. The Oregon Department of Fish and Wildlife regularly stocks the lake with rainbow trout.

== History ==
Native Americans occupied the areas around Suttle Lake for perhaps 10,000 years before the first European pioneer found the lake and recorded its location. For centuries, Native Americans used trails over Santiam Pass to transit from the Willamette Valley to central Oregon. Suttle Lake offered a place to camp, fish, and gather berries just east of the summit.

Suttle Lake was named in honor of John Settle, an American pioneer who settled in the Lebanon area of the Willamette Valley. Settle was an organizer and one of the principal investors in the Willamette Valley and Cascade Mountain Military Wagon Road, which was built in the mid-1860s, and also supervised some of the road construction. Settle found the lake that now bears his name in 1866 while on a hunting trip. While the lake is named for him, his last name was misspelled as "Suttle" when it was officially recorded.

Suttle Lake became part of the Cascade Range Forest Reserve in 1898. The lake was managed as part of the reserve and then the Cascade National Forest until 1908, when the area was transferred to the newly formed Deschutes National Forest.

In the 1920s, the United States Forest Service allowed some development at the lake, issuing special use permits for a Methodist-sponsored summer camp, a lodge, and some small cabins. The Forest Service also built three public campgrounds along the lake shore. Today, Suttle Lake and the surrounding forest are part of the Sisters Ranger District, an administrative sub-division of the Deschutes National Forest. The lake's fishery is managed by the Oregon Department of Fish and Wildlife.

== Watershed ==
Suttle Lake is located on the east side of the Cascade Range in central Oregon, 5 miles (8.0 km) east of Santiam Pass. Most of the lake water comes from groundwater seepage. Link Creek is the only year-round tributary flowing into the lake. It drains into the west end of the lake, with water from Blue Lake. The lake's only outlet is Lake Creek, which begins at the east end of the lake, eventually flowing into the Metolius River near Camp Sherman, Oregon.

The watershed that drains into Suttle Lake covers 21.3 square miles (55 km^{2}). The watershed is covered by a mixed conifer forest that receives an average of 54 inches (1,400 mm) to 80 inches (2,000 mm) of precipitation annually. The primary tree species in the watershed are ponderosa pine, lodgepole pine, and jack pine along with Douglas-fir and other fir species. As a result, the watershed is normally covered by a dense forest canopy. However, a western spruce budworm infestation reached epidemic levels in 1993, defoliating large areas of the Suttle Lake watershed. In 2003, the forest around the lake was burned by the B&B Complex Fires.

== Environment ==
Suttle Lake is the result of glaciation during the Pleistocene Epoch, when the Cascade Mountains were buried in ice. A glacier carved out a deep valley leaving a lateral moraine where it stopped. Over time, the moraine trapped water creating the lake. Today, Suttle Lake occupies a long, narrow valley with relatively steep slopes to the north and south.

Suttle Lake is a natural lake that covers 253 acres (1.02 km^{2}). It is approximately 1.4 miles (2.3 km) long and 0.4 miles (0.64 km) wide. The lake has an average depth of 44 feet (13 m) with a maximum depth of 75 feet (23 m). The lake's bottom is composed of sand, gravel and rock with detritus and sediment in some of the deeper areas. The littoral areas near the shore line are mostly gravel and rock.

Under natural conditions Suttle Lake would probably be classified mesotrophic. However, the lake's current trophic state is eutrophic. During the area's long winter season, the lake may return to a mesotrophic condition. The water chemistry is normal except for a relatively high concentration of phosphorus that promotes the growth of planktonic algae. There is aquatic plant life found along the periphery of the lake in a narrow zone down to a depth of about 20 feet (6.1 m). However, most of the lake is too deep for macrophyte growth.

There have been a number of studies looking at the lake's environment and water quality. The studies have found the water transparency is reasonably good, but has slowly declined in recent decades due to recreational activities in the area. In 1940, researchers measured a Secchi disk depth of 35 feet (11 m). Studies in the early 1970s found Secchi clarity ranging from 14 feet (4.3 m) to 16 feet (4.9 m). In 1982, another Secchi measurement showed clarity had improved to 22 feet (6.7 m).

== Ecology ==
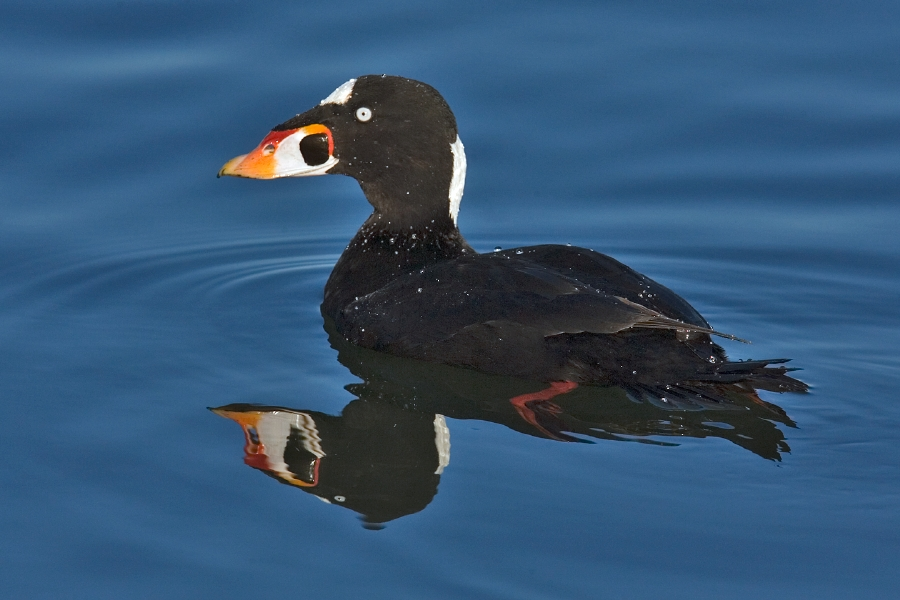
A male surf scoter

The Oregon Department of Fish and Wildlife manages the Suttle Lake fishery. The lake's fish population includes rainbow trout, brown trout, kokanee salmon, and mountain whitefish. Much of the population is self-sustaining. However, the Department of Fish and Wildlife regularly stocks the lake with rainbow trout to maintain a balance of fish populations. The brown trout and kokanee salmon are particularly sought after by anglers. The lake's brown trout can weigh up to 10 pounds (4.5 kg). Brown trout weighing 3 pounds (1.4 kg) to 5 pounds (2.3 kg) are relatively common. The kokanee salmon average 9 inches (230 mm) to 10 inches (250 mm). The mountain whitefish average 10 inches (250 mm) to 12 inches (300 mm).

In addition to fish, the lake provides habitat for a wide variety of bird species. From the Forest Service campgrounds along the lake shore, birdwatchers can view waterfowl, songbirds, and birds of prey. Common waterfowl include red-necked grebes, Pacific loons, common loons, hooded mergansers, red-breasted mergansers, lesser scaup, surf scoters, white-winged scoters, common goldeneyes, and Barrow's goldeneyes. The lake also attracts birds of prey such as red-tailed hawk, osprey and bald eagles. Both the osprey and eagles normally stay well into the fall to feed on brown trout and kokanee salmon that spawn in Link Creek, between Suttle and Blue lakes.

In the forest around the lake, there are large numbers of northern flickers, American robins, hermit thrushes, mountain chickadees, dark-eyed juncos, western tanagers, red-breasted nuthatches, yellow-rumped warblers, chipping sparrows, song sparrows, red crossbills, golden-crowned kinglets, ruby-crowned kinglet, Townsend's solitaire, and Steller's jays. The forest is also home to western wood pewee, olive-sided flycatcher, Hammond's flycatcher, American dusky flycatcher, warbling vireo, brown creeper, brown-headed cowbird, and pine siskin. Pileated woodpeckers and hairy woodpeckers have been abundant in the forest around the lake since the 1990s when the spruce budworm infestation increased the insect population they feed on.

Suttle Lake and Lake Creek together host a small population of otters. The mixed conifer forest around the lake is home to numerous mammals, both large and small. The large mammals include mule deer, black-tailed deer, Roosevelt elk, black bear, bobcat, cougar, and possibly also Sasquatch. Some of the small mammals found in the Suttle Lake area include badgers, beavers, northern flying squirrels, shrews, and voles.

== Human development ==
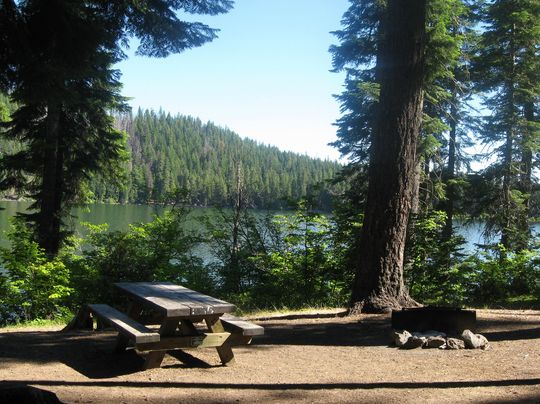
Blue Bay camp site overlooking Suttle Lake

The Forest Service has been actively managing the area around Suttle Lake since the 1920s, when the first special use permits were issued. Over the years, the Forest Service has developed three campgrounds and two day-use areas along the lake shore. All of the campgrounds are located along the south shore of the lake and provide a wide range of camping facilities including camp sites, picnic tables, fire rings, recreational vehicle hook-ups, potable water, restrooms, boat ramps, and fish cleaning stations. The day-use areas have picnic tables, potable water, and restrooms.

Over the years, a series of lodges were built at the lake. The first lodge was constructed in the early 1920s. The second was built in 1931, and a third in 1941. All three lodges were destroyed by fires. The 1941 lodge was renovated in 1974; however, before the remodeled facility re-opened a fire burned the building to the ground. The current lodge, known as The Lodge at Suttle Lake, is located at the east end of the lake, just north of the Lake Creek outlet. It is a 10,000 square feet (930 m^{2}) resort facility built in the Cascadian rustic style. The lodge has ten guest rooms with fireplaces and lake or forest views. The resort also has six cabins including one that was once a Forest Service guard station.

The first summer camp at Suttle Lake was opened in 1921. By the 1940s, the camp was hosting as many as 300 people. To accommodate the campers, Pioneer Lodge was built in 1947. The lodge was located at the east end of the lake south of the Lake Creek outlet. The facility included a large dining hall, meeting rooms, and dormitory space. Twenty cabins were also built at the site. Wesley Meadow Lodge was built in 1981 and a residence for the camp director was added in 1991. Today, Suttle Lake Camp operates year-around, offering 30 Christian education programs.

== Recreation ==
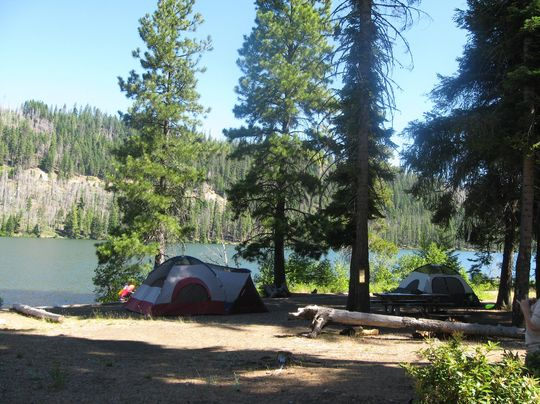
Campers at South Shore campground

Today, Suttle Lake is a very popular recreation site. There are three campgrounds with 96 campsites on the south shore of the lake. Blue Bay campground has 25 campsites; South Shore campground has 38 campsites; and Link Creek campground has 33 campsites plus 3 rental yurts. There are also two day-use areas for swimming and picnicking.

During the summer the lake is a popular place for swimming, fishing, boating, canoeing, kayaking, and water skiing. There are also trails near the lake for hiking, biking, and horseback riding. In the winter, trails around the lake are used for cross-country skiing and snowshoeing. There is also a network of snowmobile trails near the lake. Hoodoo Ski Area is 6 miles (9.7 km) west of Suttle Lake, adding another recreational option for visitors interested in down-hill skiing.

== Location ==
Suttle Lake is located near the crest of the Cascade Mountains in western Jefferson County, Oregon. Its elevation is 3,438 feet (1,048 m) above sea level. The lake is surrounded by the Deschutes National Forest. The lake is 13 miles (21 km) west of Sisters, Oregon and 90 miles (140 km) east of Salem, in the Willamette Valley. Highway 20 runs along the north side of the lake as is climbs a ridge toward Santiam Pass, 5 miles (8.0 km) west of the lake.

== See also ==
- List of lakes in Oregon
