= B&B Complex fires =

2003 pair of wildfires in Oregon

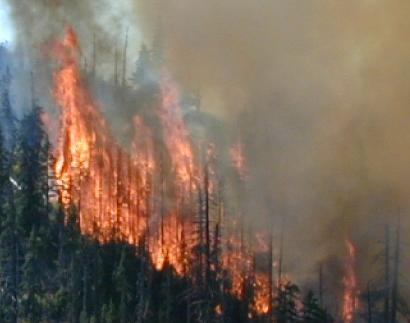
- Date: August 19, 2003 – September 26, 2003
- Location: Cascade Range, Oregon
- Coordinates: 44.63486°N 121.75628°W

Statistics
- Burned area: 90,769 acres (367 km^{2})

Impacts
- Injuries: 8

Ignition
- Cause: Lightning

Map
- Location of fire within Oregon

The B&B Complex fires were a linked pair of wildfires that together burned 90,769 acres (367.33 km^{2}) of Oregon forest during the summer of 2003. The fire complex began as two separate fires, the Bear Butte Fire and the Booth Fire. The two fires were reported on the same day and eventually burned together, forming a single fire area that stretched along the crest of the Cascade Mountains between Mount Jefferson and Mount Washington. On the western side of the Cascades, the fire consumed mostly Douglas-fir and western hemlock. On the eastern side of the mountains, the fire burned mostly Ponderosa pine, lodgepole pine, and jack pine. Most of the burned area was on public land administered by the United States Forest Service including 40,419 acres (163.57 km^{2}) within the Mount Jefferson Wilderness. The fire also burned forest land on the Warm Springs Indian Reservation and small areas of state and private land. Firefighters battled the blaze for 34 days. At the peak of the firefighting effort, there were over 2,300 personnel working on the fire. Although the cost of fire suppression was over $38 million, there were no deaths and no homes burned as the fire was largely in wilderness areas.

== Origin ==
The weather in the central Cascade Mountains in the area where the B&B Complex Fires occurred is highly seasonal and heavily influenced by local topography. In early August 2003, a series of thunderstorms passed over the central Cascades. Lightning strikes were recorded on 4, 5, 6, and 7 August. Over the next several weeks, a number of fires resulted from this lightning activity.

Following the storms in early August, local temperatures in central Oregon ranged from 80 to 90 degrees with relative humidity dropping below 20 percent. During this period, winds were 10 miles per hour (16 km/h) to 20 miles per hour (32 km/h), peaking on 19 August at approximately 30 miles per hour (48 km/h). This combination of hot dry weather and high winds created extreme fire conditions. As a result, creeping fires ignited by the early August lightning storms began to burn more actively. On 15 August a small fire was reported on the Warm Springs Indian Reservation. On 18 August, two more small fires were reported south of Santiam Pass near Hoodoo Ski Area. All three fires were quickly contained.

The B&B Complex Fires occurred in August and September 2003 in the central Cascades, west of Sisters, Oregon. The fire complex began as two separate wildfires; both were caused by lightning striking in early August. The Bear Butte Fire started at the north end of the Mount Jefferson Wilderness area (44.63486°N 121.75628°W), approximately 25 miles (40 km) northwest of Sisters. It was reported by a helicopter crew from Warm Springs on 19 August at 1309 PDT. The Booth Fire started near Henkel Butte (44.42449°N 121.82568°W), about 15 miles (24 km) west of Sisters. It was reported by the Henkel Butte Lookout the same day at 1523 PDT. The next day, the fire suppression efforts on these two fires were consolidated because of their size and proximity, creating the B&B Complex Fires.

== Chronology ==
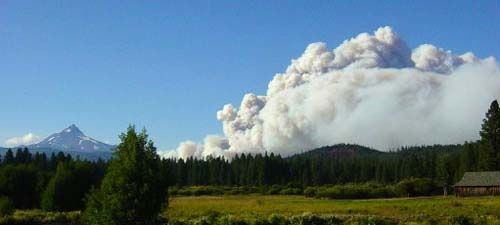
Flare up of Bear Butte Fire on the afternoon of August 19

- On August 19, 2003, two fires were reported in the central Cascades about 15 miles (24 km) apart. The Bear Butte Fire was reported in the Mount Jefferson Wilderness. Heavy winds prevented smoke jumpers from reaching the fire; however, a helicopter dropped water on it throughout the day. By the end of the day, the fire had burned approximately 1,000 acres (4.0 km^{2}) at the north end of the wilderness area and on the southwest side of the Warm Springs Indian Reservation. The Booth Fire was reported near Henkel Butte. During the day, Forest Service crews battled the blaze with hand tools, pumper trucks, and bulldozers. Aerial tankers also dropped retardant on the fire. Due to heavy smoke, U.S. Route 20 was closed between Santiam Pass and the Black Butte Ranch. By the end of the day, the fire had consumed 1,200 acres (4.9 km^{2}), and it was still actively burning north of Route 20. Because the two fires were burning out of control, the Forest Service requested a National Type I Incident Management Team be dispatched to take charge of the fire suppression effort.
- A burn-out operation planned during the night of 19–20 August was cancelled due to high winds. During the night, the Booth Fire jumped Route 20 and began burning on both sides of the highway near Suttle Lake and Blue Lake. As a result, the highway remained closed. The fire also crossed the Pacific Crest Trail heading west. In the early afternoon of August 20, the two fires were joined into a single firefighting effort, becoming the B&B Complex Fires. During the day, the Governor of Oregon invoked the Conflagration Act allowing structural firefighters to be dispatched to Black Butte Ranch, Suttle Lake Camp Ground, Suttle Lake Resort, Camp Tamarack, Blue Lake properties, Santiam Pass Ski Lodge, and Hoodoo Ski Area. These areas were all evacuated except Black Butte Ranch. A Red Cross evacuation shelter was established at the Sisters Elementary School. By the end of the day, the Bear Butte portion of the fire had increased to over 3,000 acres (12 km^{2}) and the Booth Fire area had grown to 3,000 acres (12 km^{2}).

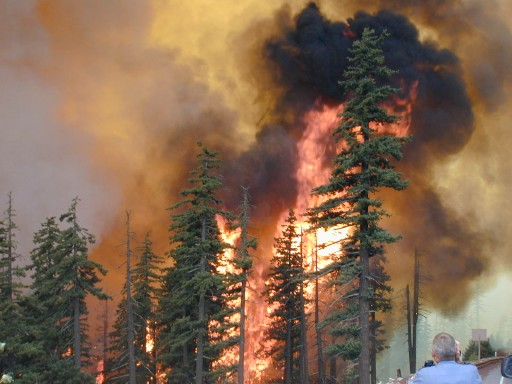
The north side of the Booth Fire on August 21

- On the morning of August 21 at 0600 PDT, the national interagency Incident Management Team officially took charge of the B&B Complex fire operation. By that time, over 1,000 people had been evacuated from the fire area. During the day, Black Butte Ranch was given a precautionary evacuation advisory while the residents of Camp Sherman, Oregon were ordered to evacuate. Approximately 300 people were evacuated from the Camp Sherman area. By the end of the day, there were 862 firefighters working on the fire. This included 24 handcrews, 21 pumper trucks, 2 bulldozers, and 4 helicopters plus 150 management and support personnel. In addition, both President George W. Bush and Oregon Governor Ted Kulongoski visited the fire area on 21 August.
- At the beginning of August 22, the size of the B&B Complex Fires was estimated at 24,000 acres (97 km^{2}). It was burning actively in heavy timber and spreading in multiple directions. The fire area included forest on both sides of the Cascade Mountains, primarily Deschutes National Forest land on the east side of the mountains and Willamette National Forest on the west side. During the day, firefighters concentrated on the fire's eastern and southeastern perimeter because there were structures and communities at risk in those areas. It was announced that Oregon National Guard personnel and equipment were being deployed to the fire. The National Guard assets include three helicopters. During the day, several cabins, an auditorium, and a shower house were destroyed at the Round Lake Christian Camp. Fire crews successfully protected structures at Hoodoo Ski Area and around Suttle Lake as well as Santiam Lodge. By the end of the day, the fire was 4 miles (6.4 km) from Camp Sherman and 3 miles (4.8 km) from Black Butte Ranch.
- On August 23, scattered showers and lower temperatures increased relative humidity. This allowed firefighters to utilize existing forest roads to conduct burn-out operations along the eastern and southeastern perimeter of the fire. Firefighters also performed mop-up operations and patrolled along established fire lines; however, Route 20 remained closed.

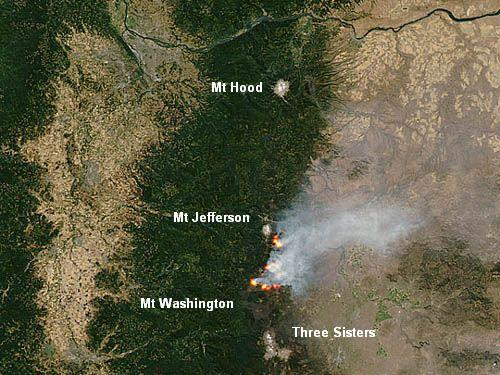
Satellite view of the B&B fires on 24 August

- By August 24, there were 1,422 personnel fighting the fire. This included 32 fire crews, 78 pumper trucks, and 9 helicopters. The fire continued to spread slowly all day. Firefighters completed the fire line on the south flank of the Booth Fire and continued burn-out operations. Fire crews began to mop-up around structures in the Suttle Lake area. Residents of Camp Sherman were permitted to return to their homes for several hours to pick up personal belongings. By the end of the day, the size of the B&B Complex Fires was estimated to be 36,400 acres (147 km^{2}).
- On August 25, both of the B&B fires burned actively as they passed through areas of heavy fuel. During the day, the size of the fire grew to 38,881 acres (157.35 km^{2}). The Bear Butte Fire area continued to spread slowly southward while gusty winds spread the fire more rapidly on its northeast front. The Booth Fire area expanded on the north and northeast flanks, igniting islands of unburned fuel. The fire became active on the south flank drawing firefighters back to Hoodoo and Santiam Pass to protect structures in those areas. The fire also expanded its west perimeter, burning into thick timber near Lost Lake. However, firefighters successfully defended existing lines on the southern and eastern perimeters of the fire. By the end of the day, the interagency incident management team estimated that the fire was 20 percent contained.

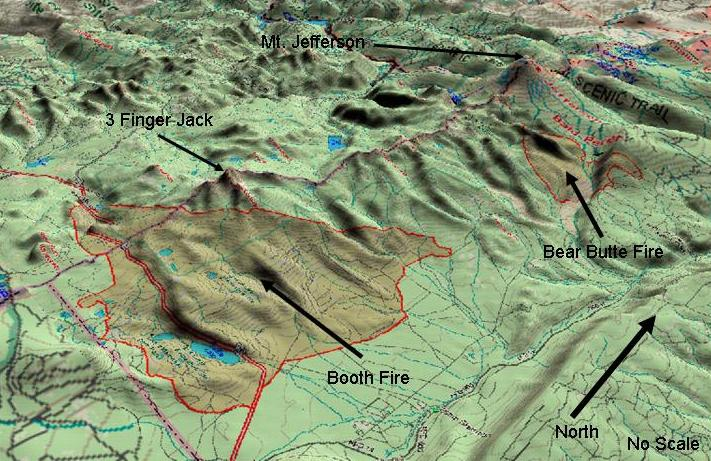
The Booth and Bear Butte fires on 26 August

- On August 26, the B&B fires were active throughout the day. High temperatures and low humidity combined with gusty winds created extremely dangerous fire conditions. The result was numerous spot fires. Firefighters were forced to withdraw from some areas for safety reasons. However, most of the spot fires were contained by the end of the day. The Bear Butte Fire continued to burn in heavy timber. Crews constructed fire lines with hand tools and bulldozers, connecting fire lines to existing roads in an attempt to contain the fire. Due to the remote location, crews were forced to camp near their fire lines. In the Booth Fire area, gusty winds caused spot fires along its northeast perimeter. Fire crews cleared fuels from the path of the fire near Big Lake and worked in conjunction with air support to establish a line around the west end of the fire near Potato Hill.
- On August 27, the B&B Complex Fires continued to burn on the Deschutes and Willamette National Forests and on the Warm Springs Indian Reservation. During the day, there were 2,081 firefighters on scene including 60 hand crews, 75 pumper trucks, and 10 helicopters. Both the Bear Butte and Booth fires were very active with many spot fires and a number of short crowning runs fanned by gusty winds. In the Bear Butte area, the fire continued to burn in thick forest. Crews continued building lines along the flanks of the fire using hand tools and bulldozers. In the Booth Fire area, firefighters controlled a 100 acres (0.40 km^{2}) spot fire along the southeast front, reducing the threat to Camp Sherman. Crews held their lines near Hoodoo while other firefighters extended the fire line along the west end of the fire, north of Potato Hill. At the end of the day, the total acreage burned was 40,815 acres (165.17 km^{2}) while the interagency incident management team estimated that the fire was 30 percent contained.

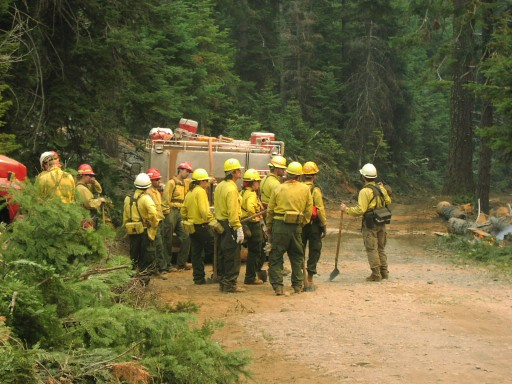
Crew working on the Booth Fire on 28 August

- The fires continued to burn actively on August 28; however, the 2,137 firefighters on scene were able to hold all established fire lines. The Bear Butte fire burned actively on its southern flank, closing the gap between the two fires to about 3 miles (4.8 km). Prevailing winds continued to push the Booth Fire slowly to the north and west while firefighters construct fire line in advance of the fire. Firefighters continued mopping up along the southern flank. On the western flank, crews built new fire line north from Lost Lake. Crews also finished falling hazardous snags along Route 20 and worked on spot fires all around the perimeter. At the end of the day, the interagency incident management team estimated the total acreage burned to be 41,311 acres (167.18 km^{2}).
- On August 29, crews worked on a fire line across the north side of the fire as well as a contingency fire break between the eastern flanks of the two fires. In the Bear Butte area, mop-up operations continued along completed fire lines. However, easterly winds increased fire activity in the northwest. On the west side of the Booth Fire, crews built fire line north from Lost Lake running towards Craig Lake while burn-out operations began on the northeast corner of the fire.
- On August 30, the western front of the B&B fires burned actively all day. As a result of dry weather conditions a number of spot fires and crowning runs were observed. Firefighters were able to hold established lines, except for a small spot fire in the Booth Fire area. High temperatures combined with moderate easterly winds continued pushing both fires west into the Jefferson wilderness area. Firefighters worked all day to construct fire line in advance of the fire. The evacuation order for most of the Camp Sherman area was lifted.

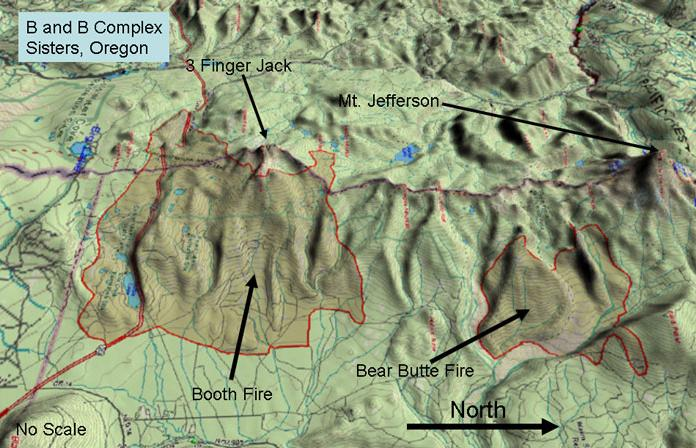
The Booth and Bear Butte fires on 31 August

- The Oregon Department of Transportation re-opened Route 20 on August 31. During the day, the Bear Butte Fire continued to burn in heavy fuels especially on its northwest front while firefighters made good progress along the northeast and southeast flanks. Brisk easterly winds push the Booth Fire over the crest of the Cascades at Minto Pass, between Three Fingered Jack and Mount Jefferson. The fire also burned actively in the Canyon Creek area. However, fire crews made good progress mopping up along the southern and eastern fire perimeter.
- On September 1, there were 2,292 personnel working on the fire including 65 fire crews, 79 pumper trucks, and 12 helicopters. The fire activity was reduced during the day. However, individual trees and small groups of trees continued to torch and a number of small spot fire required attention. The primary areas of fire activity were on the western flank within the Mount Jefferson Wilderness area. In the Bear Butte area, the east and northeast flanks remained secure while crews worked on fire lines on the south and southwest perimeters of the fire. However, active fire behavior was observed in the northwest corner of the fire. In the Booth Fire area, operations continued along the western flank between Lost Lake to Canyon Creek. At the end of the day, the total acreage burned was estimated to be 50,883 acres (205.92 km^{2}). The interagency incident management team announced that the fire was 45 percent contained.
- On September 2 the weather was hot and dry, creating extreme fire conditions. The primary areas of activity continue to be along the western flank of the fires in the Mount Jefferson Wilderness. Mop-up operations continued on the eastern and southern flanks of both fires and on the northern flank of the Bear Butte Fire.
- Continued hot dry weather allowed both fires to grow significantly on September 3. The Booth Fire advanced on the west side of the Cascades, southeast of Marion Forks, Oregon. As a result, the Willamette National Forest closed roads in the area and residents of Marion Forks were evacuated. A bulldozer line was cut around Camp Pioneer to protect structures at the Boy Scout campground. The Booth Fire also advanced to the northeast through the Brush Creek drainage and crossed a contingency fire line. Mop-up operations continued on the eastern and southern flanks of both fires and on the north side of the Bear Butte Fire. The interagency incident management team estimated that the fire covered 61,962 acres (250.75 km^{2}).

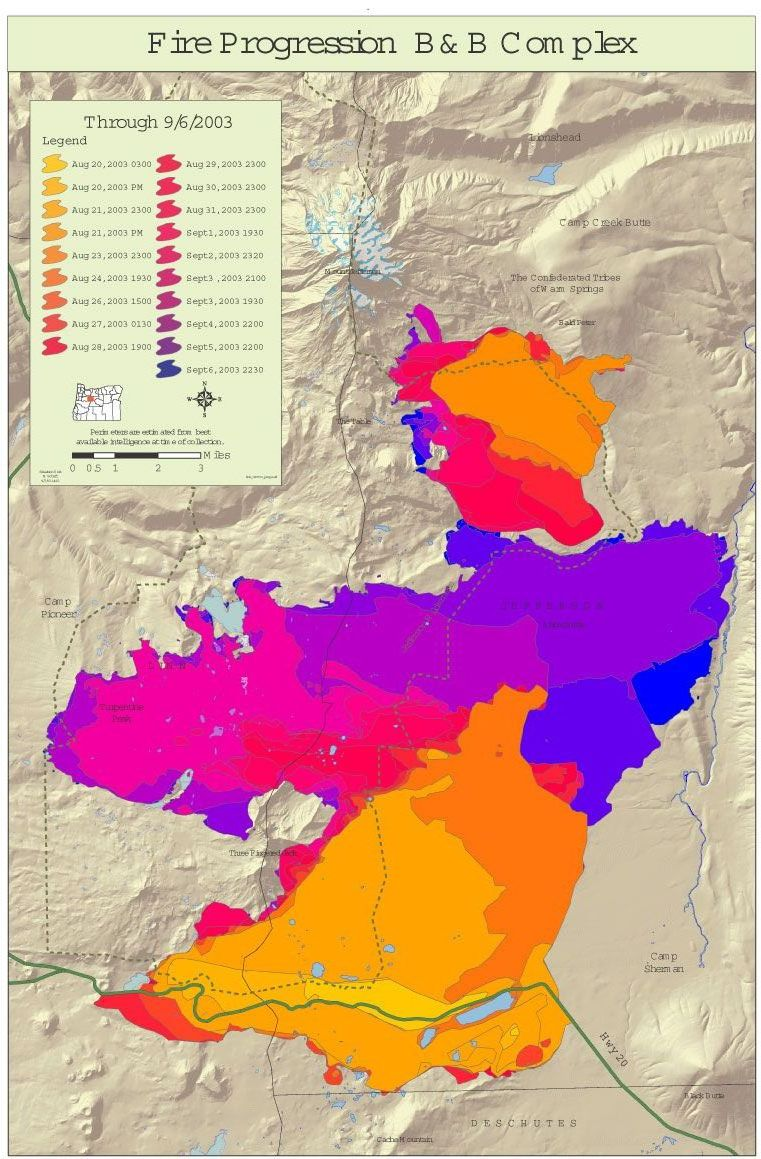
Map of B&B Fire progress through 6 September

- On September 4, the two fires merged. In addition, the fire behavior was extreme all day. It included torching of large areas, numerous crowning runs, and spot fires igniting up to .75 miles (1.21 km) ahead of main fire fronts. Along the western front of the Bear Butte fire area, the advancing flames forced the evacuation of a fire camp near Lower Bridge. The Booth Fire advanced to the northeast and crossed a well-developed fire line and a major Forest Service Road. This forced Camp Sherman residents to be evacuated for a second time. Route 20 was temporarily closed to facilitate the evacuation; however, it was later re-opened. Structural fire crews patrolled the Camp Sherman area all day. On the west side of the fire, crews constructed fires line north from Camp Pioneer toward Fir Lake. A contingency fire line was constructed from Marion Forks eastward to Marion Flats while structural fire crews patrolled the area. By the end of the day, the total acreage burned was estimated to be 70,769 acres (286.39 km^{2}), and the interagency incident management team revised its containment estimated to 40 percent.
- On September 5, the eastern front of the fire advanced to within .5 miles (0.80 km) of the Metolius River. On the western front, firefighters continued constructing fire lines east of the Marion Forks and Oregon Route 22 while structural protection crews patrolled the area. Crews also completed a bulldozer fire line along the west boundary of the Mount Jefferson Wilderness. In the Bear Butte area, fire activity was moderate on the west side; however, firefighters made progress mopping up on the north and east flanks. During the night, the acreage burned grew to 82,888 acres (335.44 km^{2}).
- On September 6, the B&B fire continued to burn in rugged country on both sides of the Cascades. During the day, there were 2,379 firefighters on scene supported by 112 pumper trucks and 14 helicopters. West of Camp Sherman crews worked with hand tools supported by pumper trucks and helicopters to improve containment lines. In the afternoon, gusty winds blew embers across the Metolius River, starting a .25 acres (0.0010 km^{2}) spot fire on the east side of the river near Lower Bridge Campground. The fire was extinguished by the end of the day. West of the Cascades, hand crews continued mopping up on the north and west sides of the fire near Table Lake and Bear Butte in the Mount Jefferson Wilderness area and on the neighboring Warm Springs Reservation. Crews improved fire lines near Marion Lake and continued providing on-site protection at Camp Pioneer. By the end of the day, the total acreage burned was estimated to be 88,737 acres (359.11 km^{2}).

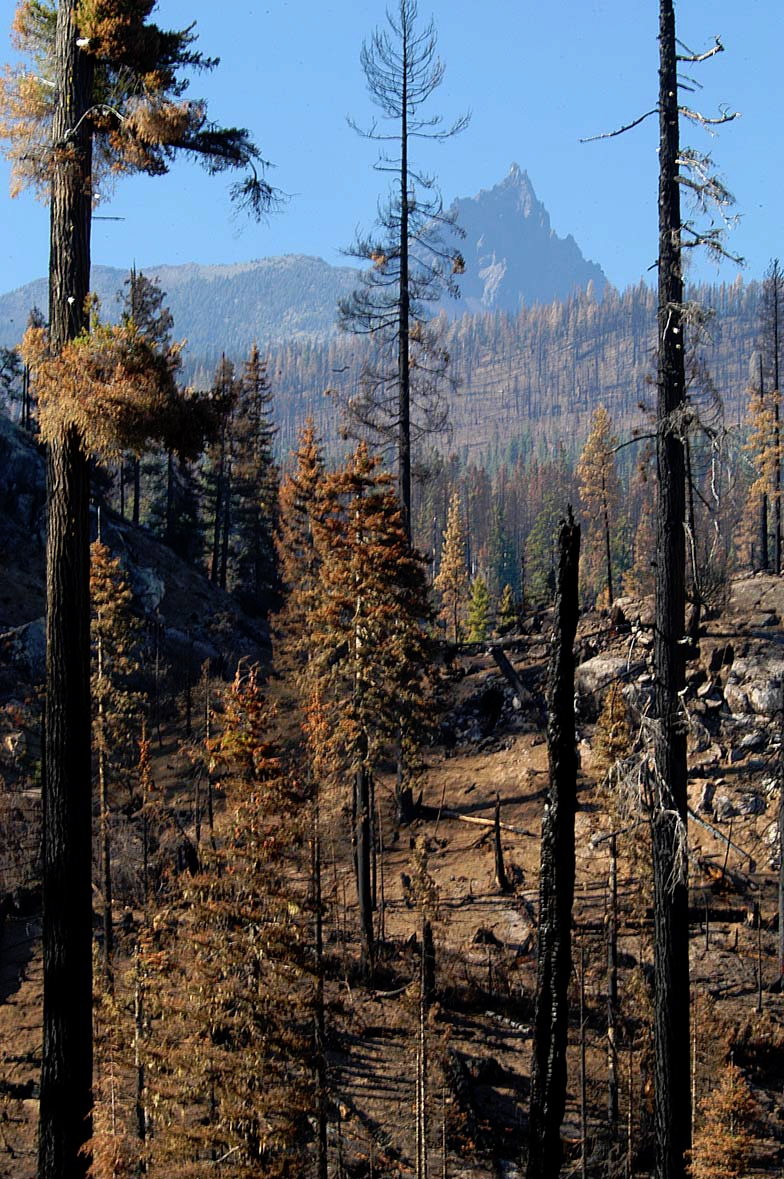
Burned area near Three Fingered Jack

- On September 7, about .5 inches (13 mm) of rain fell on the west side of the fire and lesser amounts fell on the east side. The precipitation allowed crews to work close to the fires, building and strengthening containment lines. Camp Sherman residents were allowed to return home; however, two structure protection task forces remain in place in Camp Sherman area. Also, a second smaller (Type-II) interagency incident management team began directing fire suppression efforts on the west side of the fire. The team set up headquarters in Idanha, Oregon on Route 22, east of Detroit Lake. The interagency incident management team estimated the total acreage burned to be 90,376 acres (365.74 km^{2}). They also estimated the fire was 50 percent contained.
- It rained again on September 8, dropping up to 2 inches (51 mm) on some parts of the west side forest while the east side received about .2 inches (5.1 mm). This second day of precipitation gave fire crews the opportunity to extend and strengthen containment lines on all sides of the fire. Crews also began rehabilitation work on fire lines in the Hoodoo and in Suttle Lake areas.
- Between September 9 and September 26, modest rainfall and cooler temperatures allowed firefighters to construct containment lines close to the fire on its slow moving northwest front in the vicinity of Marion Lake and along the western boundary of the Mount Jefferson Wilderness. Crews then shifted focus from fire suppression to mop-up and rehabilitation throughout the B&B fire area. The number of personnel on the fire was reduced steadily from 2,134 on 9 September to 1,604 on 16 September. The number of personnel working on the fire dropped below 1,000 on 19 September. By 22 September, there were less than 500 troops working on the fire. On 26 September, the interagency incident management team declared the B&B Complex Fires contained and closed its headquarters camp at Sisters.

== Fire area ==
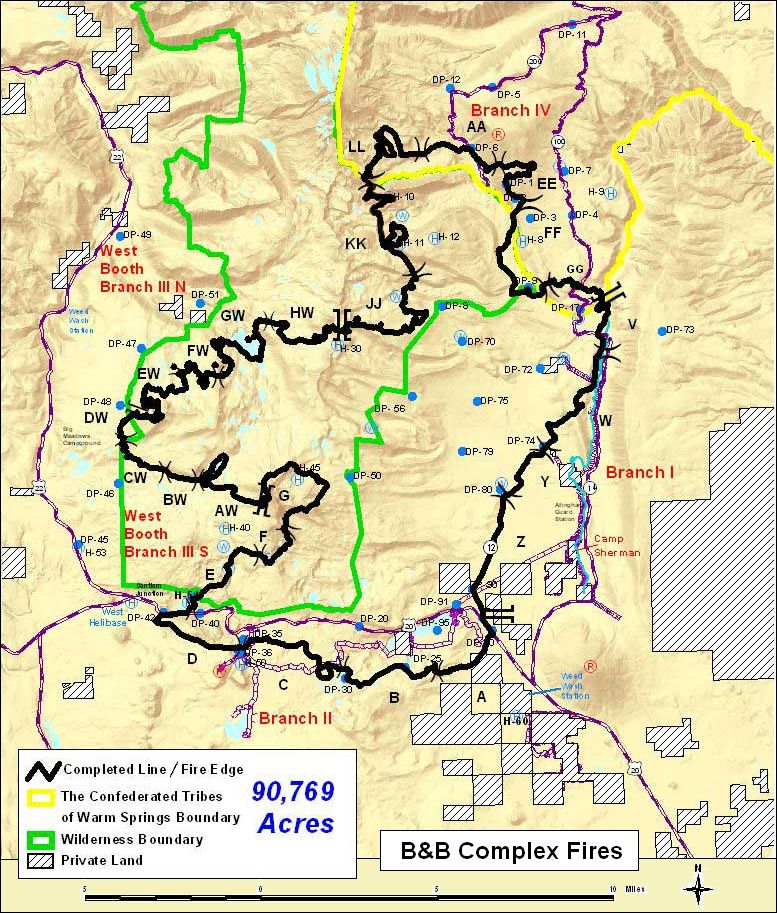
Map of the B&B Complex Fire, September 2003

The size of the fire was originally reported to be 90,376 acres (365.74 km^{2}). Most of the burned area was Federal land. However, forest lands belonging to the State of Oregon, the Confederated Tribes of Warm Springs, and various private owners were also burned.

The burned acreage was identified as follows:

- Deschutes National Forest (non-wilderness), 42,248 acres (170.97 km^{2})
- Deschutes National Forest (Mount Jefferson Wilderness), 23,116 acres (93.55 km^{2})
- Willamette National Forest (non-wilderness), 2,739 acres (11.08 km^{2})
- Willamette National Forest (Mount Jefferson Wilderness), 17,303 acres (70.02 km^{2})
- Warm Springs Confederation Tribes, 3,799 acres (15.37 km^{2})
- State of Oregon, 82 acres (0.33 km^{2})
- Private land, 1,089 acres (4.41 km^{2})

After carefully mapping the burned area, the Forest Service changed the official total of acres burned to 90,769 acres (367.33 km^{2}). During the course of the B&B Complex Fires, there were 13 structures destroyed and 8 firefighters injured. The total cost of the fire suppression effort was over $38.7 million.

On the west side of the Cascades, most of the burned forest was Douglas-fir and western hemlock. On the east side of the mountains, the fire burned mostly Ponderosa pine, lodgepole pine, and jack pine. The two largest Rocky Mountain Douglas-fir trees in the United States are located in the area where the Bear Butte and Booth fires burned together, well within the fire's perimeter. Both forest giants survived the fire, probably due to their size and thick bark. Oregon Department of Forestry keeps track of the record trees within the state and nominates the largest to the National Register of Big Trees. The larger of the two Douglas-fir trees in the B&B burn area is 24 ft 7 in (7.49 m) in circumference and 114 feet (35 m) tall.

== Post-fire activity ==
On 5 September, the Forest Service dispatched a Burned Area Emergency Response Team to begin evaluating the rehabilitation requirement for the B&B Complex Fires. The team consisted of archaeologists, botanists, geologists, hydrologists, soil scientists, and forest engineers. The team assessed the environmental damage caused by the fire and related fire suppression activities. Following their report the Forest Service allocated $1.5 million for emergency stabilization and recovery of the affected area.

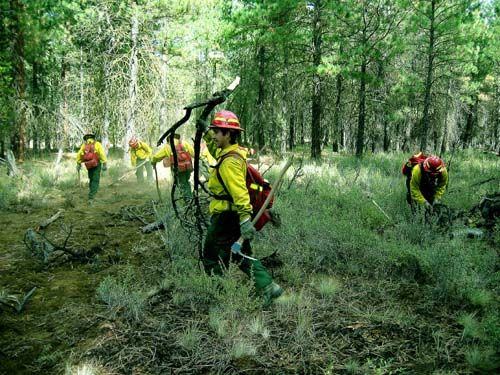
Crew rehabilitating a fire line in September 2003

Shortly after the fire, smokejumpers and professional timber fallers cut hazard snags along Forest Service roads. Approximately 950 fire-killed trees were removed, allowing survey teams and rehabilitation crews to safely conduct their work.

The next stage of the recovery work focused on high and moderate severity burn areas where there was an increased risk of runoff damage. Special attention was given to preventing water pollution and soil degradation in the Metolius River watershed. Forest Service crews removed fire debris from the banks of Abbot Creek, Bear Valley Creek, Bush Creek, Canyon Creek, Davis Creek, First Creek, Link Creek, and Jack Creek. They also replaced a number of small culverts with larger ones. This helped minimize drainage onto roads and ensured streams were able to accommodate increases flow from surface runoff. This was especially critical in streams with native bull trout, which are a threatened species. Crews also cleared forest recreation sites and hiking trails. This included a project that improved drainage along 33 miles (53 km) of the Pacific Crest Trail in order to reduce surface erosion. Finally, the Forest Service posted 40 new signs warning visitors of post-fire hazards.

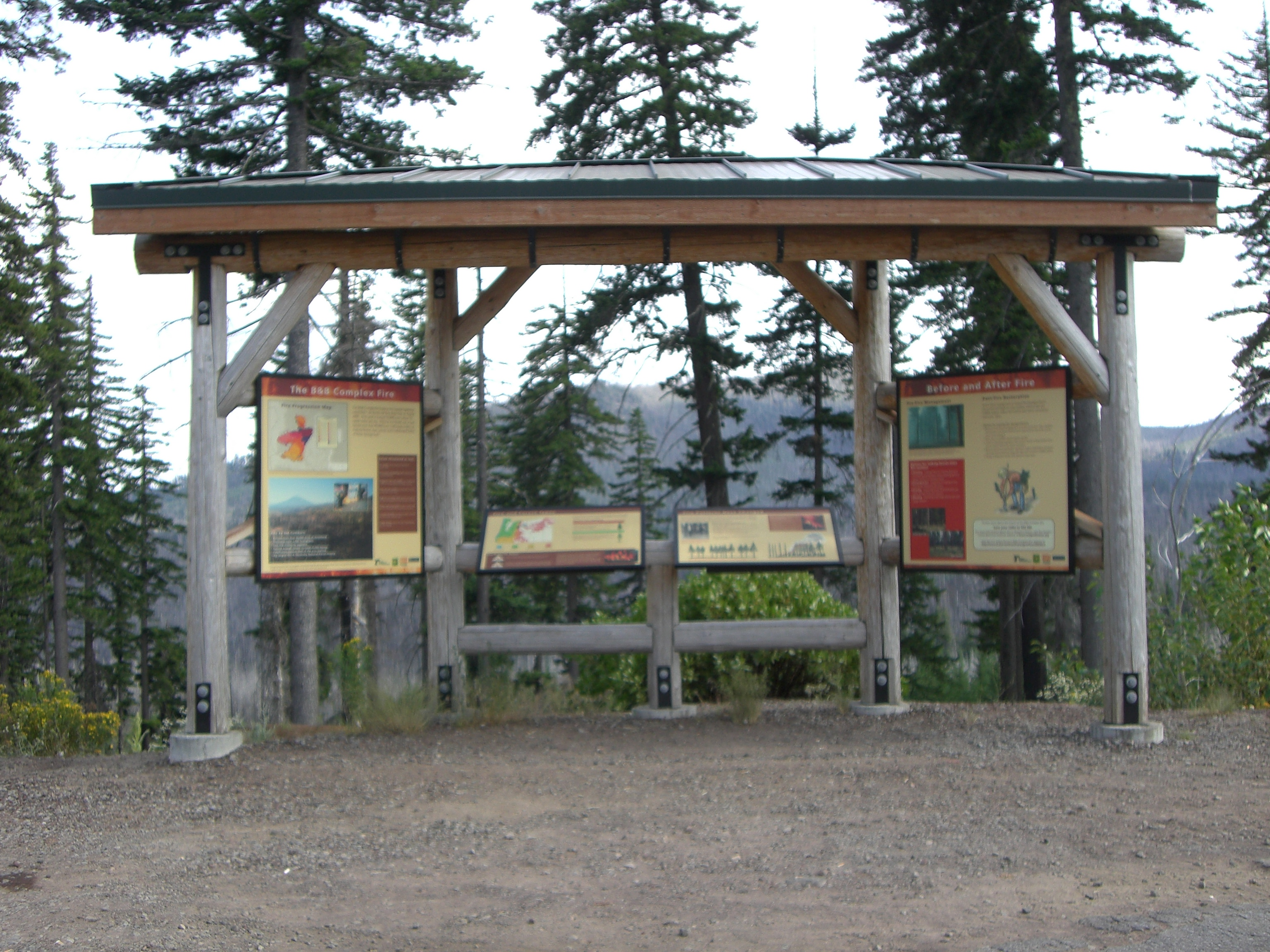
Interpretive exhibit describing the B&B Fires

Forest botanists identified fifty noxious weed sites within the fire area, covering 305 acres (1.23 km^{2}). To deal with this problem, the Deschutes National Forest implemented a program to prevent the spread of noxious weeds especially along roads, trail, and in heavy use areas. These efforts helped encourage the return of native grasses and herbaceous shrubs throughout the burned areas.

In 2005, the Forest Service approved a plan for salvage logging on 6,823 acres (27.61 km^{2}) burned by the B&B Complex Fires. The plan allowed commercial loggers to harvest trees killed by the fire. There was some criticism of the plan; however, the Forest Service determined that in the specific areas identified for post-fire timber harvest, the prescribed operations would utilize valuable timber assets, prevent the build-up of light fuels in burned areas, and help prevent soil degradation by encouraging rapid reforestation.

In 2007, interpretive exhibits describing the B&B Complex Fires and post-fire forest recovery were installed at three locations along Route 20. The exhibits were jointly sponsored by the Forest Service, Oregon Department of Transportation, Oregon State University, and the Oregon Forest Resources Institute.
