= Lost Lake (Santiam Pass, Linn County, Oregon) =

Lake in Santiam Pass, Linn County, Oregon, United States

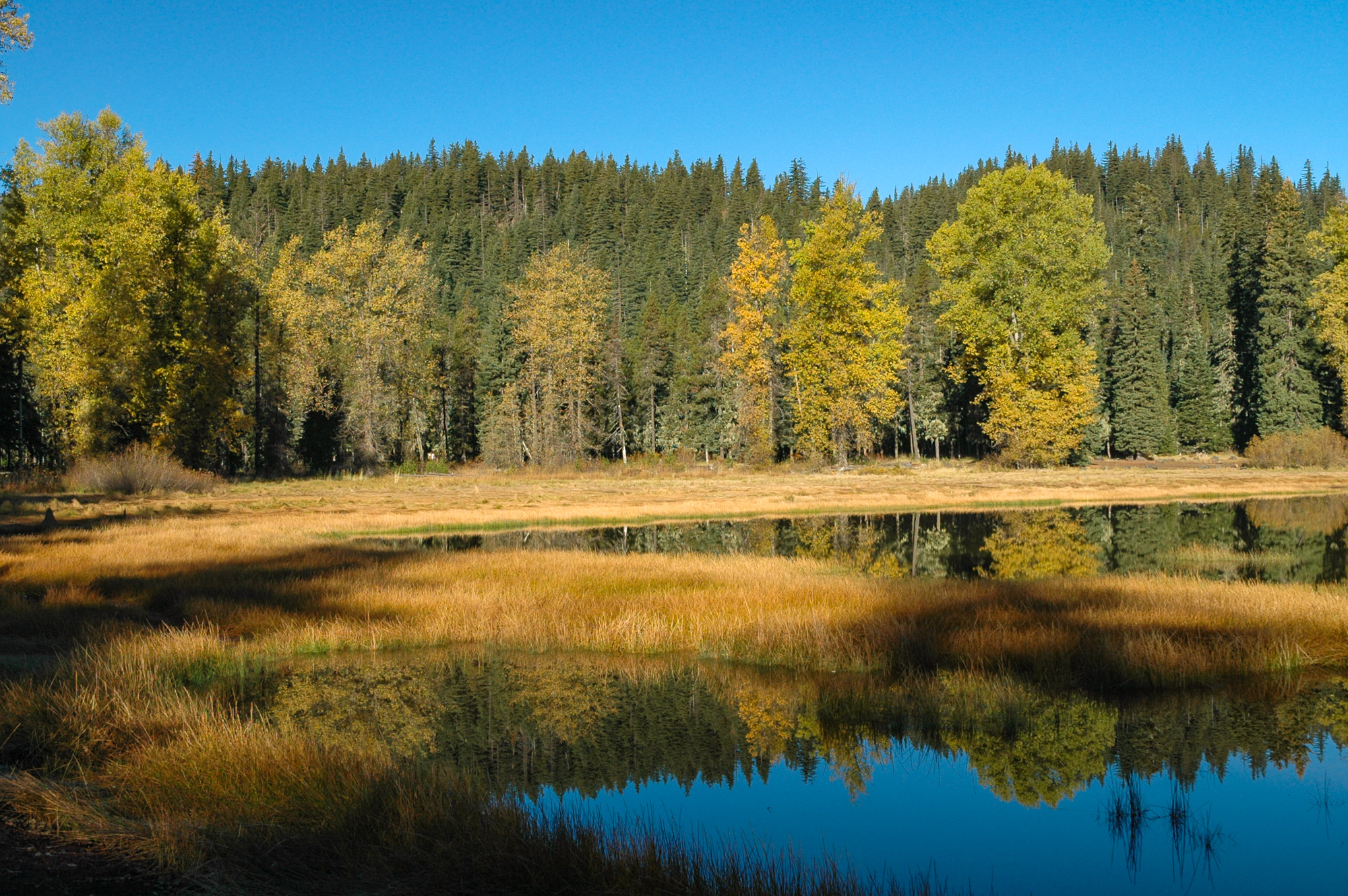
- Lost Lake and fall colors in Cascades along Highway 20. Linn County

- Location within Oregon Location within the United States
- Location: Linn County, Oregon
- Coordinates: 44°25′57″N 121°54′34″W
- Basin countries: United States
- Max. length: 0.62 mi (1 km)
- Surface area: 50 acres (20 ha)
- Surface elevation: 3,983 ft (1,214 m)

Lost Lake is a shallow closed-basin lake in the Willamette National Forest 29 kilometres (18 mi) southwest of Mount Jefferson and east of Santiam Junction, Oregon, United States.

Geologically, much of the area surrounding the lake is lava bed created during a period of volcanic activity around 1000 BCE in the Cascade Range of Oregon. Water levels on the lake change significantly over the seasons; in spring, autumn, and winter the lake is a popular fishing location, but during the summer the lake drains completely through lava tube drain holes in the bottom of the lake. Open lava tubes are scattered around the region, and the nearby Fish Lake (44.40122°N 122.01377°W) is another lake with underwater drain holes. Over the years, locals have attempted to fill in the drain holes with debris, and used heavy machinery to carve holes elsewhere in the lakebed to keep some water from draining out. A research project in 2003 inferred that the water goes through the lava tubes into Clear Lake 9.5 km (5.9 mi) southwest.
