= Sand Mountain Volcanic Field =

Volcanic field in Oregon

- Volcanic field
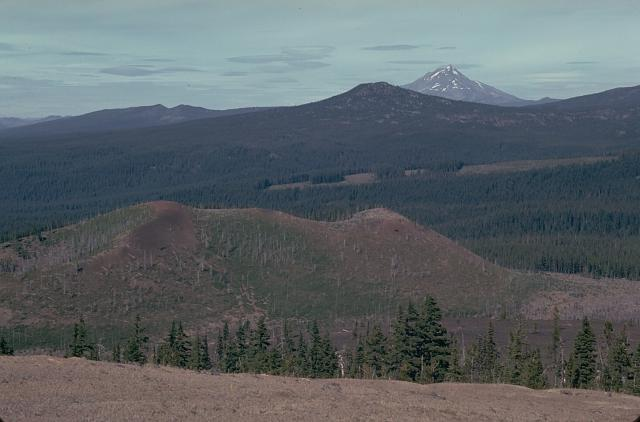
- View down the north–northeast alignment of the Sand Mountain Volcanic Field, with Mount Jefferson visible in the distance
- Interactive map of Sand Mountain Volcanic Field
- Location: Oregon, United States
- Range: Cascade Range
- Age: Holocene
- Elevation: 5,459 feet (1,664 m)
- Volcanic arc: Cascade Volcanic Arc
- Last eruption: 70 AD/2,000 years ago

The Sand Mountain Volcanic Field (also known as the Sand Mountain Field) is a volcanic field in the upper McKenzie River watershed, located in the United States in Oregon. Part of the Cascade Volcanic Arc, it lies southwest of Mount Jefferson and northwest of Belknap Crater and Mount Washington. Its highest elevation is 5,463 feet (1,665 m).

Active during the Holocene epoch, the Sand Mountain Field began erupting about 4,000 years ago. The field includes 23 basaltic and basaltic andesitic cinder cones and lava flows, for a total of 42 volcanic vents within two roughly north–south trending alignments. Its total dense-rock equivalent eruptive output is 0.22 to 0.29 cubic miles (0.92 to 1.21 km^{3}), with subfeatures including a tephra field and a lava tube system. Future activity is possible, but according to the Volcano Hazards Program of the United States Geological Survey, the threat from the field itself is low.

The field lies within the Willamette National Forest near Santiam Pass. It supports some forested areas, which grow well on lava flows with tephra that serves as suitable soil for stands of Douglas fir and western hemlock and less commonly western red cedar. The surroundings represent an area of geological interest, and scoria has been quarried from one of the field's volcanic cones for highway supplies. Nearby tourist destinations include a ski resort, Tamolitch Falls, and Clear Lake.

== Geography ==
The Sand Mountain Field is part of the Cascade volcanic arc and is located at the western edge of the High Cascades segment of the central Oregon Cascades, near the upper McKenzie River watershed in Oregon, in the United States. It encompasses an area of 29 square miles (76 km^{2}) and has a maximum elevation of 5,463 feet (1,665 m). Located within the Willamette National Forest in the McKenzie Ranger District near Santiam Pass, the Sand Mountain Volcanic Field is southwest of Mount Jefferson and northwest of Belknap Crater and Mount Washington.

The field borders Clear Lake, the source for the McKenzie River, and lava flows from the field formed a dam that created the lake. Clear Lake encompasses 148 acres (0.60 km^{2}) near Oregon Route 126, with a shallow northern region and a deeper southern zone, which reaches a maximum depth of 175 feet (53 m). Other nearby lakes include Lost Lake, Lava Lake, and Fish Lake. Fish Lake is an ephemeral lake that dries up during the summer season, formed by the damming of local water drainages by a lava flow from Sand Mountain Volcanic Field about 3,850 years ago. Local topography has influenced eruptive activity in the past, directing lava flows downhill to the west and, with wind, directing tephra to the northeast.

Annual precipitation in the Oregon Cascades averages 79 to 150 inches (2,000 to 3,800 mm), with about 80 percent falling in the winter season. In the High Cascades, discharge is steady throughout the year, and precipitation falls mostly as snow, which then melts, seeps into the ground, and reaches springs several years later.

== Ecology ==
The southern part of the field supports mature forests, but other zones with younger lava deposits are barren. Mature forests correspond to lava flow areas with tephra; areas that do not have tephra cover lack soil and support only limited vegetation. Below elevations of 4,300 feet (1,300 m), these forests are typical of the lowland temperate climate of the Pacific Northwest, with Douglas fir and western hemlock predominating. Notably, forests in the Sand Mountain volcanic field have fewer western red cedar trees than is common among other forests in the Pacific Northwest region. Fen wetlands surround Lost Lake, which is about 3.1 miles (5 km) north–northeast of the field.

Within Clear Lake is a submerged forest of Douglas fir trees. Well-preserved under 120 feet (37 m) of water, they can be seen standing on the bottom of the lake. The cold water prevents most life from growing, giving the lake its name, Analysis of samples from the underwater trees in 1965 suggested that the trees were "drowned" about 3,000 years ago, when a lava flow from Sand Mountain created Clear Lake. The eruption altered the ecosystem and created new habitats in the lake, on its shores, and on the new lava flow deposits. Today, life in the lake includes naturally reproducing fish species in Clear Lake such as brook and cutthroat trout, and the water is restocked annually with rainbow trout.

== Geology ==
The Cascade Range and Cascade Volcanic Arc result from the subduction of the Juan de Fuca tectonic plate under the North American tectonic plate. In the Central Oregon Cascades, there are two subsegments: the Western Cascades (active from about 35 to 5 million years ago) and the High Cascades (active since 5 million years ago). As the North American Plate has rotated in a clockwise fashion above the subduction zone, volcanism has moved east in the central Oregon Cascades and moved west in the northern Cascades.

The graben of the High Cascades is bounded to the east by the Green Ridge fault zone and to the west by the Horse Creek fault zone. It has a width of 19 miles (30 km) and a depth of 1.2 to 1.9 miles (2 to 3 km). Predominantly, it has generated mafic (rich in magnesium and iron) lava, producing about 14 cubic miles (60 km^{3}) of magma within the past 15,000 years. Moreover, many of the identified eruptive vents from the Quaternary include scoria cones or other mafic vents. The High Cascades graben displays a unique geochemical signature with low-K tholeiite magma and a relatively enriched mantle source, produced by extension and heat flux.

The Sand Mountain Volcanic Field was formed after magma entered rock that was fractured by faulting related to subsidence of the High Cascades graben. Beginning as dikes, these bodies of magma moved through conduits to separate volcanic vents at the surface. The initial magma was basaltic, though this was replaced several hundred years later by more evolved, basaltic andesite magma. Eruptions at Sand Mountain Field were fed by two or three magma chambers, including a number of mafic magma sources over a brief span of distance and time.

The Sand Mountain Volcanic Field includes 23 basalt and basaltic andesite cinder cones and associated lava flows, which were produced by two roughly north–south trending alignments of 42 volcanic vents. The two groups cross near the Sand Mountain cinder cone; their alignments imply the existence of complex volcanic dikes under the field. Sand Mountain marks the largest cinder cone in the field, at a height of 820 feet (250 m). According to the Global Volcanism Program, the field includes six major clusters of volcanic vents, all pyroclastic cones. These are the Central Group, Little Nash Crater, Lost Lake Group, Nash Crater, Sand Mountain Cones, and South Group. Slight variations in vent alignment within groups likely reflect the small differences in local tectonic stress fields. There is also evidence of vent reoccupation, suggested by lava deposits in close proximity at the Old Wagon Road vent and Great Spring vent eruptive units; one of the Great Spring cones buries part of an Old Wagon Road vent.

There are three major geochemical groups in the field: Sand, Lost Lake, and Nash. Together they amount to 13 eruptive units, three of which have not been associated with exposed volcanic vents and one cluster of volcanic cones that do not have associated lava flows. The Sand group includes five eruptive units, while the Nash and Lost Lake group both consist of four units. The Jack Pine cone has no associated lava deposits, and the SnoPark lava unit has no associated volcanic vent. These two deposits exhibit unique compositions; SnoPark lava has relatively higher levels of barium and potassium oxide than the rest of the field, with the exception of the Jack Pine lava, which has even higher concentrations of barium (and also very high levels of strontium), at 1081 ppm and 1343 ppm, respectively.

Single lava units at the field have uniform compositions, which is distinct from other young lava deposits within the surrounding region; major distinguishing elements include silicon dioxide (silica), titanium dioxide, magnesium oxide, and calcium oxide. The Sand group has high compositional variation, ranging from basalt to basaltic andesite, while the Lost Lake group is mostly basalt, and the Nash group is completely composed of basaltic andesite. The Nash group shows distinctively high silica content and a unique ratio of iron(II) oxide to magnesium oxide, and the Lost Lake Group is distinguished by its lower iron(II) oxide to magnesium oxide ratio and high magnesium oxide content.

According to Wood and Kienle (1993), the field has a lava composition of subalkaline basalt and basaltic andesite. Deligne et al (2016) argue that the field also has calc-alkaline basalt. Morphologically, Sand Mountain Field lavas have blocky appearances, reaching thicknesses up to 49 feet (15 m) though certain parts of the Lost Lake group have a ropy, pāhoehoe surface.

=== Subfeatures ===
The Jack Pine cone in the Sand Mountain Field is composed of absarokites, which are unique within the Cascade Range. Its geochemical signature suggests that it was fed by a distinct magma chamber. Absarokites occur within the forearc of the Cascades and the Central Cascades, so this unique magma may be the result of old, metasomatized material from the Earth's mantle.

The basaltic andesite at Little Nash Crater includes many small plagioclase phenocrysts with less abundant olivine phenocrysts, with silica levels of about 56.8 percent. These flows are younger than 2,590 ± 150 years by radiocarbon dating. Basaltic lava from the Lost Lake cone group contained 2–3 percent olivine phenocrysts, which are slightly porphyritic; these deposits have been radiocarbon dated to 1,950 ± 150 years BP. At Nash Crater, there are basaltic andesite lava flows with sparse olivine phenocrysts and silica levels of about 53.5 percent. The lava from the main Sand Mountain chain varies from 51.6–53.2 percent silica, thus ranging from basalt to basaltic andesite in composition. Basalt lava at Sand Mountain contains sparse plagioclase and olivine phenocrysts, while basaltic andesite lava only exhibits olivine phenocrysts. These flows vary in age from are 3,850 ± 215 years BP to 2,750 years BP.

The field also includes an extensive tephra deposit, which encompasses an area of 59 square miles (154 km^{2}) and has a volume of 0.094 cubic miles (0.39 km^{3}). This tephra field is notable because it has a much greater volume and extent than tephra produced by other mafic volcanoes in the central Oregon Cascades. Additionally, the tephra exhibits uniformity with a fine mode grain size of 0.0049 inches (125 μm) to 0.020 inches (0.5 mm) and a lack of lapilli. These tephra deposits vary in age from 3,440 ± 250 to 1,600 years BP, according to radiocarbon dating. They reach thicknesses of greater than 6.6 feet (2 m) as far as 5.6 miles (9 km) from the Sand Mountain cinder cone and greater than 3.3 feet (1 m) up to 7.5 miles (12 km) from the cinder cone. Microfractures within Sand Mountain clastic rock along with the blocky, equant shapes and density of sideromelane and tachylite clastic rock in the field suggest that Sand Mountain Field lava interacted with water. According to McKay (2012), this likely came from groundwater.

There is a lava tube called Lucy's Cavern that funneled the Sand Mountain Volcanic Field flows. It has a length of at least 490 feet (150 m) and reaches depths of 26 to 33 feet (8 to 10 m). Its roof has a vaulted appearance with drip-like features. There are also two circular "vertical pits" that reach depths of 62 feet (19 m) and 98 feet (30 m), respectively. These open vertical conduit lava caves, known as Century and Moss Pits, lie to the southwest of Sand Mountain on a ridge of spatter material that trends to the east. There are also remnants of a third open conduit in a former vent, which left a crater about 30 feet (9.1 m) in diameter. Both Moss Pit and Century Pit have vertical, circular entrances with smooth, remelted lining. Moss Pit has a diameter of 8 feet (2.4 m) at the entrance, with a depth of 63 feet (19 m). It also features a small chamber near its base, which slopes down for another 10 feet (3.0 m). Century Pit lies 150 feet (46 m) to the east of Moss Pit, with an entrance 3 feet (0.91 m) in diameter. Surrounded by a wall of spatter material ranging from 1 to 2 feet (0.30 to 0.61 m) in height, it has a vertical drop of 94 feet (29 m), its lower half widening to a chamber with dimensions of 10 by 25 feet (3.0 by 7.6 m) at its base. The western margin of the base has an opening about 6 feet (1.8 m) deep, and at that depth it is blocked by debris. The lower chambers for both pits may be influenced by a fissure or may form part of an open fissure vent.

=== Status as a volcanic field ===
Deligne et al. (2016) argue that "it is inarguably inappropriate" to consider Sand Mountain a volcanic field despite its official name. They assert that Sand Mountain is a short-lived subfeature of a larger volcanic field of Quaternary volcanism in the region, which they refer to as the Central Oregon volcanic field.

== Eruptive history ==
During the Holocene epoch, volcanic activity has been particularly concentrated between the North Sister volcano and Three Fingered Jack, with at least 125 distinct eruptive centers active since the retreat of Pleistocene glaciers. Eruptive activity in the upper McKenzie River catchment has been taking place since after the eruption of Mount Mazama about 7,700 years ago. Thus, it represents one of the youngest volcanic regions in the Cascade Arc. This activity is concentrated in the central Oregon Cascades, at the northwestern margin of the High Cascades graben near the boundary of the High Cascades and Western Cascades.

The last eruption in the Sand Mountain Volcanic Field took place about 2,000 years ago at the Lost Lake cinder cone group, which lies at the northern–northeastern end of the field. Before that, about 3,000 to 4,000 years ago, lava flows erupted from vents along the chain. They moved west and blocked drainage to create small lakes. Past lava flows from Sand Mountain and the nearby Belknap Crater historically disrupted the McKenzie River, producing highly fractured lava deposits across canyons, lakes, streams, and springs. They also produced the Sahalie Falls and the Koosah Falls, as well as the 1.5-mile (2.4 km) long Clear Lake, which still contains branches and bark from tree debris after the eruption.

The overall dense-rock equivalent (DRE) volume for the volcanic field lavas and volcanic cones is estimated to be 0.22 to 0.29 cubic miles (0.9 to 1.2 km^{3}). The Sand group has a DRE volume of 0.15 cubic miles (0.64 km^{3}), Lost Lake a DRE volume of 0.072 cubic miles (0.3 km^{3}), and Nash group a DRE volume of 0.053 cubic miles (0.22 km^{3}).

Past radiometric dating gave Sand Mountain Volcanic Field's age within a 1,000 year range. More precise paleomagnetic dating suggested that the field includes at least 13 distinct eruptive units, which were generated over a short period of time (likely just a few decades) about 2,950 years ago. The Jack Pine vent, which resides at the northern edge of the field, has a distinct composition from the field's other landforms; it likely erupted about 4,000 years prior to the rest of the field. Deligne et al. (2016) agree with this age estimate, arguing that tephrochronology evidence and lava composition analysis suggest that Jack Pine erupted about 7,000 years ago, while the main Sand Mountain Volcanic Field eruptions took place circa 3,000 years ago.

According to the Global Volcanism Program, a confirmed eruption dated to 950 BCE ± 200 years had a Volcanic Explosivity Index of 4, while another confirmed eruption at Jack Mountain dated to 5050 BCE had a Volcanic Explosivity Index of 2. While geological evidence suggests that eruptions at Sand Mountain Field were explosive, they differed from violent, Strombolian eruptions because their very explosive eruptions were sustained over a long period of time, likely partly attributable to interaction with water. Walsh (2012) classifies the eruptions as sub-Plinian.

The Nash Crater cinder cone erupted lava flows about 3,850 years ago, which coursed west and blocked a stream to create Fish Lake and Lava Lake. The lava flows were unvegetated and blocky. According to Sherrod et al. (2004), these flows, also known as the Fish Lake lava flow, represent the oldest lava flows near the Santiam and McKenzie Passes after the cataclysmic eruption of Mount Mazama. Radiocarbon dating of a charred conifer branch found in Sand Mountain volcanic ash yielded an age of 3,440 ± 250 years Before Present (BP). Radiocarbon dating of charcoal on a lateral moraine near Nash Crater gave an age of 2,590 ± 150 BP. The Lost Lake cinder cones erupted about 1,950 years ago, along a fissure that trended from north to south near the northern end of the volcanic field. These eruptions blocked the Lost Creek tributary, forming Lost Lake.

=== Future threats ===
The Sand Mountain Field is located 62 miles (100 km) from a population of roughly 500,000 people. It is close to a major transportation corridor from central Oregon to the Willamette Valley as well as a popular ski area, and future eruptions could have "substantial societal consequences" according to Deligne et al. (2016). Lava flows from an eruption in the surrounding Central Oregon volcanic field could reach highways, but most mafic volcanism in the region is unlikely to threaten transportation given the small number of local roads. Tephra from eruptions at Sand Mountain could reach more than 6.2 miles (10 km) from the vent, and if lava flows reached forested regions they could initiate forest fires. However, according to the Volcano Hazards Program of the United States Geological Survey, the threat potential from the field is "Low/Very Low."

Eruptive activity within the nearby Cascades Range is likely to resume. Deformation near the Three Sisters complex volcano suggests the presence of intrusive magma in the region, which could eventually lead to eruptions, though the intrusion appears to be currently stalled. Further magma intrusions could lead to eruptions that would create new cinder cones similar to those in the Sand Mountain Field. Moreover, hazardous volcanic gases could accumulate after an eruption, such as sulfur dioxide, hydrogen chloride, and hydrogen fluoride.

== Human history ==
The upper McKenzie River catchment is an area of interest for geological research. The first research there took place in 1929, headed by H. T. Stearns. In 1957, H. Williams produced a reconnaissance geological map, which was followed by further mapping by E. M. Taylor in 1965. Taylor's work determined the presence of 9 lava units at Sand Mountain Volcanic Field and another lava unit from Belknap Crater. A map published by Sherrod et al. (2004) built upon Taylor's studies.

In November 1963, the United States Forest Service sent divers from the Whitewater Diver group from Eugene to obtain tree samples from Clear Lake using Aqua-Lung technology. Two samples were acquired from one tree section, both about 1 foot (0.30 m) in diameter, at a depth of about 13 feet (4.0 m). Radiocarbon dating analysis suggested that the samples were dated to 3,200 ± 220 and 2,705 ± 200 years Before Present, respectively; radiocarbon dating performed by Licciardi et al. (1999) found a similar result of 2750 ± 45 years Before Present. Later radiocarbon dating of a conifer branch and charcoal on a lateral moraine near Nash Crater in 2004 had respective estimates of 3,440 ± 250 and 2,590 ± 150 years Before Present.

Red and oxidized scoria has been quarried from Little Nash Crater for highway supplies near Santiam Pass. The Carmen Smith Hydroelectric Power Scheme is fed by the upper McKenzie River and generates about 115 horsepower (86 kW) of electricity.

== Recreation ==
The upper McKenzie River catchment area includes Clear Lake and Tamolitch Pool, which represent popular tourist locations. At Clear Lake, popular activities include canoeing, fishing, and non-motorized boating, with 34 campsites available at the Cold Water Cove Campground and a grocery store, tackle shop, and restaurant located at the adjacent Clear Lake Resort.

Volcanic formations including lava flows within McKenzie Pass have historically attracted the attention of passing motorists. There is also a ski resort at Santiam Pass.

== See also ==
- List of volcanic fields

== Sources ==
- Benson, G. T. (February 1965). "The age of Clear Lake, Oregon" (PDF). The Ore Bin. 27 (2). Oregon Department of Geology and Mineral Industries: 37–40. Archived (PDF) from the original on 2017-07-05.
- Deligne, N. I. (2012). After the Flow: Landscape Response to the Emplacement of Holocene Lava Flows, Central Oregon Cascades, USA (Thesis). University of Oregon. Archived from the original on 2019-01-11.
- Deligne, N. I.; Cashman, K. V.; Roering, J. J. (November 2013). "After the lava flow: The importance of external soil sources for plant colonization of recent lava flows in the central Oregon Cascades, USA". Geomorphology. 202: 15–32. Bibcode:2013Geomo.202...15D. doi:10.1016/j.geomorph.2012.12.009.
- Deligne, N. I.; Conrey, R. M.; Cashman, K. V.; Champion, D. E.; Amidon, W. H. (November 1, 2016). "Holocene volcanism of the upper McKenzie River catchment, central Oregon Cascades, USA". GSA Bulletin. 128 (11–12). Geological Society of America: 1618–1635. Bibcode:2016GSAB..128.1618D. doi:10.1130/B31405.1.
- Harris, S. L. (2005). "Chapter 13: The Three Sisters". Fire Mountains of the West: The Cascade and Mono Lake Volcanoes (Third ed.). Missoula, Montana: Mountain Press Publishing Company. pp. 179–200. ISBN 978-0-87842-511-2.
- Licciardi, J. M.; Kurz, M. D.; Clark, P. U.; Brook, E. J. (October 30, 1999). "Calibration of cosmogenic 3He production rates from Holocene lava flows in Oregon, USA, and effects of the Earth's magnetic field". Earth and Planetary Science Letters. 172 (3–4). Elsevier: 261–271. Bibcode:1999E&PSL.172..261L. doi:10.1016/S0012-821X(99)00204-6.
- McKay, D. (2012). Recent Mafic Eruptions at Newberry Volcano and in the Central Oregon Cascades: Physical Volcanology and Implications for Hazards (Thesis). University of Oregon. Archived from the original on 2019-03-28.
- Sherrod, D. R.; Taylor, E. M.; Ferns, M. L.; Scott, W. E.; Conrey, R. M.; Smith, G. A. (2004), Geologic Map of the Bend 30- × 60-Minute Quadrangle, Central Oregon (PDF), United States Geological Survey, Geologic Investigations Series I–2683, archived from the original on 2019-01-07.
- Siebert, L.; Simkin, T.; Kimberly, P. (2011). Volcanoes of the World (3 ed.). University of California Press. ISBN 978-0520268777.
- Skinner, C. E. (1982). "Open vertical volcanic conduits: a preliminary investigation of an unusual volcanic cave form with examples from Newberry Volcano and the Central High Cascades of Oregon" (PDF). Proceedings of the Third International Symposium on Vulcanospeleology: A Special Session of the 39th. Annual Convention of the National Speleological Society. Bend, Oregon: International Speleological Society. pp. 7–17. Archived (PDF) from the original on 2009-01-07.
- Stearns, H. T. (1929), Geology and water resources of the Upper McKenzie Valley, Oregon (PDF), United States Geological Survey, pp. 171–188, Water-Supply Paper 597-D, archived (PDF) from the original on 2019-01-04.
- Taylor, E. M. (July 1965). "Recent volcanism between Three Fingered Jack and North Sister, Oregon Cascade Range". Ore Bin. 27 (7). Oregon Department of Geology and Mineral Industries: 121–147.
- Walsh, L. K. (2012). Implications for volcanic hazards in the central and southern cascades based on gas emissions during explosive cinder cone activity (Thesis). University of Oregon.
- Wood, C. A.; Kienle, J., eds. (1993). Volcanoes of North America: United States and Canada. Cambridge, England: Cambridge University Press. ISBN 978-0-521-43811-7.
