= Black Crater =

Shield volcano in central Oregon, United States

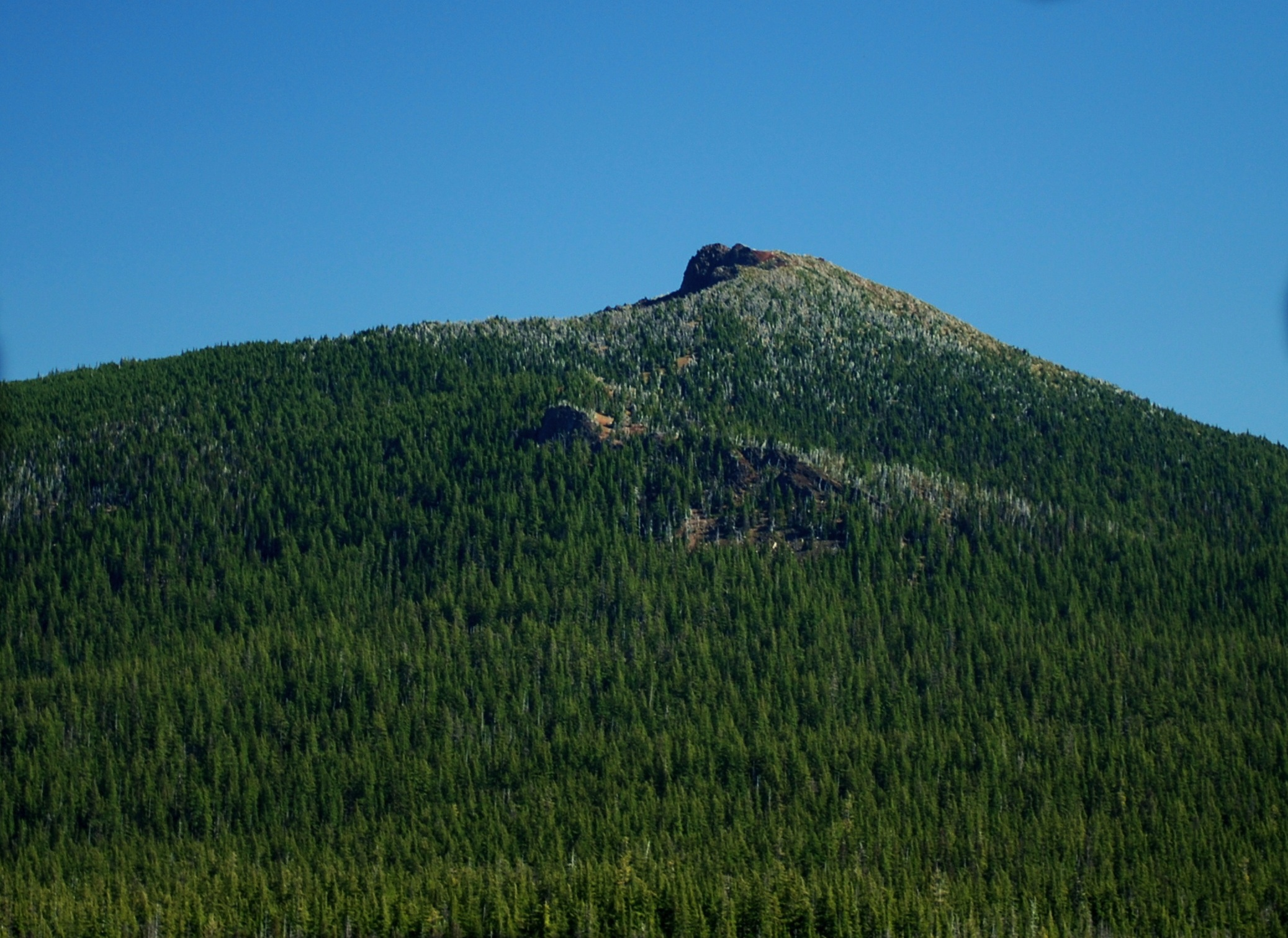
- The mountain seen from the Dee Wright Observatory

Highest point
- Elevation: 7,257 ft (2,212 m) NAVD 88
- Coordinates: 44°15′58″N 121°44′55″W

Geography
- Location within Oregon Location within the United States
- Location: Deschutes County, Oregon, U.S.
- Parent range: Cascade Range
- Topo map: USGS Black Crater

Geology
- Rock age: Late Pleistocene
- Mountain type: Shield volcano
- Volcanic arc: Cascade Volcanic Arc

Climbing
- Easiest route: Trail hike

Black Crater is a shield volcano in the Western Cascades in Deschutes County, Oregon. Located near McKenzie Pass, the volcano has a broad conical shape with gentle slopes. The volcano likely formed during the Pleistocene and has not been active within the last 50,000 years. Eruptive activity at the volcano produced mafic lava flows made of basaltic andesite and olivine basalt; it also formed a number of cinder cones. A normal fault occurs on the western side of the volcano, trending north–south. The volcano has been eroded by glaciers, which carved a large cirque into the northeastern flank of the mountain, forming its current crater.

The area was settled c. 1862, when pioneers moved to the forested region south of Black Crater, near what is now the city of Sisters. The volcano is part of the Three Sisters Wilderness, which offers recreational activities. The Black Crater Trail runs one way for 3.8 miles (6.1 km) from a trailhead on Oregon Route 242, and the southeastern part of the trail can be skied. Some Arctic–alpine plants can be found on the volcano, including mountain hemlock, ponderosa pine, bitterbrush, and Pacific silver fir.

== Geography ==
Black Crater lies in Deschutes County, southeast of Belknap Crater and northwest of Trout Creek Butte. Part of the Western Cascades, it is in the McKenzie Pass region and close to the Willamette National Forest. The Western Cascades consist of highly eroded layers of volcanic rock that drain into streams fed by runoff. These streams supply the Willamette River basin, and during the winter season the flow is increased by rain and melting snow.

The volcano has an elevation of 7,257 feet (2,212 m) according to the U.S. National Geodetic Survey, which has a station just below the volcano's summit. The volcano has a broad conical shape with gentle slopes and a diameter of about 1.9 miles (3 km). Its relief is about 1,969 feet (600 m).

Glaciers carved a cirque into the northeastern flank of the mountain, which forms its current crater. Glacial erosion has exposed the interior of the volcanic cone, but because of the volcano's relatively lower elevation and longer-lasting eruptive activity, it is less eroded than most other nearby volcanoes. Glaciers likely moved between cinder cones on Black Crater but did not erode them.

Black Crater is part of the Three Sisters Wilderness, which covers an area of 281,190 acres (1,137.9 km^{2}) and is therefore the second-largest wilderness area in Oregon. Designated by the United States Congress in 1964, the wilderness area borders the Mount Washington Wilderness to the north and shares its southern edge with the Waldo Lake Wilderness. The area includes 260 miles (420 km) of trails and many forests, lakes, waterfalls, and streams, including the source of Whychus Creek. Black Crater sits at the northern edge of the wilderness, forming part of the Alpine Crest region. This area incorporates the northeastern third of the Three Sisters Wilderness and includes most of its major mountains as well as its most popularly visited glaciers, lakes, and meadows.

== Ecology and environment ==
Annual precipitation in the Oregon Cascades ranges from 11.5 to 13 feet (3.5 to 4.0 m) each year, with persistent but low-intensity rainfall. The wet climate supports rapid regeneration of vegetation, but the soil infiltration capacity is not surpassed even after fires. Black Crater lies at the border of this climate and the one found to the immediate east, where annual precipitation is less than 1.3 feet (0.40 m). Its soil consists of andisols with fine-grained loam and tephra ejected from nearby volcanoes.

Some Arctic–alpine plants can be found in the area around Black Crater above the timberline. The north side of Black Crater has thick stands of mountain hemlock, while the eastern side supports ponderosa pine and bitterbrush. On the western side, there is forest with mountain hemlock and Pacific silver fir.

On June 20, 2018, a debris flow coursed down the volcano, spurred on by runoff from a storm and secondary to the Milli Fire, which burned 24,000 acres (9,700 ha) of forest land one year prior. The flow started in an area with rilling and erosion near the upper volcano and traveled down the volcano's northwestern slope, crossing Oregon Route 242 at two points. The fire had burned 63% of the debris flow area at moderate or high severity. At its narrowest point, the flow was 16.5 feet (5.0 m), with depths exceeding 5 feet (1.5 m).

== Geology ==
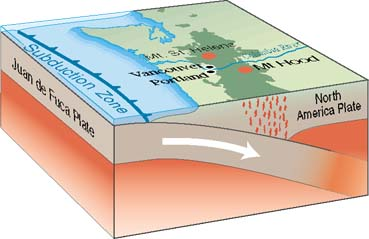
Volcanism in the Cascade Range results from the subduction of the oceanic Juan de Fuca tectonic plate under the North American tectonic plate

The Cascade Range resulted from the subduction of the Juan de Fuca tectonic plate under the North American tectonic plate, with the High Cascade subprovince in central Oregon forming about 160 to 190 miles (250 to 300 km) east of the convergent boundary. In the Oregon segment of the Cascade Volcanoes that runs for 210 miles (340 km) south of Mount Hood, there are at least 1,054 Quaternary volcanoes, which form a volcanic belt 16 to 31 miles (25 to 50 km) in width. This volcanic belt extends up to 19 miles (30 km) to the north of the border with California, where Quaternary volcanic activity is interrupted by a 40-mile (64 km) gap up to the Quaternary volcanoes near Mount Shasta. The Quaternary volcanoes within the Oregon Cascades are extremely dense, concentrated within an area of about 3,700 square miles (9,500 km^{2}). Black Crater forms part of a chain of Pleistocene, northward-trending volcanic activity characterized by scoria cones, lava flows, and agglutinates. Some of this eruptive activity covered North Sister. The chain stretches for about 11 kilometres (6.8 mi) from Black Crater to North Sister. Black Crater sits above the Oregon High Cascades volcanic plateau.

Black Crater is a shield volcano, (Note: The Global Volcanism Program, Williams (1944), and Fierstein (2011) list the volcano as a shield volcano, while Hildreth (2007) lists it as a stratovolcano based on its composite materials, steepness, and high relief.) composed of mafic basaltic andesite and olivine basalt. It is part of a group of mafic shield volcanoes in central Oregon that also includes North Sister, Mount Washington, Broken Top, and Black Butte. Black Crater shows high amplitude positive polarity on magnetic anomaly maps, as do Mount Washington, Three Fingered Jack, and Mount Jefferson, suggesting an age of less than 730,000 years. The volcano was likely formed in the late Pleistocene and has not erupted for about 50,000 years. Near the end of its eruptive activity, the volcano formed cinder cones on its southwestern side and a parasitic lava cone near its western base. Scoria and agglomerate near the summit vent was likely erupted at the same time as these formations and have been intruded by dikes. Later, additional cinder cones formed on the volcano, including one at the southern base known as Millican Crater, which erupted basalt. Millican Crater runs up against Black Crater, with a width of 3,900 feet (1,200 m). It erupted a lava flow with dimensions of 1.2 by 1.9 miles (2 by 3 km), which runs south and east and has been moderately eroded by glaciers. This lava flow is made of scoria and agglutinate.

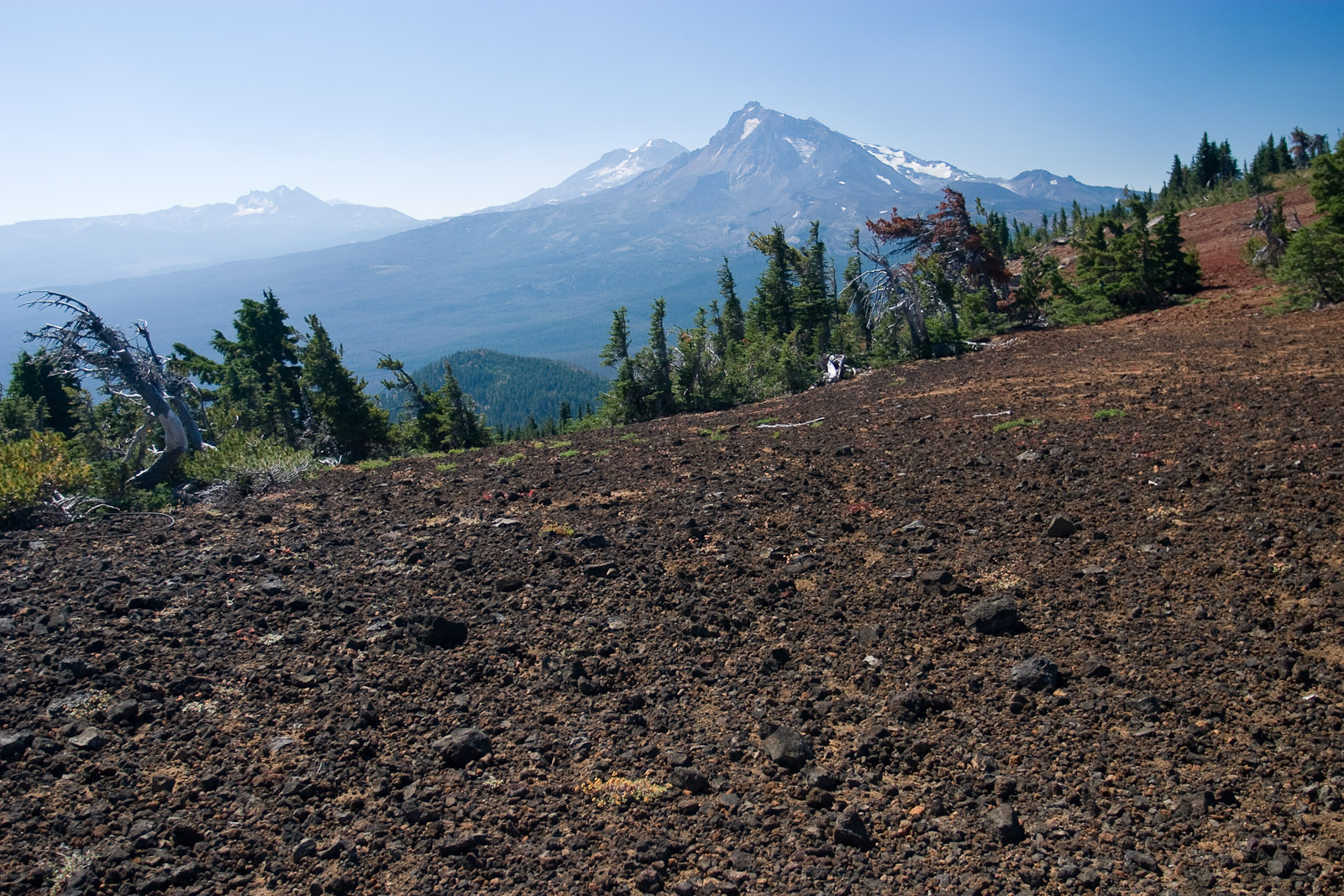
The summit of Black Crater, with the Three Sisters in the background

Cinder cones also occur at 250 feet (76 m) and 350 feet (110 m) above the northern and northeastern flanks, respectively; they are well-preserved without current glaciers but show some evidence of weathering. A crater on the northwestern slope is named Latta Crater after John Latta, an early settler in the region. The two Matthieu Lakes (located on the southern side of the volcano near its summit) are named after the French Canadian pioneer François X. Matthieu, another early settler in Oregon. Lava deposits from Black Crater are slightly porphyritic; they consist of sparse plagioclase and clinopyroxene and contain 55 to 57 percent silica. The volcano produced a lava flow that reaches north and northeast of the summit for about 2.5 to 3.1 miles (4 to 5 km). This lava extends from a central volcanic plug made of microdiorite. Due to the erosion, lava has irregular joints.

A normal fault occurs on the western side of the volcano, trending north–south. A fault scarp runs along the northern side of the volcano to the south, corresponding to an eruption at the Matthieu Lake fissure that occurred about 15,000 years ago, independent of Black Crater. The eruption was fed by a dike that could have reached the surface by the fault. The Matthieu Lake fissure runs for about 5.3 miles (8.5 km), trending north–east from north of North Sister until Black Crater. Made of basaltic andesite and andesite with silica content ranging from 53.5 to 60%, the fissure sees increasing crystallization of its products moving south with decreasing amounts of crystals and phenocrysts. The fissure consists of cinder cones and agglutinated volcanic vents that erupted cinders, volcanic bombs, and thick lava flows. The fissure has been covered by glaciers.

=== Nearby features ===
The promontory Windy Point, which is made up of basaltic andesite lava and cinder, sits at the northwestern base of Black Crater. From there, Mount Washington can be seen, as well as basaltic andesite lava from the Yapoah Crater and a lava field produced by Belknap Crater. Belknap also erupted a heavy deposit of ash and scoria that covered the area between Black Crater and Dry Creek to the north. The Sixmile Butte lava field, which formed during the Pleistocene, consists of ten cinder cones between Black Crater and Black Butte. These cones erupted basaltic andesite, which was deposited prior to the glacial advance at Suttle Lake. The field encompasses about 25 square miles (65 km^{2}). Southwest of Black Crater in Lane County, there is a small crater called Harlow Crater, named after M.H. Harlow, former President of the McKenzie toll road.

== Human history ==
Following cattle droving into the McKenzie Pass area in 1859 by missionaries and the discovery of gold in eastern Oregon in the early 1860s, the area south of McKenzie Pass was settled around 1862. The settlers arrived with wagons and more than 60 oxen and 700 cattle.They moved into the forested region south of Black Crater, near what is now the city of Sisters. The group was led by the Scott brothers, who then created the McKenzie Fork Wagon Road Company to build a road over the lava fields in the area, followed by the McKenzie River Wagon Road Company, which was formed to build a road across the Cascade Range in the vicinity of the Three Sisters volcanoes that would cross the Deschutes River. A third construction company proposed the construction of a road north of the Three Sisters that would cross the Deschutes above the mouth of its tributary, Crooked River.

== Recreation ==
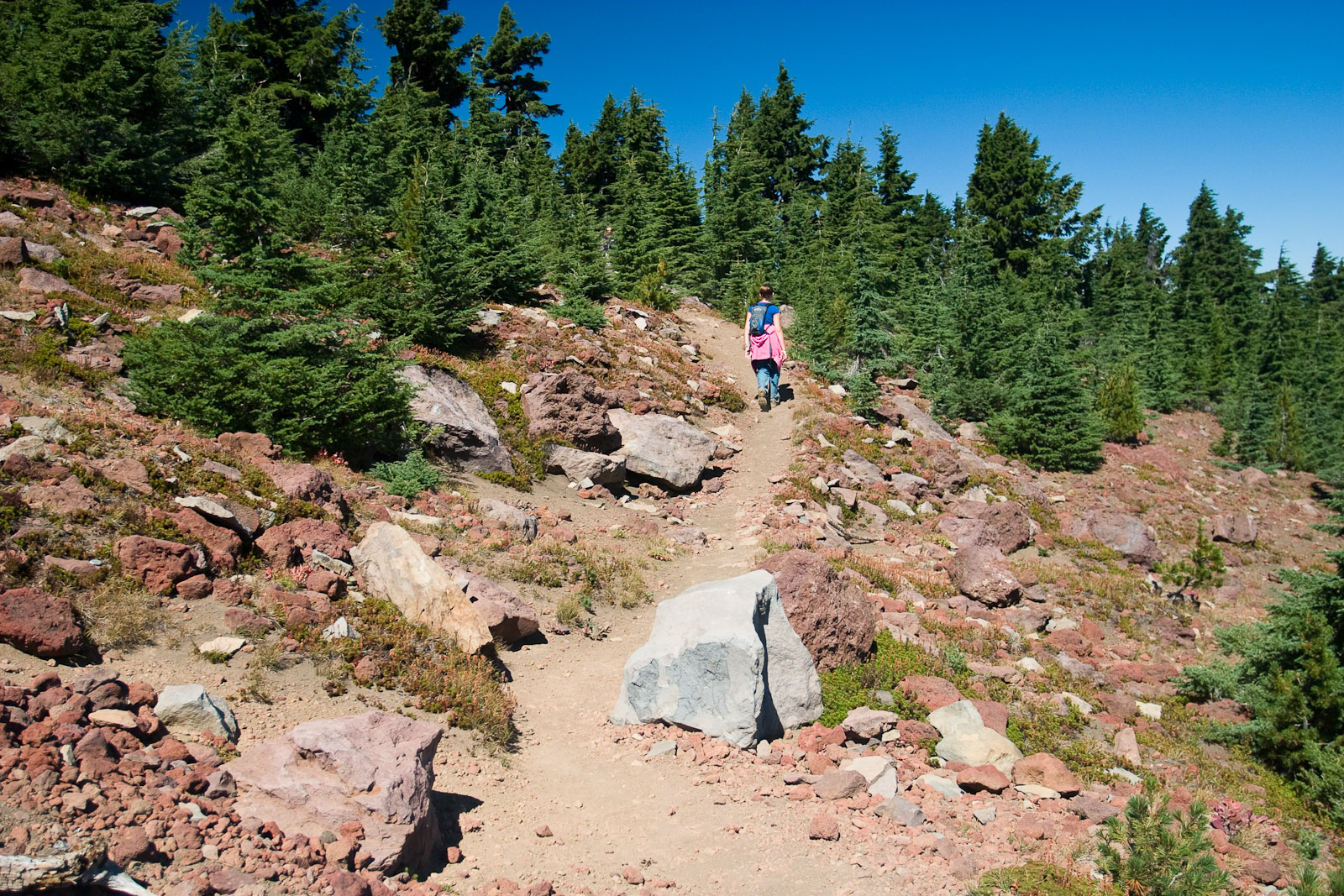
A hiker on the Black Crater trail

The Black Crater Trail runs one-way for 3.8 miles (6.1 km) from a trailhead on Oregon Route 242. It passes through the Three Sisters Wilderness and eventually reaches the summit of Black Crater, where the North Sister and Mount Washington volcanoes can be seen. The trail can be hiked or attempted on horseback, but mountain bikes and motorized vehicles are not permitted. Considered to be of intermediate difficulty for hiking, it takes on average about 4 hours to complete, ranging in elevation from 4,900 to 7,251 feet (1,494 to 2,210 m). The southeastern portion of the trail can be skied. Since 1905, All recreational activity at Black Crater has been overseen by the United States Forest Service. Forest rangers built a fire lookout tower in 1925, but it was out of service by the 1960s.

== Sources ==
- Birdseye, C.H. (1923). Triangulation and primary traverse 1916-1918 (PDF). Bulletin 709 (Report). United States Geological Survey.
- Brogan, P. F. (1969). Visitor information service book for the Deschutes National Forest: an abstract of literature, personal recollections, and interviews dealing with the Deschutes Forest. Deschutes National Forest, United States Forest Service.
- Conrey, R.; Grunder, A.; Schmidt, M. (2004). State of the Cascade Arc: stratocone persistence, mafic lava shields, and pyroclastic volcanism associated with intra-arc rift propagation (PDF). Open File Report OFR O–04-04 SOTA Field Trip Guide (Report). Oregon Department of Geology and Mineral Industries.
- Duncan, S. (December 2002). Geology as destiny: cold waters run deep in western Oregon. Science Findings (Report). Vol. 49. Portland, Oregon: United States Forest Service. pp. 1–5.
- Fierstein, J.; Hildreth, W.; Calvert, A. T. (2011). "Eruptive history of South Sister, Oregon Cascades". Journal of Volcanology and Geothermal Research. 207 (3–4): 145–179. Bibcode:2011JVGR..207..145F. doi:10.1016/j.jvolgeores.2011.06.003.
- Foote, R.W. (1986). Curie-point isotherm mapping and interpretation from aeromagnetic measurements in the northern Oregon Cascades (Thesis). Oregon State University.
- Hildreth, W.; Fierstein, J.; Calvert, A. T. (2012). Geologic map of Three Sisters volcanic cluster, Cascade Range, Oregon: U.S. Geological Survey Scientific Investigations Map 3186, pamphlet. United States Geological Survey.
- Hildreth, W. (2007). Quaternary Magmatism in the Cascades, Geologic Perspectives. United States Geological Survey. Professional Paper 1744.
- James, E. R.; Manga, M.; Rose, T. P. (September 1999). "CO2 degassing in the Oregon Cascades". Geology. 27 (9). Geological Society of America: 823–826. Bibcode:1999Geo....27..823J. doi:10.1130/0091-7613(1999)027<0823:CDITOC>2.3.CO;2.
- Joslin, L. (2005). The Wilderness Concept and the Three Sisters Wilderness: Deschutes and Willamette National Forests, Oregon. Bend, Oregon: Wilderness Associates. ISBN 978-0-9647167-4-2.
- McArthur, L. A.; McArthur, L. L. (1984) [1928]. Oregon Geographic Names (6th ed.). Portland, Oregon: Oregon Historical Society Press. ISBN 978-0-87595-237-6.
- Schmidt, M. (2006). Deep crustal and mantle inputs to North Sister Volcano, Oregon High Cascade Range (Thesis). Oregon State University.
- Sherrod, D. R.; Taylor, E. M.; Ferns, M. L.; Scott, W. E.; Conrey, R. M.; Smith, G. A. (2004). "Geologic Map of the Bend 30-×60-Minute Quadrangle, Central Oregon" (PDF). Geologic Investigations Series I–2683. Archived (PDF) from the original on March 25, 2019.
- Taylor, E. M. (1981). Johnson, D. A.; Donnelly-Nolan, J. (eds.). Road log for central High Cascade geology, Bend, Sisters, McKenzie Pass, and Santiam Pass, Oregon (PDF) (Report). Guides to some Volcanic Terranes in Washington, Idaho, Oregon, and Northern California. United States Geological Survey. pp. 59–83. Bibcode:1981usgs.rept....2J. Geological Survey Circular 838. Archived (PDF) from the original on June 21, 2020.
- Taylor, E. M. (July 1965). "Recent volcanism between Three Fingered Jack and North Sister, Oregon Cascade Range" (PDF). Ore Bin. 27 (7). Oregon Department of Geology and Mineral Industries: 121–148.
- Wall, S.A.; Roering, J.J.; Rengers, F.K. (April 1, 2020). "Runoff-initiated post-fire debris flow Western Cascades, Oregon" (PDF). Landslides. 17 (7). Springer Science+Business Media: 1649–1661. Bibcode:2020Lands..17.1649W. doi:10.1007/s10346-020-01376-9.
- Van Tilburg, C. (2011). Backcountry Ski & Snowboard Routes Oregon. Mountaineers Books.
- Williams, H. (1944). Louderback, G. D.; Anderson, C. A.; Camp, C. L.; Chaney, R. W. (eds.). "Volcanoes of the Three Sisters Region, Oregon Cascades" (PDF). Bulletin of the Department of Geological Sciences. 27 (3): 37–84.
