= Belknap Crater =

Shield volcano in the U.S. state of Oregon

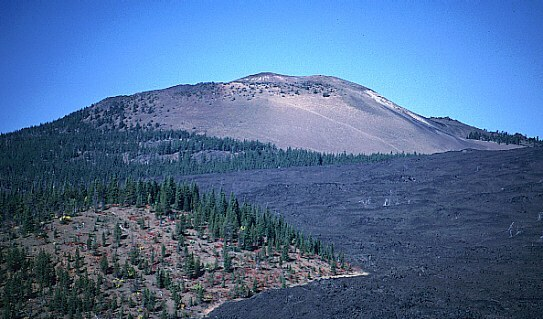
- Belknap shield volcano with lava flows in foreground

Highest point
- Elevation: 6,876 ft (2,096 m) NAVD 88
- Coordinates: 44°17′06″N 121°50′32″W

Geography
- Location within Oregon
- Location: Linn County, Oregon, U.S.
- Parent range: Cascades
- Topo map: USGS Mount Washington

Geology
- Mountain type: Shield volcano
- Volcanic arc: Cascade Volcanic Arc
- Last eruption: 480 AD

Belknap Crater is a shield volcano in the Cascade Range in the U.S. state of Oregon. Located in Linn County, it is associated with lava fields and numerous subfeatures including the Little Belknap and South Belknap volcanic cones. It lies north of McKenzie Pass and forms part of the Mount Washington Wilderness. Belknap is not forested and most of its lava flows are not vegetated, though there is some wildlife in the area around the volcano, as well as a number of tree molds formed by its eruptive activity.

Belknap was named for J. H. Belknap, whose father R. S. Belknap developed Belknap Springs. Early routes through the area extended near Belknap and its lava fields, and in the early 20th century, herds of sheep were moved to the two steptoes that lie among the Little Belknap lava flows to graze. The Oregon Skyline Trail, which runs to the west of Belknap's lava flows, follows paths used by Native American populations, who harvested huckleberries in the area. Today, there are a number of trails that run near Belknap, including ones that extend to Little Belknap and Belknap Crater. Belknap can be seen by tourists at the Dee Wright Observatory, which was built in-part with lava blocks from Belknap Crater.

A precise determination for Belknap's age has not been made, as its early history remains obscure. Belknap has likely been built up by eruptive activity over a long period of time. Belknap Crater has had four Holocene eruptive periods confirmed by geological evidence. In total, the Belknap shield and its multiple vents were formed in less than 1,500 years, its last eruptive episode finishing about 1,500 years ago. Belknap formed on the lower slopes of Mount Washington, a highly eroded volcano, and is one of the larger mafic (rich in magnesium and iron) volcanoes in the Sisters Reach.

Belknap consists of a shield volcano and pyroclastic cone and consists of basaltic and basaltic andesite lava with sub-alkaline composition, and it is characteristic of High Cascade volcanism. Well-preserved, its core is made of cinder materials; its eruptive deposits have well-preserved pressure ridges (tumuli) and levees. There are a number of subfeatures including the Inaccessible Cones, Little Belknap, South Belknap, and Twin Craters, as well as the Belknap hot springs. Postglacial, mafic eruptions are more common in the Sisters Reach — which includes Belknap — than anywhere in the Cascade volcanic arc. However, the Volcano Hazards Program of the United States Geological Survey considers it unlikely that Belknap will erupt again soon.

== Geography ==
Belknap Crater lies to the north of the Three Sisters, in the U.S. state of Oregon. Located within Linn County, it is part of the central Oregon segment of the Cascade Range. L. A. McArthur and L. L. McArthur (1984) described Belknap as "one of the important features of the Cascade Range." It lies to the north of McKenzie Pass and can be seen from McKenzie Highway.

Hildreth (2007) lists Belknap Crater's summit elevation at 6,873 feet (2,095 m). McArthur and McArthur (1984) list its elevation at 6,877 feet (2,096 m), while according to the U.S. National Geodetic Survey, Belknap reaches an elevation of 6,876 feet (2,096 m), and has a "bald" appearance. The central Belknap shield volcano has a diameter of 5 miles (8.0 km) and a volume of 2.4 cubic miles (10 km^{3}),^{[a]} with a maximum thickness of 1,700 feet (520 m). The shield has proximal and draping reliefs of 1,362 and 4,429 feet (415 and 1,350 m), which are the "difference between summit elevation and that of highest exposure of older rocks overlain by the edifice" and the "difference between summit elevation and that of lowest distal lavas of the edifice (not including distal pyroclastic or debris flows)," respectively. According to Hildreth (2007), Belknap Crater is a broad, low-angled shield volcano compared to other mafic (rich in magnesium and iron) volcanic cones. Belknap's summit cone rises about 400 feet (120 m) above the base shield volcano, and the volcano itself rises about 1,600 feet (490 m) above its surroundings.

Oregon Route 242, which follows the course of the McKenzie River, passes through the lava fields produced by Belknap Crater, the Yapoah cinder cone volcano, and a number of other volcanic vents. These fields consist of black, basaltic lava and encompass an area of 85 square miles (220 km^{2}).

== Ecology ==
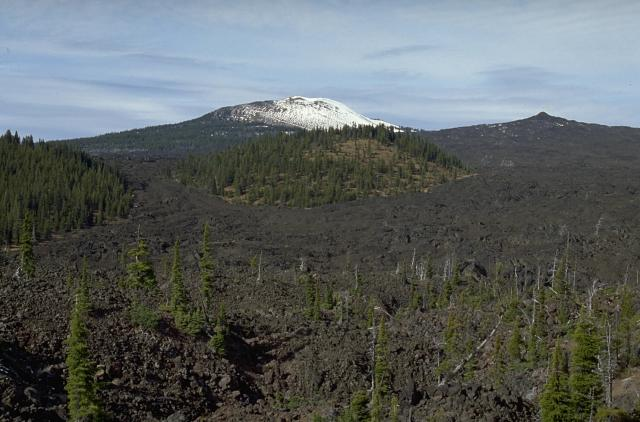
Small stands of trees near Belknap Crater

Belknap forms part of the Mount Washington Wilderness, which encompasses 54,278 acres (219.66 km^{2}) of lava and plains. Lodgepole pine trees are common, and there are 28 lakes within the wilderness area. Belknap itself is not forested and its lava flows are generally not vegetated, though there were trees growing on its lava flow deposits in the 1960s according to Taylor (1965). He observed only sparse growth of trees on lava flows from Little Belknap in a report published in the 1980s, noting that soil from Belknap was about 3-foot (0.91 m) thick and made up of lapilli and volcanic ash, which came mostly from Belknap Crater. Along the trail to Little Belknap Crater, there is a tree island with lodgepole pine, mountain hemlock, and true fir. There are also ground squirrels running around on lava flows from Belknap. Along the Oregon Skyline Trail, which passes west of Belknap, there are black-tailed and mule deer as well as lakes stocked with Eastern brook trout

Along the western flows produced by Belknap, there are several dozen tree molds, which range from 1 to 5 feet (0.30 to 1.52 m) in diameter and 6 to 15 feet (1.8 to 4.6 m) in depth. Some fell into the lava, forming hemi-cylinder-shaped trenches up to 35 feet (11 m) in length. Taylor (1965) identified a system of radial roots that were charred from the lava under soil at one of the molds. The material underwent radiocarbon dating to determine an age of 360 ± 160 years A.D.

== Geology ==
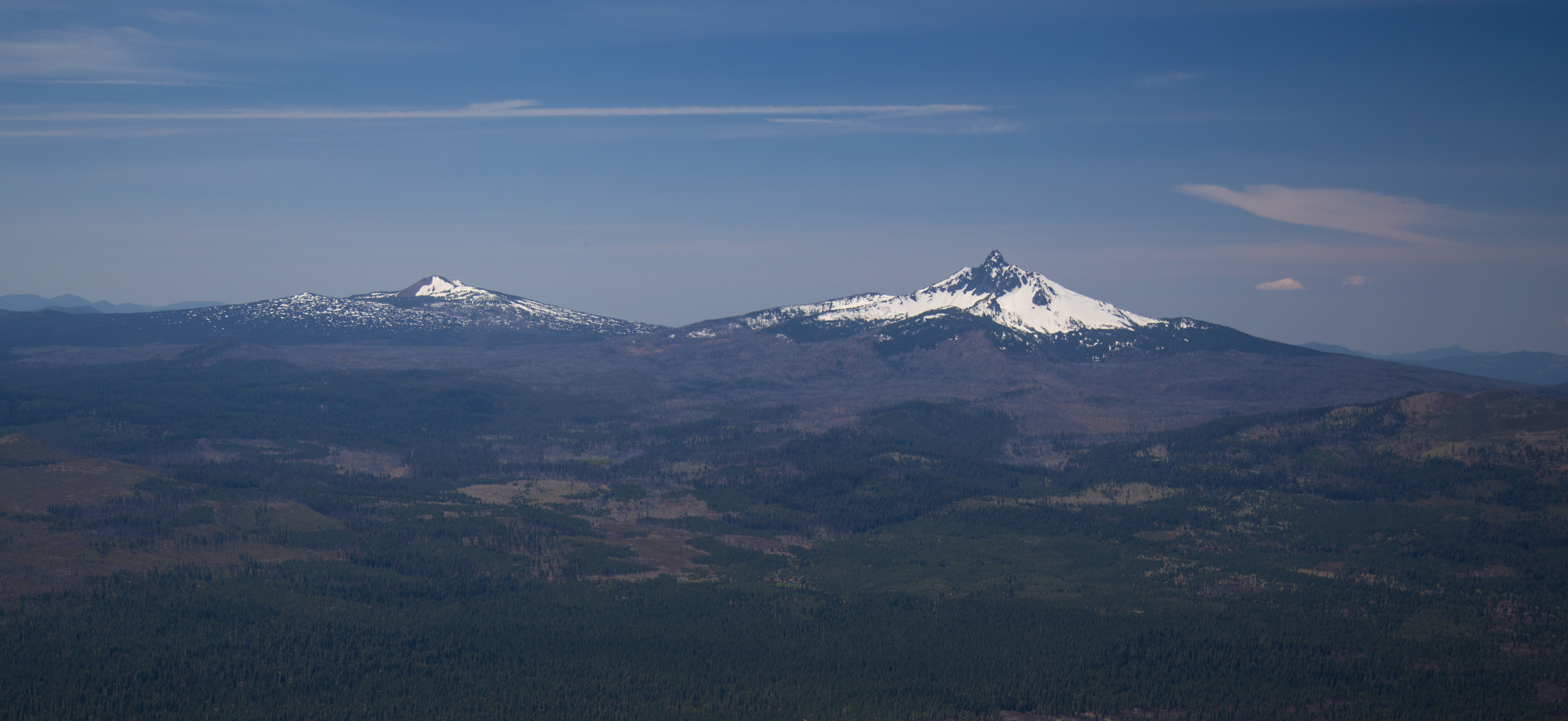
Belknap formed on the lower slopes of Mount Washington (seen on the right)

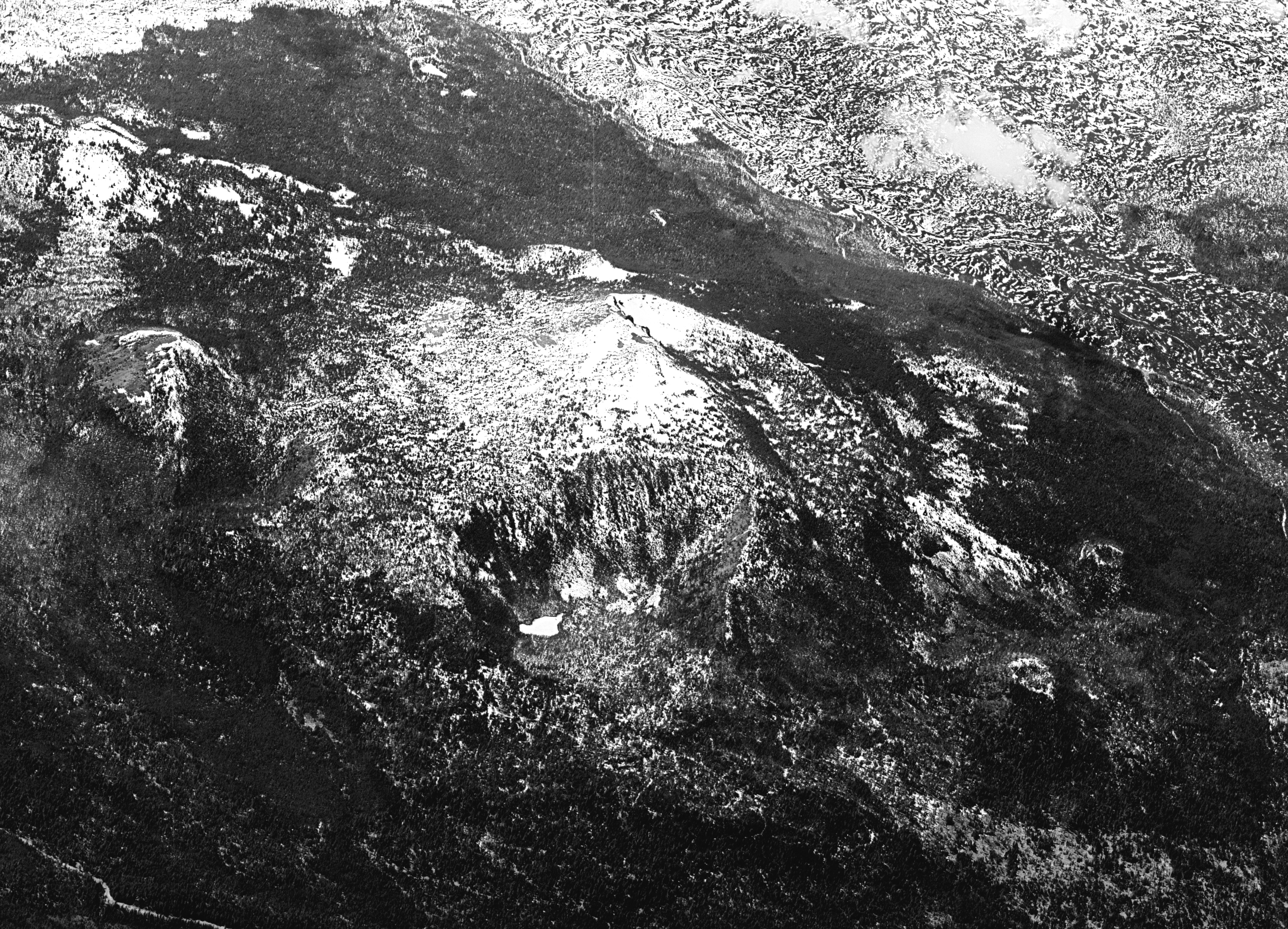
Belknap viewed from space in 1973

The Cascade Range resulted from the subduction of the Juan de Fuca tectonic plate under the North American tectonic plate, with the High Cascade subprovince in central Oregon forming about 160 to 190 miles (250 to 300 km) east of the margin of convergence. The High Cascade platform of the Cascade Volcanic Arc consists of overlapping layers of lava flows produced by shield volcanoes within the past 2 million years. The Cascade shields are steeper and smaller than Hawaiian shield volcanoes, often featuring cinder cones at their summit.

Belknap is the youngest shield volcano in the Cascade arc by far, with rugged, barren lava fields that contrast with the forested fields of older Cascade shields. It lies within the central Oregon segment of the Cascades near the Three Sisters area, which is marked by closely clustered volcanic centers that include, from south to north, Mount Bachelor, the Three Sisters, and Belknap.

Known as the Sisters Reach, the cluster abruptly broadens first to a width of 22 miles (35 km) then to 28 miles (45 km) as it approaches its southern end, running for about 56 miles (90 km) in length. There are at least 466 Quaternary volcanoes in the Sisters Reach, including several aligned segments of volcanic vents and rare eruptive units of rhyolite (uncommon elsewhere in the Cascade arc). Between the North Sister and Three Fingered Jack volcanoes, Holocene volcanism has been intense, with at least 125 volcanic centers becoming active between 4,000 and 1,300 years ago. Belknap was the last volcano to erupt in the Three Sisters area. Basaltic andesite dominates the eruptive material in the local mafic volcanoes, which range from early Pleistocene to Holocene age.

Belknap is one of the larger mafic volcanoes in the Sisters Reach, more than 30 of which run continuously along the segment. As with other mafic volcanic fields in and next to the Cascades, it does not exhibit a distinct pattern for compositional evolution over time like at the Hawaii hotspot. The area by Belknap and Mount Bachelor is marked by extensional tectonics, with a high density of mafic (rich in magnesium and iron) volcanic vents. There are clear trends among volcanic centers in the area including at Sand Mountain and Inaccessible Cone, suggesting underlying faults; according to Taylor (1965), Belknap's alignment with the Spatter Cone Chain and Blue Lake Crater might similarly indicate underlying faults or fractures connecting the vents at depth, though there are some irregularities. One important distinction is that almost all vent patterns in the area except the supposed Belknap–Blue Lake alignment individually trend north–south, no matter the alignment of the aggregate trend.

Belknap formed on the lower slopes of Mount Washington, a highly eroded volcano; Mount Washington's pinnacle lies about 3 miles (4.8 km) from Belknap. Dissolved magmatic carbon dioxide flux at Mount Washington and Belknap Crater was calculated by James et al. (1999) to be 5.3 pounds (2.4 kg) per year. Belknap consists of a shield volcano and pyroclastic cone, which form a late Holocene shield volcano complex. It is made up of basaltic and basaltic andesite lava, which is sub-alkaline. Mafic in composition, it is characteristic of High Cascade volcanism. In addition to its shield volcano vents, the Belknap complex also consists of lava flows and tephra deposits erupted from one central vent and several other flank vents. Its lava flows encompass about 39 square miles (100 km^{2}). It has a pyroclastic core. The more southern of the two craters on Belknap's summit cone has a depth of 250 feet (76 m) and width of more than 1,000 feet (300 m) at its rim.

Belknap is one of three major lava fields in its area with Sand Mountain and Yapoah–Four-in-One–Collier. Of these, Belknap is the largest, encompassing Belknap Crater's shield, Little Belknap, and South Belknap cone. Lava flows in the area have a black and glassy appearance with a vesicular texture. The basalt and basaltic andesite lava flows from Belknap include small plagioclase and olivine phenocrysts, which run for 0.039 inches (1 mm) across, as well as glomerocrysts, which are sparse and run up to 0.28 inches (7 mm) across. Some of the lava flows encased charcoal. Lava flows range from olivine basalt to basaltic andesite and generally show few signs of weathering or mineral alteration, with solid cores and outer surfaces with jagged volcanic blocks and flow breccia. The cores of lava deposits are inaccessible, except at lava tubes, lava gutters, road cuts, and quarries.

Belknap is well-preserved and serves as a good example of Holocene-era activity in the High Cascades. Its core consists of cinder, which is surrounded by a broad shield. It marks an intermediate scale between cinder cones that produced small lava flows such as Twin Craters or Yapoah and larger volcanoes like Mount Washington or Three Fingered Jack. Along with lava flows from the Sand Mountain Volcanic field and other young volcanic centers in the Santiam and McKenzie Pass area, many of the lavas produced by Belknap have crusts with slag or volcanic blocks, with a smaller number having surfaces with ropy, pāhoehoe appearances. The deposits consist of piles of basaltic andesite shards arranged in piles as a result of collapsed lava tubes and breakage of lava crusts and interior lava flows that continued moving while their exteriors cooled; Taylor (1965) wrote that Belknap "is only a pile of cinders on the summit of a vast shield of recent lava." The estimated volume of cinders at Belknap Crater is 75,000,000 cubic yards (57,000,000 m^{3}).

Belknap's volcanic deposits have well-preserved pressure ridges (tumuli) and levees on their surfaces, and they were emplaced between 7,000 and 1,300 years ago. Tephra erupted from Sand Mountain Volcanic Field and Belknap forms a thick blanket across Santiam Pass and near McKenzie Pass, with radiocarbon dating ages of 3,440 ± 250 to 1,600 years B.P. for deposits from source vents, making them younger than Mazama Ash deposits. Cinder cones near Inaccessible Cone have been nearly buried to completion by basalt and basaltic andesite erupted from Belknap. Belknap's ash deposits are recognizable by their dark color among road cuts and at near the base of lava flow margins.

=== Notable vents and subfeatures ===
Name	Elevation	Coordinates
Belknap Crater	6,876 feet (2,096 m)	44°17′06″N 121°50′32″W
Inaccessible Cones	4,869 ft (1,484 m)	44°18′12″N 121°54′23″W
Little Belknap	6,306 ft (1,922 m)	44°16′57″N 121°49′34″W
South Belknap	5,863 ft (1,787 m)	44°16′03″N 121°50′42″W
Twin Craters	5,285 ft (1,611 m)	44°15′12″N 121°53′09″W

Little Belknap shield, formed about 3,000 years ago, sits to the right of a 490-foot (150 m) high scoria cone of the main Belknap Crater vent, with Mount Washington located to the right of both cones. It is about 1 mile (1.6 km) east of Belknap shield's summit craters. Erupted on the flank of the much more extensive Belknap Crater, which also has its own secondary eruptive vents, Little Belknap lacks scoria cones, potentially because it was fed by magma that was degassed prior to its eruption.

Eruptions at Little Belknap were "quiet", but voluminous, creating the separate shield, which is topped with cinders and lava blocks with collapsed lava tubes radiating outward. A western tube forms a confluence with a vertical conduit that has a diameter of about 20 feet (6.1 m). Little Belknap's lava flows extended to within 1 mile (1.6 km) of Windy Point to the east and McKenzie Pass to the southeast, forming deposits over ash from Belknap Crater and covered by lava flows from Yapoah Cone. Along the Skyline Trail, one of the lava flows from Little Belknap peeled back on itself as it cooled, creating overturned slabs of hardened lava with widths up to 10 feet (3.0 m) and lengths up to 50 feet (15 m). The blocks are often parallel to the lava's flow direction; Taylor (1965) called them "lava curls".

There is a small lava cave system near the summit of Little Belknap, which has spatter material for a roof. The cave system is short with a number of lava tubes. At the bottom of the conduit lies another system of lava tubes, which served as a drain to create a lava tube system with two levels that are connected by this open conduit, which C. E. Skinner (1982) calls "quite unusual." The open vertical conduit cave has a diameter of 20 feet (6.1 m), dropping 24 feet (7.3 m) between the upper and lower cave systems. It has an ovular shape and a remelted lining with stalactites made from lava.

South Belknap is a small volcano 1 mile (1.6 km) to the south of Belknap, which was breached on its southwestern side by lava flows that also extended over Belknap Crater's southern base. Early lava flows near South Belknap were covered by a later lava flow, which was produced by a vent located about 300 feet (91 m) northwestward. This lava flow also overlapped with the western part of Belknap Crater's lava, and then it reached Lake Valley, where it formed the northern shore of the local Hand Lake. A deposit of alluvium abuts the margin of South Belknap's lava deposits.

On top of Belknap Crater, there is a 400-foot (120 m) high cinder cone, which may be the surface extension of the inner pyroclastic core. Within it are three craters, all of different size, which align along a north–northwestern trend. The southern crater is large and produced most of the tephra that covers the surrounding area; the northernmost crater is smaller and erupted ash and a lava flow, which breached the rim of the crater. The Little Belknap volcano erupted lava flows that formed steptoes out of two hills by surrounding them with black, basalt. Its most recent eruptions filled its crater and created a mound of red rock with clinkers; there are a number of collapsed lava tubes diverging radially from the crater.

Besides the volcanic vents related to Belknap Crater, there are two volcanoes south of Belknap which were also recently active: Four-in-One Cone and Collier Cone. Another, unnamed cone at the northern end of Inaccessible Cone's alignment, which rises to a height of 300 feet (91 m), was breached on its western and southwestern sides by gray basalt lava, which is older than Sand Mountain Volcanic Field and Belknap. There may have been a large lava field in the glacier valley north of the Twin Craters cone, but any evidence is now buried under the Belknap shield. There is a glaciated steptoe (island) in the western part of the Belknap lava field. Deposits from Belknap buried older lava flows from the Sand Mountain Volcanic Field as well as a series of four cinder cones located about 3.5 miles (5.6 km) to the southwest of Mount Washington. There are also deposits from Belknap in the Lake Valley region between Belknap and both Sims Butte and Mount Mazama.

There are hot springs, known as the Belknap Hot Springs, on the northern bank of the McKenzie River. Located in Lane County, they were discovered by R. S. Belknap in November 1869. They lie 4 miles (6.4 km) to the southwest of the wilderness area, ejecting water at a rate of 75 U.S. gallons (280 L) per minute with a temperature of 180 °F (82 °C). The hot springs are indicative of a fault that underlies the Cascade Volcanoes, onto which the east side dropped down and lava intrusions formed volcanic centers.

== Eruptive history ==
Eruptions at Belknap Crater built up the main shield volcano over repeated activity from vents surrounding a composite summit cone. The lava had a fluid character, leading to inundation of an area that encompassed more than 37 square miles (96 km^{2}). Rather than forming extensive streams, the lava settled into shorter channels that intersected, leaving complicated drainage patterns. The volcano sits on top of the thick and extensive lava deposits left behind. Belknap Crater has been the focal point for Holocene volcanism producing basaltic and basaltic andesitic lava in its vicinity, which was complex and sustained over a long period of time.

According to the Global Volcanism Program, Belknap Crater had four Holocene eruptive periods confirmed by geological evidence including corrected radiocarbon dating and magnetism; their durations are not known.^{[b]} The first took place in 5050 BCE, producing the Tamolitch lava flow. The next eruptive event, which took place in 1030 BCE ± 300 years, had a VEI of 0 and took place at Little Belknap. The subsequent eruption at South Belknap and Twin Craters occurred in 800 BCE ± 300 years and had a VEI of 2 (Strombolian/Vulcanian); it was followed by the most recent identified event at Belknap Crater in 480, which also had a VEI of 2. According to the Global Volcanism Program, these four eruptions took place during the Holocene:

Start Date	End Date	VEI	Evidence for eruption	Name of unit or activity area
5050 BCE	Unknown	Unknown	Magnetism	Tamolitch lava flow
1030 BCE ± 300 years	Unknown	0	Radiocarbon dating	Little Belknap
800 BCE ± 300 years^{[c]}	Unknown	2	Radiocarbon dating	South Belknap and Twin Craters
480	Unknown	2	Radiocarbon dating	Belknap Crater

A precise determination for Belknap's age has not been made, as its early history remains obscure, though it is likely that Belknap has been built up by eruptive activity over a long period of time. Belknap's oldest exposed lava deposits are located on the eastern flanks of the volcano, produced by vents that may have been buried by later activity. They coursed mostly to the northeast and split into two lobes on both sides of the Dugout Butte ridge, extending about 7 miles (11 km) from their source vent, along the eastern edges of the Deschutes National Forest.

Between 3,000 and 1,500 years ago during the late Holocene epoch, the Belknap shield volcano as well as the Belknap Crater cone and Little Belknap shield volcano erupted, generating lava flows that spread throughout the McKenzie Pass area. Belknap Crater's lava flows were produced from its northeastern base and extended 9.3 miles (15 km) to the west, reaching the McKenzie River valley. These events represent one of the largest periods of recent volcanism in the Cascade Range, and were comparable in terms of effusion rates to the formation of Mount Bachelor.

The initial eruptions generated tephra, which covered an extensive area to the northeast and southeast, as well as basaltic lava flows that extended 6 miles (9.7 km) from the burgeoning shield volcano edifice to the east. Thin scoria deposits occur west of Belknap; on the eastern slopes, lava deposits are covered with black ash and fine cinders. There is also an ash blanketing an expansive area from Dry Creek to the north to Black Crater to the south, with ash deposits as far as 8 miles (13 km) eastward. These eruptions were produced from two, deep craters on top of Belknap's cone, forming lapilli tuff on their eastern rim walls. There are also thick rocks in the walls of the more southern crater, as well as some lava that breached the southwestern rim, which has been obscured by spatter. The northern crater contains spindle volcanic bombs at its western rim, which reach up to 3 feet (0.91 m) in length. A broad pit formed at the northern base of Belknap's cone, running for 200 feet (61 m) in length, and was likely blasted through a bocca. According to Taylor (1965), a strong prevailing wind moving east influenced the distribution of ash and cinders on Belknap's rim.

Eruptions during a subsequent phase about 2,900 years ago built a smaller shield volcano, Little Belknap. According to Sherrod et al. (2004), lava from Little Belknap formed a tree mold in the southern part of the Sand Mountain volcanic field, which was dated to 2,883 ± 175 years Before Present (B.P.) via radiocarbon dating. Sherrod et al. (2004) also describe charcoal detected under a lava flow that coursed down Belknap Crater's western flank, which yielded two radiocarbon dating ages: 1,590 ± 160 years B.P. and 1,400 ± 100 years B.P. These ages have overlap at the level of statistical certainty, indicating that they could have been erupted nearly simultaneously or as far apart as 800 years. Both flows came from the shield volcano's summit vent. Early lava flows at Belknap were erupted from actively erupting volcanic vents before Little Belknap formed, as demonstrated by stratigraphy.

A third eruptive period constructed the bulk of the volcanic complex with basaltic andesite lava from Belknap Crater's central vent about 1,500 years ago. This cone-building phase was also fed by eruptions about 1,700 years ago at a vent about 1 mile (1.6 km) to the south, South Belknap. According to Sherrod et al. (2004), South Belknap formed charred roots at a tree mold with a radiocarbon dating age of 2,635 ± 50 years B.P., the same site that Taylor used to determine an age of 1,775 ± 400 years B.P. Taylor also argues that the cone was breached about 1,800 years ago before it was surrounded by basaltic andesite lava flows from another vent about 1,500 years ago. Sherrod et al. argue that the older date (2,635 ± 50 years B.P.) is more accurate because the deposit contains concentrated amounts of the cosmogenic nuclide isotope ^{3}He, which would require a longer surface exposure than Taylor's calculation would allow, at least 2,000 years B.P.

A final eruptive phase produced lava flows that extended 9 miles (14 km) to the west into the McKenzie River valley, also coursing to the north and south. These lava deposits have ropy surfaces and feature squeeze-ups between broken platforms of crust. The lava that moved south crossed over more ancient lava from Twin Craters, while the lava that ran to the west covered lava and cinder cones within the Inaccessible Cone lineament. The west-moving lavas also moved over Sand Mountain lava flows (erupted from the southern group of vents and the southern vent of Sand Mountain itself), entering the McKenzie Canyon. The lava from this eruption significantly influenced the McKenzie River, creating the upstream swamp known as Beaver Marsh, with the remnants of these lava streams now forming permeable sediment talus for the McKenzie River, which disappears into them before re-emerging at Tamolitch Falls. Erosion has altered the area downstream from these falls to a lateral terrace on the wall of the McKenzie Canyon, 30 feet (9.1 m) above the river water level.

In total, the Belknap shield and its multiple vents were formed in less than 1,500 years, which was a comparable effusion rate to the Nash Crater scoria cone, the Sand Mountain Volcanic Field, and the Mount Bachelor chain. Eruption rates for Belknap were high, at 1.2 cubic miles (5 km^{3}) per 1,000 years, similar to the buildup of rhyodacite before the climactic eruption at Mount Mazama. Within the last 15,000 years, Cascades volcanoes have erupted about 70 cubic miles (290 km^{3}) of material excluding rear-arc volcanoes. Of this, about 15 cubic miles (61 km^{3}) (21 percent) came from 63 distributed or peripheral cones, shields, or mafic and intermediate composition chains, with Belknap and Mount Bachelor contributing 71 percent of that material. Over the course of its eruptive history, Belknap erupted 1.4 to 2.2 cubic miles (6 to 9 km^{3}) of material with several eruptive pulses.

=== Recent activity and potential hazards ===
Postglacial, mafic eruptions are more common in the Sisters Reach — which includes Belknap — than anywhere in the Cascade volcanic arc. A lava flow lies next to South Cinder Peak, the Nash Crater–Lost Lake cone cluster, Sand Mountain Volcanic Field, Inaccessible Cone chain, Blue Lake Crater, and a number of monogenetic scoria cones and chains. The McKenzie and Santiam Pass area saw more than a dozen distinct mafic eruptions between 4,500 and 1,100 years ago according to radiocarbon dating, which corresponded to a pulse of mafic eruptions in the late Holocene epoch. Other nearby mafic eruptive units occur at Sims Butte, Cayuse Crater, LeConte Crater, Mount Bachelor, the Egan Cone cluster, and the Katsuk-Talapus chain, which likely were all emplaced between 18,000 and 8,000 years ago. At the south of Sisters Reach, there is a postglacial, basalt lava flow that lies on the eastern flank of Sitkum Butte (a cone that is older than this lava flow). The recent eruptive activity at Belknap Crater means that it is one of the youngest mafic volcanoes in the Oregon Cascades.

There are about 6,500 people living within 19 miles (30 km) of Belknap Crater, with a population of about 362,000 within 62 miles (100 km). However, most eruption hazards from basaltic volcanoes are generally restricted to within 9.3 miles (15 km) of the vent, with some exceptions. According to the Volcano Hazards Program of the United States Geological Survey's Cascades Volcano Observatory, the threat potential from Belknap is "Low/Very Low". It does not seem likely that Belknap Crater will erupt again, though eruptions with similar characteristics to its past eruptions might occur in the surrounding area, disrupting transportation on major highways in the vicinity including U.S. Route 20, Oregon Route 22, and Oregon Route 242. The eruption of tephra could pose a threat to surrounding communities, particularly within central Oregon to the east. High-volume lahars (mudflows or debris flows composed of a mix of pyroclastic material, rocky debris, and water) would travel far to the west. Moreover, low-volume lahars from eruptions would likely enter the McKenzie River valley, which is broad and fairly gently sloped, where they might move downstream through flood plains or small channels. Near Belknap Springs and McKenzie Bridge, deposits from the eruption could also block off water upstream, leading to downstream lahars and floods.

== Human history ==
Belknap was named for J. H. Belknap, who lived along the McKenzie River and was the son of R. S. Belknap, responsible for developing Belknap Springs. J. H. Belknap had an interest in the toll road constructed over McKenzie Pass during the early 1870s. The Belknap family came to the state of Oregon in 1847 with the Orem family, followed by G. Belknap and J. Belknap in 1848. The Belknap Springs in Lane County were found by R. S. Belknap in November 1869 and developed them, and he became the postmaster for the Salt Springs post office, which was established in October 1874. The name for the Salt Springs office changed to Belknaps Springs in June 1875, then Belknap Springs in 1891.

During the days of the American pioneer, the Santiam and McKenzie passes were the two major routes through the Deschutes Forest area, eventually transforming into highways for Oregon's interior. The Willamette Pass to the south was used as a route by travelers as early as 1853, noting its difficult as the "route was far from a road." Still, the road was heavily used in spite of its poor conditions, later becoming the Willamette Pass Highway, better known as Oregon Route 58. In 1862, the Scott brothers and colleagues formed the McKenzie Fork Wagon Road Company to create a better road passing over lava fields in the area, then later the McKenzie River Wagon Road Company, which had as its objective a road that crossed the Cascade Range near the Three Sisters volcano complex at the Deschutes River. A third group followed that aimed to forge a road across the Deschutes north of the Sisters. The original route pursued by the Scott brothers reached the Belknap hot springs.

In the early 20th century, herds of sheep were moved to the two steptoes that lie among the Little Belknap lava flows to graze. The Oregon Skyline Trail, which runs to the west of Belknap's lava flows, follows paths used by Native American populations, who harvested huckleberries in the area.

== Recreation ==
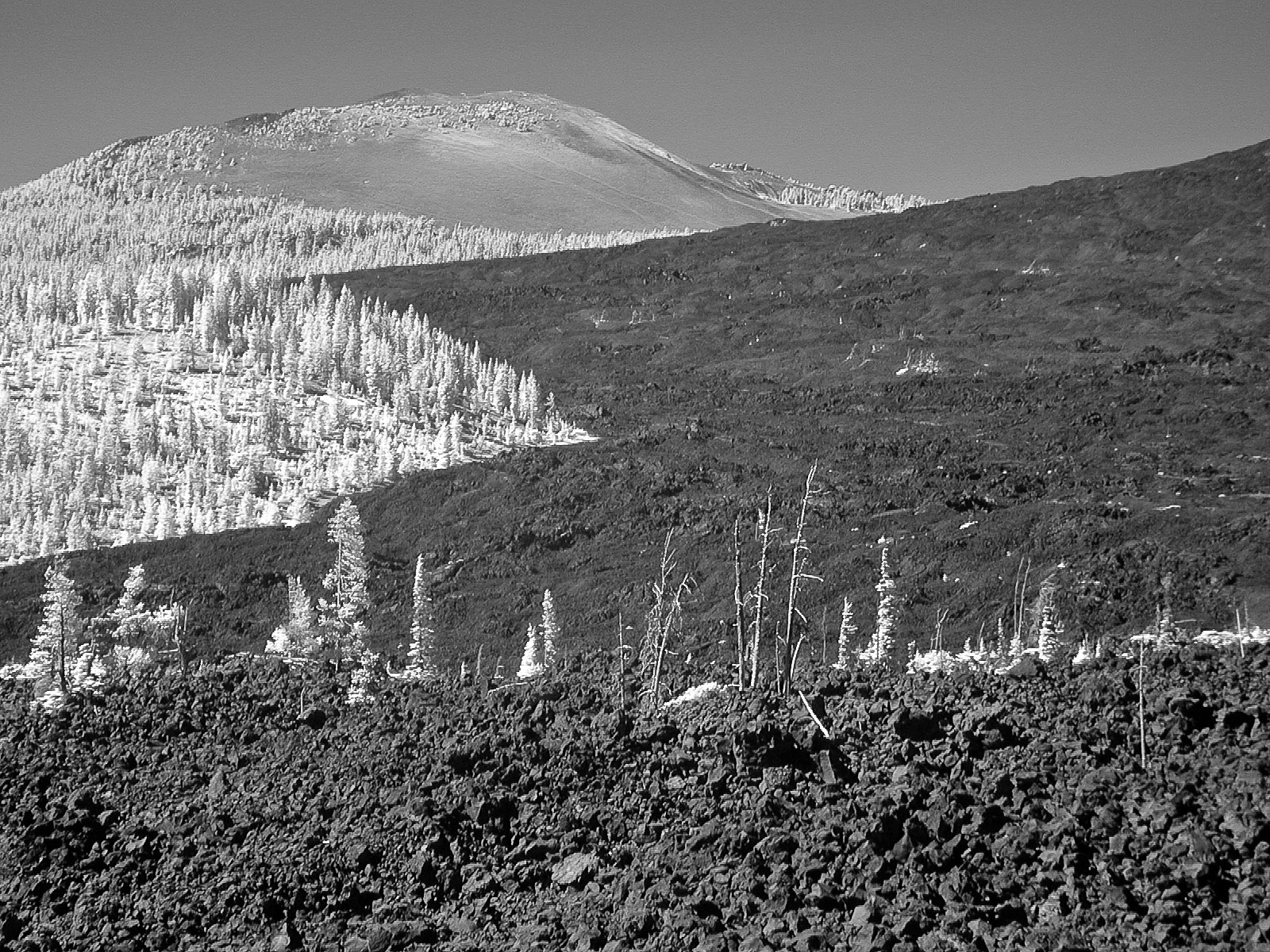
Belknap as seen from the Dee Wright Observatory

The Dee Wright Observatory was built with lava blocks from the lava fields produced by Belknap, Yapoah cinder cone, and other volcanoes. It offers views of local volcanoes; Belknap lies to the north. Both Belknap Crater and Little Belknap Crater can be reached from spurs of the Pacific Crest Trail. The round trip from intersection of the Pacific Crest Trail and Oregon Route 242 to Little Belknap Crater is about 5.6 miles (9.0 km) and ranges in elevation from 5,350 to 6,250 feet (1,630 to 1,900 m), with an easy to moderate difficulty level. The round trip to Belknap Crater is about 6.8 miles (10.9 km) from the trailhead and is more difficult owing to the steep climb to the summit on fine cinders.

The trail offers views of nearby Mount Washington, Black Crater, and the Three Sisters, as well as lava features. Trees and other forms of wildlife are rare along the trail. There is also a trail that extends to Belknap Crater, which runs about 6.8 miles (10.9 km) round trip, with an intermediate difficulty level. It can also be skied. The Oregon Skyline Trail, part of which runs for 38 miles (61 km) through the Deschutes National Forest, passes westward of the Belknap lava fields. It has been recognized as a major scenic route since 1920.

== Notes ==
- [a] This volume comes from Hildreth (2007); Taylor (1981) estimated its volume to be 1.3 cubic miles (5.4 km^{3}).
- [b] Taylor (1990) lists three principal eruptive episodes between about 3,000 and 1,500 years Before Present (BP). However, he still lists the four eruptions that the Cascades Volcano Observatory and Global Volcanism Program describe; he considers the two most recent eruptions to be part of the third major eruptive phase.
- [c] Sherrod et al. (2004) disagree with this date for the eruptive phase at South Belknap. As mentioned in the text, Sherrod et al. calculated a radiocarbon dating age of 2,635 ± 50 years B.P. for the same site that Taylor used to generate this estimated age, which is equivalent to 1,775 ± 400 years B.P.

== Sources ==
- Bishop, E. M.; Allen, J. E. (2004). Hiking Oregon's geology. The Mountaineers Books. ISBN 978-0-89886-847-0.
- Brogan, P. F. (1969). Visitor information service book for the Deschutes National Forest: an abstract of literature, personal recollections, and interviews dealing with the Deschutes Forest. Deschutes National Forest, United States Forest Service.
- Dunegan, L. (2018). Best Easy Day Hikes: Bend and Central Oregon (3 ed.). Rowman & Littlefield. ISBN 978-1-4930-3032-3.
- Harris, S. L. (2005). Fire Mountains of the West: The Cascade and Mono Lake Volcanoes (Third ed.). Mountain Press Publishing Company. ISBN 978-0-87842-511-2.
- Heinrichs, D. F. (October 1973). "Paleomagnetic study of recent Cascade lavas, Three Sisters, Oregon". Journal of Geophysical Research. 78 (26). American Geophysical Union: 5983–5992. Bibcode:1973JGR....78.5983H. doi:10.1029/JB078i026p05983.
- Hildreth, W. (2007). Quaternary magmatism in the Cascades: geologic perspectives. United States Geological Survey. ISBN 978-1-4113-1945-5. ISSN 1044-9612. Professional Paper 1744.
- Hildreth, W.; Fierstein, J.; Calvert, A. T. (2012). Geologic map of Three Sisters volcanic cluster, Cascade Range, Oregon (PDF) (Map). 1:24,000. United States Geological Survey. U.S. Geological Survey Scientific Investigations Map 3186.
- Hoblitt, R. P.; Miller, C. D.; Scott, W. E. (1987). "Volcanic hazards with regard to siting nuclear-power plants in the Pacific Northwest" (PDF). Open-File Report. United States Geological Survey. Bibcode:1987usgs.rept...82H. doi:10.3133/ofr87297. Open-File Report 87-297.
- James, E. R.; Manga, M.; Rose, T. P. (September 1999). "CO2 degassing in the Oregon Cascades". Geology. 27 (9). Geological Society of America: 823–826. Bibcode:1999Geo....27..823J. doi:10.1130/0091-7613(1999)027<0823:CDITOC>2.3.CO;2.
- McArthur, L. A.; McArthur, L. L. (1984) [1928]. Oregon Geographic Names (6th ed.). Portland, Oregon: Oregon Historical Society Press. ISBN 978-0-87595-237-6.
- Ostertag, R.; Ostertag, G. (2003). Best Short Hikes in Northwest Oregon. The Mountaineers Books. ISBN 978-0-89886-880-7.
- Scott, W. E.; Iverson, R. M.; Schilling, S. P.; Fisher, B. J. (2001). "Volcano hazards in the Three Sisters region, Oregon" (PDF). Open-File Report. United States Geological Survey. doi:10.3133/ofr99437. Open-File Report 99-437.
- Sherrod, D. R.; Taylor, E. M.; Ferns, M. L.; Scott, W. E.; Conrey, R. M.; Smith, G. A. (2004). "Geologic Map of the Bend 30-×60-Minute Quadrangle, Central Oregon" (PDF). Geologic Investigations Series I–2683.
- Skinner, C. E. (1982). "Open vertical volcanic conduits: a preliminary investigation of an unusual volcanic cave form with examples from Newberry Volcano and the Central High Cascades of Oregon" (PDF). Proceedings of the Third International Symposium on Vulcanospeleology: A Special Session of the 39th. Annual Convention of the National Speleological Society. Bend, Oregon: International Speleological Society. pp. 7–17.
- Taylor, E. M. (1990). "Belknap". In Wood, C. A.; Kienle, J. (eds.). Volcanoes of North America. Cambridge University Press. p. 182. ISBN 978-0-521-43811-7.
- Taylor, E. M. (1981). Johnson, D. A.; Donnelly-Nolan, J. (eds.). Road log for central High Cascade geology, Bend, Sisters, McKenzie Pass, and Santiam Pass, Oregon (PDF) (Report). Guides to some Volcanic Terranes in Washington, Idaho, Oregon, and Northern California. United States Geological Survey. pp. 59–83. Bibcode:1981usgs.rept....2J. Geological Survey Circular 838.
- Taylor, E. M. (1968). "Roadside geology, Santiam and McKenzie Pass Highways, Oregon" (PDF). In Dole, H. M. (ed.). Andesite Conference Guidebook. Oregon Department of Geology and Mineral Industries. pp. 3–33. Oregon Department of Geology and Mineral Industries Bulletin 62.
- Taylor, E. M.; Causey, J. D. (1984). Marsh, S. P.; Kropschot, S. J.; Dickinson, R. G. (eds.). Mount Washington Wilderness, Oregon (Report). Wilderness mineral potential: Assessment of mineral-resource potential in U.S. Forest Service lands studied in 1964-1984. United States Geological Survey. pp. 893–895. doi:10.3133/pp1300. Geological Survey Professional Paper Issue 1300, Volume 2.
- Taylor, E. M.; Causey, J. D.; MacLeod, N. S. (1983). Geology and mineral resource potential map of the Mount Washington Wilderness, Deschutes, Lane and Linn Counties, Oregon (PDF) (Report). United States Geological Survey. doi:10.3133/ofr83662. Open-File Report 83-662.
- Taylor, E. M. (July 1965). "Recent volcanism between Three Fingered Jack and North Sister, Oregon Cascade Range, Part I: History of Volcanic Activity" (PDF). Ore Bin. 27 (7). Oregon Department of Geology and Mineral Industries: 121–148.
- Van Tilburg, C. (2011). Backcountry Ski & Snowboard Routes Oregon. The Mountaineers Books. ISBN 978-1-59485-516-0.
- Williams, I. A. (May 1916). "Some little-known scenic pleasure places in the Cascade Range in Oregon". Mineral Resources of Oregon. 2. Oregon Bureau of Mines and Geology.
