= Dee Wright Observatory =

Observation structure in the Cascade Mountains, Oregon

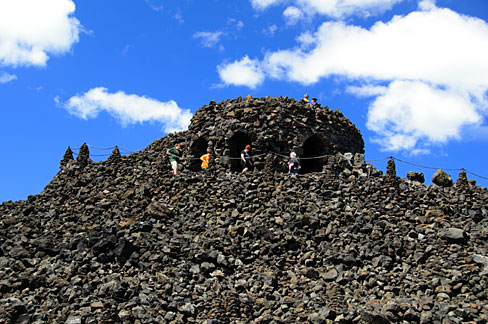
- Observatory at the summit of McKenzie Pass
- Interactive map of Dee Wright Observatory
- Location: McKenzie Pass, Lane County, Oregon, United States
- Coordinates: 44.260556°N 121.801222°W
- Created: 1935
- Operator: U.S. Forest Service

Dee Wright Observatory is an observation structure at the summit of McKenzie Pass in the Cascade Mountains of Oregon. The structure is an open shelter constructed with lava stone. It is located in the midst of a large lava flow, and offers an exceptional view of numerous Cascade peaks.

== Location ==
Dee Wright Observatory is located in the Willamette National Forest 15 miles (24 km) west of Sisters, Oregon on Route 242. The highway is part of the McKenzie-Santiam Pass Scenic Byway. McKenzie Pass is 5,325 feet (1,623 m) above sea level, and winter snow and the narrow road surface requires McKenzie Pass to be closed to motor vehicles from November to July each year. It is at times accessible to cyclists when the road is closed to vehicles.

== Structure ==
The observatory is an open shelter built with basaltic andesite lava found at the construction site. The viewing windows are cut to specifically highlight the neighboring mountains. These "lava tube" viewing holes allow visitors to easily identify the different Cascade peaks. There is also a 36 inch (90 cm) diameter, bronze azimuth-like "peak finder" on the observatory’s roof to help visitors locate nearby geologic features as well as the surrounding mountain peaks. From the top of the observatory, visitors have a panoramic view of the Cascade Mountain Range including Mount Hood in the far north.

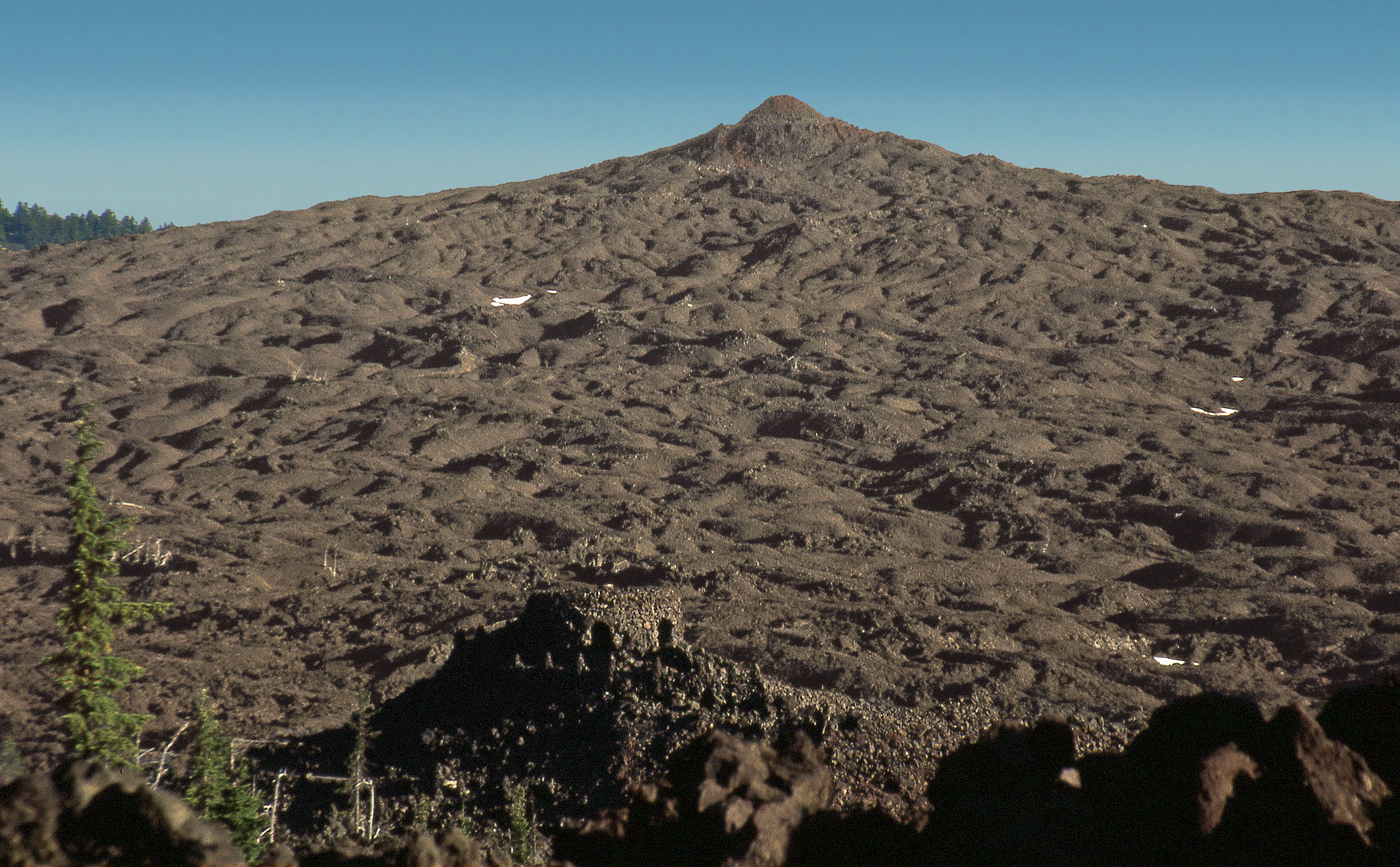
Observatory at base of Little Belknap volcanic vent

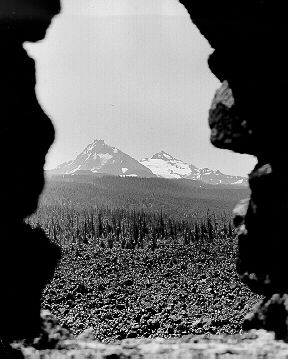
Cascade peaks seen through lava tube viewing hole at Dee Wright Observatory

Many peaks can easily be seen from Dee Wright Observatory: Mount Jefferson, Cache Mountain, Dugout Butte, Black Butte, Bluegrass Butte, Black Crater, North Sister, Middle Sister, Little Brother (and ridge west), Condon Butte, Scott Mountain, South Belknap Cone, Belknap Crater, Little Belknap, and Mount Washington. Mount Hood, Bald Peter, Green Ridge, and Horsepasture Mountain can also be seen from the observatory during good weather.

The half-mile long Lava River Interpretive Trail begins at the observatory, and takes visitors on a 30-minute walk through lava beds. The trail is paved and easy to follow. Interpretive panels, located along the trail highlight the geology of the area. The trail also offers open vistas of the surrounding landscape.

== History ==
McKenzie Pass follows the path of an 1860 wagon route. The route emerges from the forest and crosses a 65-square-mile (170 km^{2}) lava flow. At the summit, the wagon road had to be cut through the lava beds. As a result, alternate routes over the Cascades were used by most early travelers. Today’s highway follows the wagon route over the lava beds past the observatory site.

The observatory was built during the Great Depression by a Civilian Conservation Corps crew at Camp Belknap near Clear Lake. It was completed in 1935, and named for the construction crew’s foreman who had died the previous year after serving 24 years as a Forest Service packer and crew foreman at Camp Belknap.

In addition to Dee Wright Observatory, the rough-hewn timber shelter built by the Civilian Conservation Corps at Camp Belknap still stands near Clear Lake. Both sites are maintained by the United States Forest Service. Today, Dee Wright Observatory is visited by thousands of travelers crossing McKenzie Pass each summer.

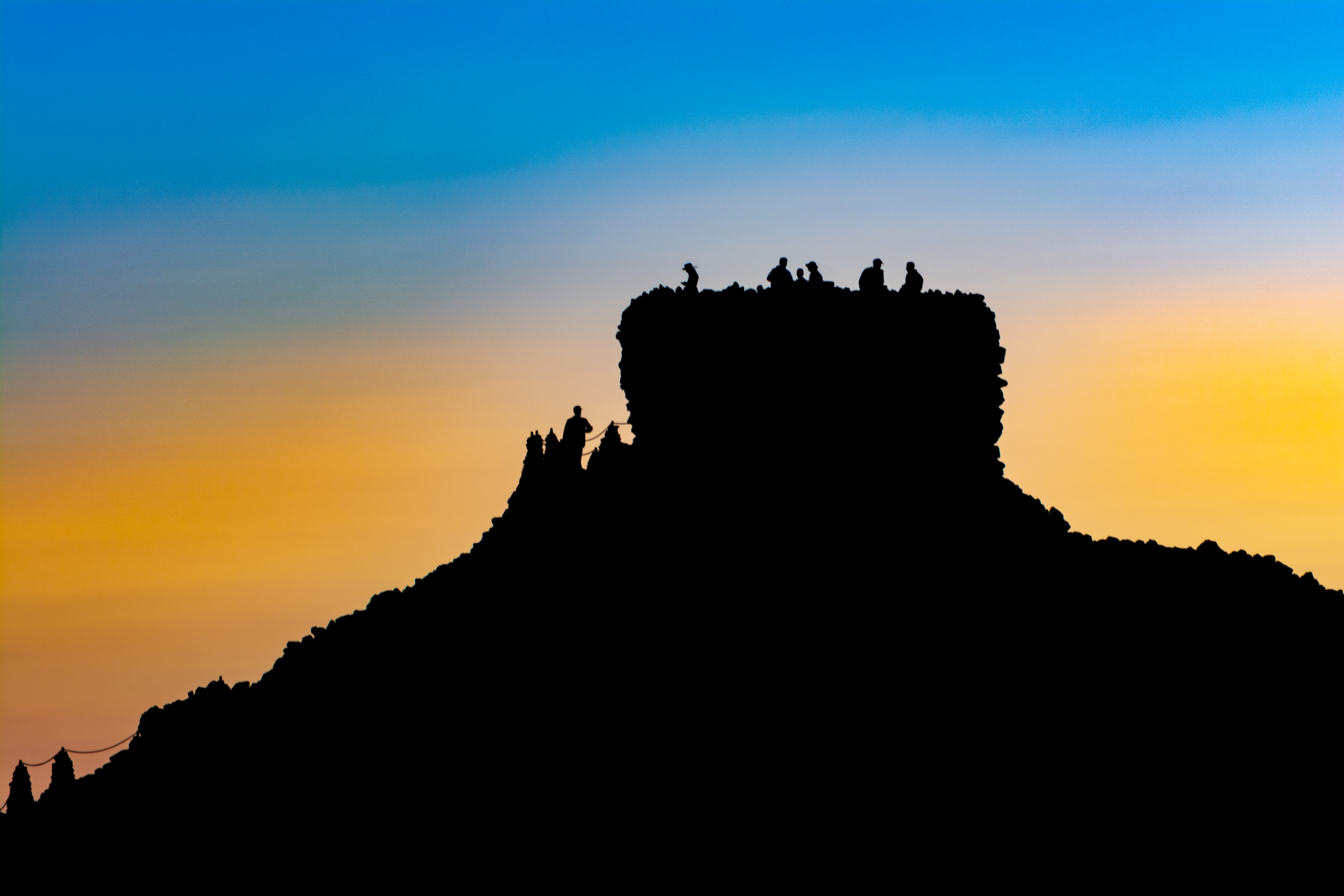
