= Lost Creek (Oregon) =

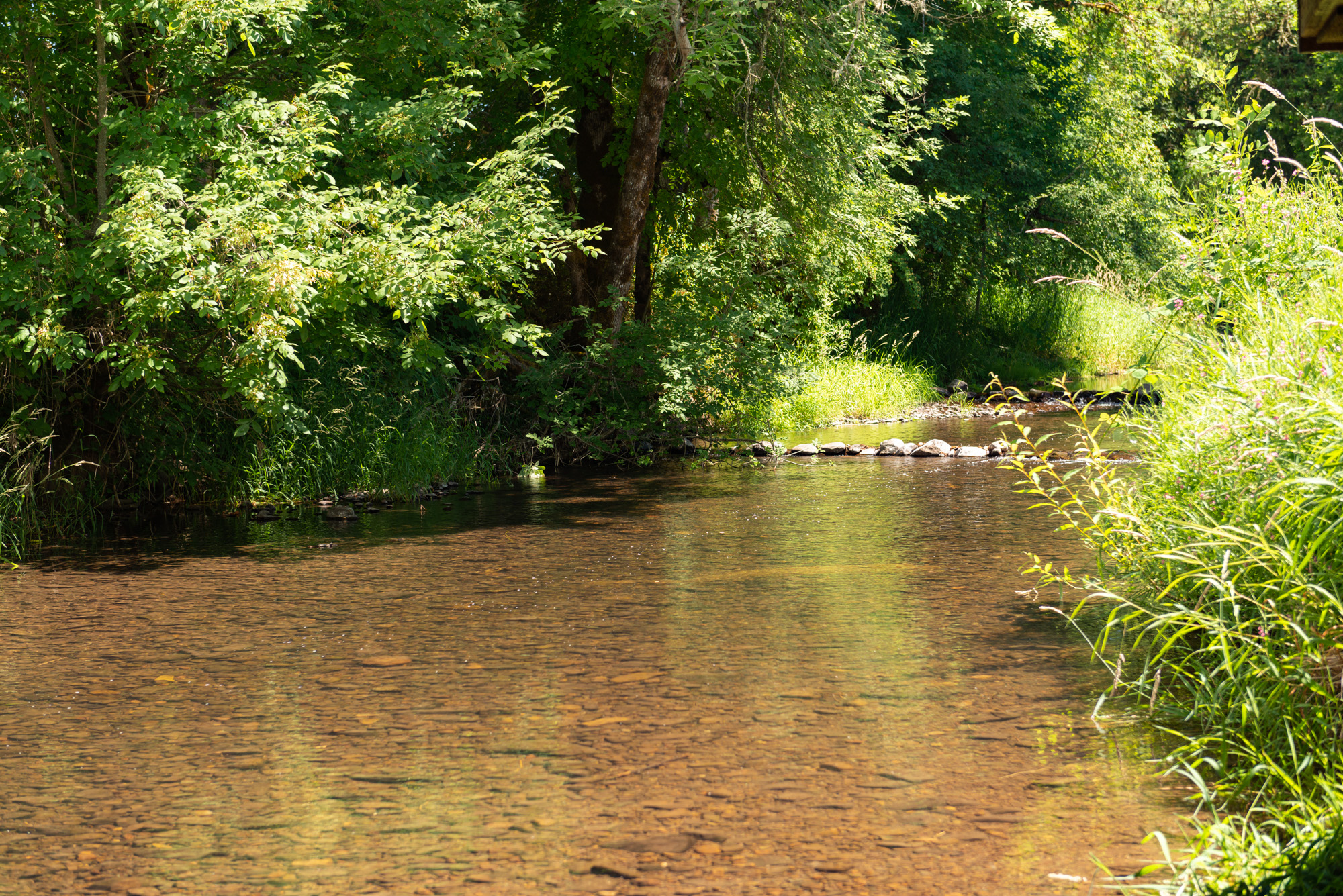
- Lost Creek at Parvin Covered Bridge near Dexter.

- Location of the mouth of Lost Creek in Oregon

Location
- Country: United States
- State: Oregon
- County: Lane

Physical characteristics
- Source: Cascade Range
  - location: A spring near Foley Ridge, Willamette National Forest
  - coordinates: 44°09′39″N 122°01′06″W
- Mouth: McKenzie River
  - location: near Belknap Springs
  - coordinates: 44°11′21″N 122°03′57″W
- Length: 3 mi (4.8 km)

Lost Creek is an unusual 3-mile (5 km) tributary of the McKenzie River in Lane County, in the U.S. state of Oregon. It is the lower section of a hydrogeological system, a losing stream, that begins at the base of Collier Glacier in the Cascade Range. This lower section rises from a spring complex north of Oregon Route 242 (McKenzie Highway) in the Cascade Range and flows generally northwest to meet the river near Belknap Springs. This is near the intersection of Route 242 with Oregon Route 126 and about 74 miles (119 km) upstream of the McKenzie's confluence with the Willamette River.

== Geology ==
Lost Creek was thus named because, if its main tributary, White Branch, is included in the reckoning, it is a disappearing stream for some of its course. White Branch flows on the surface at its headwaters then disappears before re-emerging about 9 miles (14 km) further downstream. After resurfacing, it enters Lost Creek from the left slightly downstream of the source spring.

An article in The Ore Bin, a publication of the Oregon Department of Geology and Mineral Industries, explains that White Branch begins at Collier Glacier and follows a glacial trough filled with porous lava. For much of the year, a long stretch of White Branch is dry on the surface. Some of the water percolating through the lava emerges at the spring complex at the head of Lost Creek. Other water in White Branch enters the main stem as a surface tributary. The total length of the Lost Creek – White Branch system is about 20 miles (32 km), of which Lost Creek forms about 3 miles (5 km).

== Recreation ==
Limberlost Campground, managed by the United States Forest Service, is along Lost Creek about a mile upstream of the mouth. Generally open from early May to late September, the campground has campsites, toilets, picnic tables, and fire rings but no drinking water or firewood.

== See also ==
- List of rivers of Oregon
