= McKenzie Pass–Santiam Pass Scenic Byway =

Scenic highway in Oregon, United States

McKenzie Pass–Santiam Pass Scenic Byway
- McKenzie Pass–Santiam Pass Scenic Byway highlighted in red

Route information
- Maintained by ODOT
- Length: 82.0 mi (132.0 km)
- Existed: February 8, 1989–present
- Component highways: OR 242 from Sisters to Belknap Springs; OR 126 from Belknap Springs to Sisters; US 20 from near Santiam Junction to Sisters

Major junctions
- Tourist loop around Mount Washington
- CCW end: US 20 / OR 126 in Sisters
- OR 126 in Belknap Springs; US 20 near Santiam Junction
- CW end: US 20 / OR 126 in Sisters

Location
- Country: United States
- State: Oregon
- Counties: Deschutes, Lane, Linn, Jefferson

Highway system
- Scenic Byways; National; National Forest; BLM; NPS; Oregon Highways; Interstate; US; State; Named; Scenic

The McKenzie Pass–Santiam Pass Scenic Byway is an 82-mile-long (132 km) National Scenic Byway in the U.S. state of Oregon. The route is a loop designed to provide a tour of the high Cascade Range northwest of Bend, passing over both McKenzie Pass and Santiam Pass.

== Route description ==
The route begins on its eastern end at the town of Sisters in northern Deschutes County. It follows Oregon Route 126 westward over Santiam Pass south of Three Fingered Jack, then south along the valley of the McKenzie River. It then follows Oregon Route 242 eastward over McKenzie Pass, north of the Three Sisters then back to the town of Sisters. The route is considered a summer tour route, since the road over McKenzie Pass is closed in winter due to snowfall.

== History ==
The McKenzie Pass–Santiam Pass Scenic Byway was designated a National Forest Scenic Byway on February 8, 1989. It was later made an Oregon State Scenic Byway on February 19, 1997 before becoming a National Scenic Byway on June 9, 1998.

== Major intersections ==
County	Location	mi	km	Destinations	Notes
Deschutes	Sisters	84.83 0.00	136.52 0.00	US 20 east / OR 126 east – Sisters, Redmond, Bend OR 224 begins	Clockwise end of US 20 and OR 126 overlaps; counter-clockwise end of OR 224 overlap
Lane	Belknap Springs	36.59	58.89	OR 126 east – Blue River, Eugene OR 224 ends	Clockwise end of OR 224 overlap; counter-clockwise end of OR 126 overlap
Linn		56.40	90.77	US 20 west – Sweet Home, Lebanon, Albany	Counter-clockwise end of US 20 overlap
Linn	Santiam Junction	59.61	95.93	OR 22 west – Detroit, Salem	
Deschutes	Sisters	84.83 0.00	136.52 0.00	US 20 east / OR 126 east – Sisters, Redmond, Bend OR 224 begins	Clockwise end of US 20 and OR 126 overlaps; counter-clockwise end of OR 224 overlap
1.000 mi = 1.609 km; 1.000 km = 0.621 mi: Concurrency terminus
