= Yapoah Crater =

Volcanic crater in Central Oregon

Coordinates: 44°12′53″N 121°47′05″W

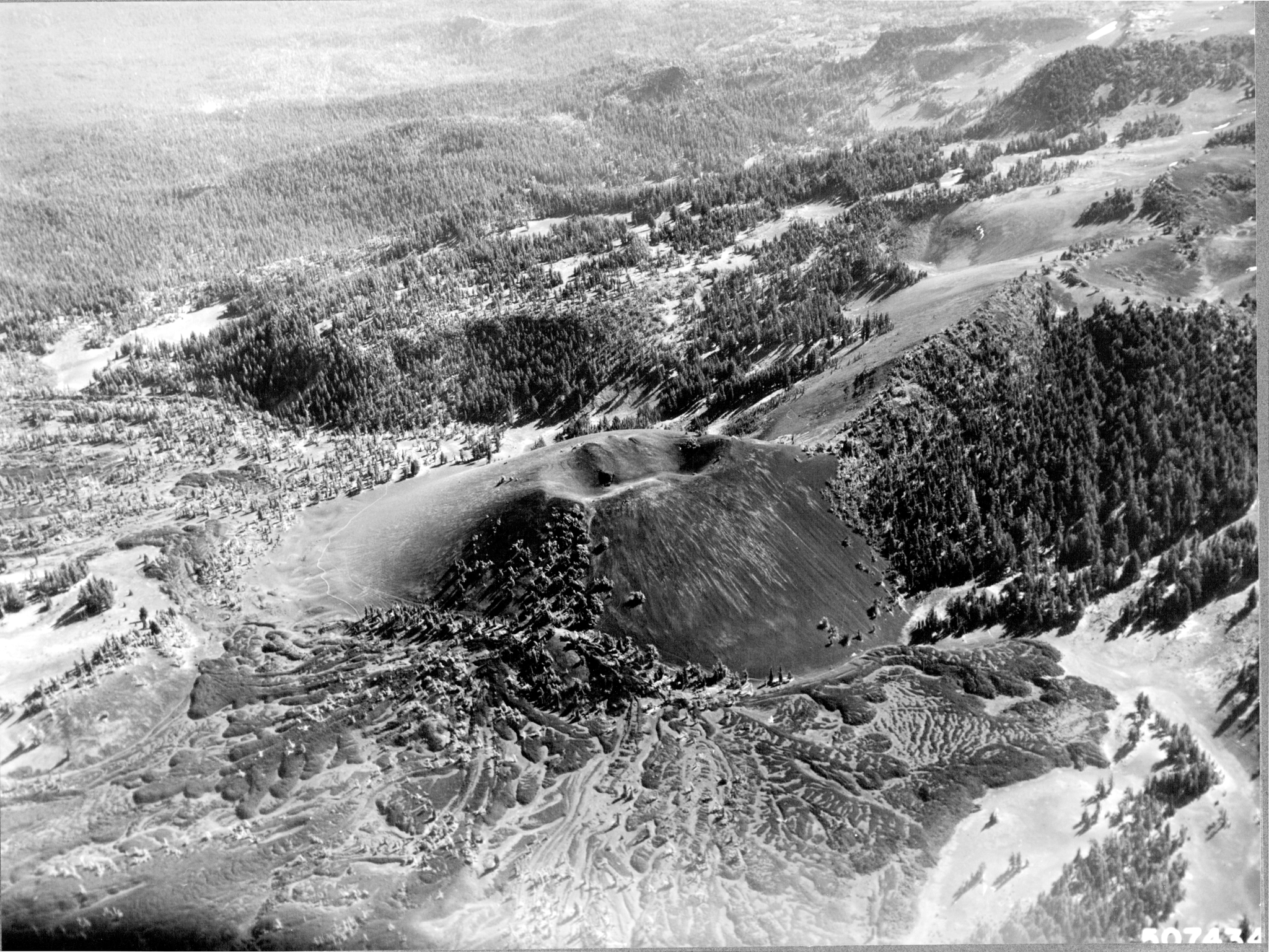
Yapoah Crater viewing Skyline Trail around the base.

Yapoah Crater is a cinder cone in the Cascade Range of Central Oregon, located within the Three Sisters Wilderness. It sits on the boundary between Deschutes National Forest and Willamette National Forest, just north of North Sister.

The crater is prominent for its stark, largely unvegetated basaltic lava fields and its proximity to the Pacific Crest Trail (PCT), which loops around the base of the cone.

== Etymology ==
The name "Yapoah" is derived from a Native American term (likely from the Sahaptin or Klamath languages) meaning "isolated hill" or "isolated eminence", referencing the cone's distinct silhouette rising above the surrounding lava plains.

== Geology ==
Yapoah Crater is one of the younger volcanic vents in the High Cascades, with its last major eruptive period estimated to have occurred roughly 2,600 to 2,000 years ago.

The mountain is composed primarily of red, black, and yellow basaltic scoria and volcanic bombs. Unlike many cinder cones in the region, Yapoah's cone is unbreached; its massive lava flows are believed to have originated from a vent at the base of the structure rather than spilling over the rim, or the cone itself was built over the primary vent during the final explosive phases of the eruption.

A massive plug of black basalt stands directly near the center of the inner crater pit.

=== Lava flows ===
Between 2,600 and 2,900 years ago, Yapoah discharged a massive volume of aa lava that traveled approximately 5 miles (8.0 km) north and east toward McKenzie Pass.

== Recreation ==
The Pacific Crest Trail provides the primary access to Yapoah Crater, tracing around its western and northern base. A well-established user trail splits from the PCT on the northwest side of the cone, allowing hikers to ascend through loose scoria to the crater rim. From the summit at 6,737 feet (2,053 m), hikers are provided panoramic views of the Cascade chain, stretching from Mount Hood in the north to the Three Sisters and Diamond Peak to the south.
