= Tamolitch Falls =

Waterfall in Oregon, United States

Coordinates: 44.311788°N 122.026172°W

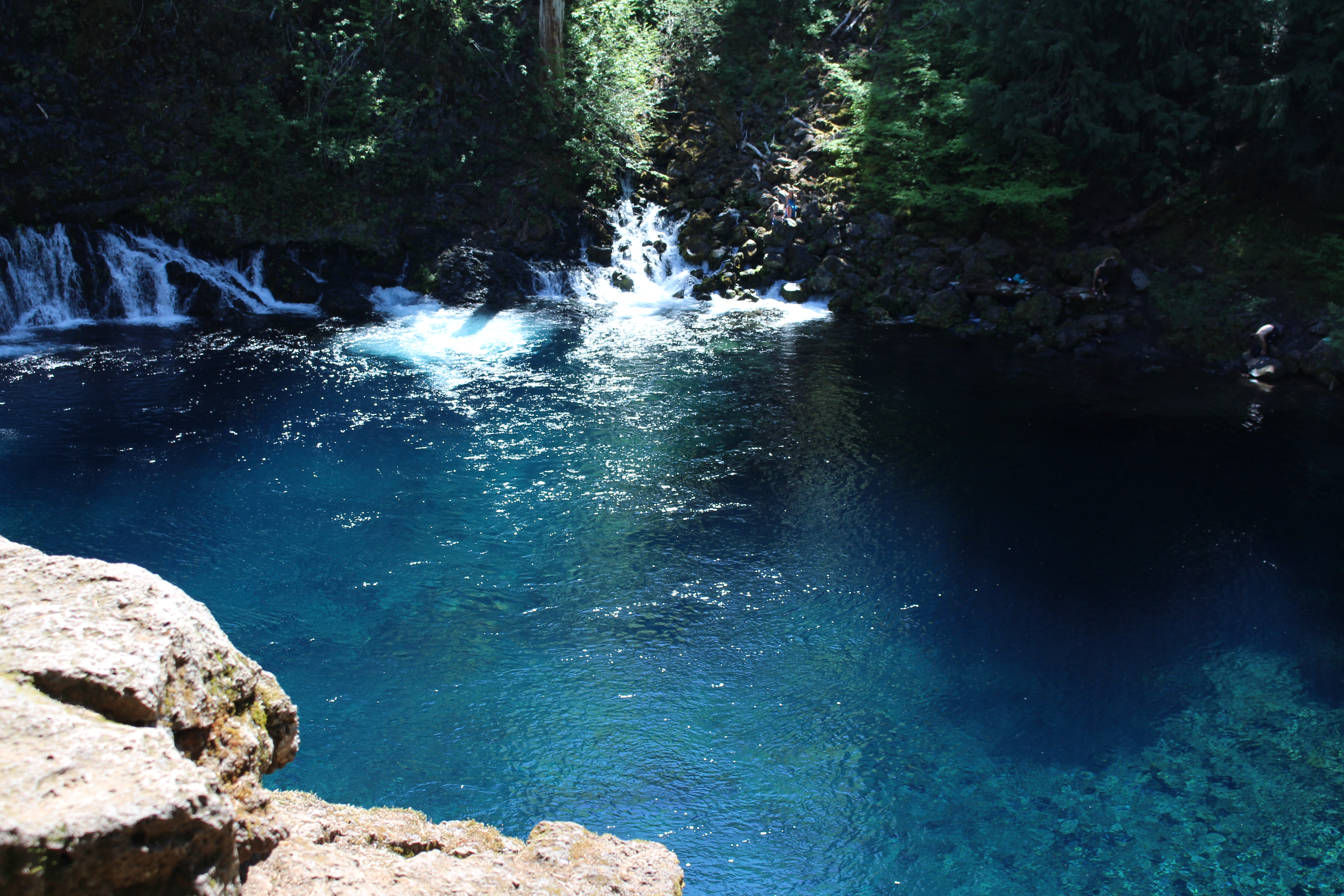
Tamolitch Blue Pool courtesy of Eugene, Cascades & Coast

The Tamolitch Falls, now a seasonal waterfall, once had a constant flow on the McKenzie River in Lane County, Oregon. The site is located in the Willamette National Forest.

== Geography ==
In the 1960s, water was diverted for hydroelectric use from the stream above the falls. That section of the stream and the falls, ceased to flow except during periods of heavy runoff or when water was diverted from the dams upstream. When this is not the case, the stream goes underground and now emerges below the falls. At the base of the former falls is the Tamolitch Blue Pool, a small body of water known for its blue color. Elevation: 2,487 feet (758 meters)

The pool can be reached from part of the McKenzie River Trail. From the trailhead to the pool, it is a 3.6 miles (5.8 km) out and back hike. The trail is heavily trafficked during the spring and summer and parking fills up quickly. The trail welcomes hikers, bikers, runners, and dogs as long as they are on a leash. The beginning of the hike is through an old growth Douglas fir forest.

As the McKenzie River flows below, the trail goes up along a cliff, which descends into a dry river bed. From there it eventually goes through an old lava flow. The trail isn’t too strenuous, but it does have an elevation gain of 285 feet (87 m). The trail passes by multiple steep cliffs which are hazardous.

The area has minimal to no cellphone service. Rescue efforts can be complicated by the remote terrain.

== Temperature ==
The water temperature of the pool is around 38 °F (3 °C) which is too cold for even microorganisms to live in. The pool is 30 feet (9.1 m) deep, though appears to be shallower.

Such low temperature have proven deadly to attemptive swimmers.
