= Volcano Hazards Program =

US Geological Survey program

The Volcano Hazards Program is a program directed by the USGS that monitors the activity of volcanoes and the public awareness of eruptions. Under the mandate of the Robert T. Stafford Disaster Relief and Emergency Assistance Act (Stafford Act), the Volcano Hazards Program monitors active and potentially active volcanoes, assesses their hazards, responds to volcanic crises, and conducts research on how volcanoes work. The Volcano Hazards Program supports the work of the Volcano Disaster Assistance Program through a mobile monitoring and response system.
