= Oregon Route 242 =

East-west state highway in Oregon, US

Oregon Route 242
- Route 242 highlighted in red

Route information
- Maintained by ODOT
- Length: 36.59 mi (58.89 km)
- Existed: 1962–present
- Tourist routes: McKenzie Pass–Santiam Pass Scenic Byway

Major junctions
- West end: OR 126 in Belknap Springs
- East end: US 20 / OR 126 in Sisters

Location
- Country: United States
- State: Oregon
- Counties: Deschutes, Lane

Highway system
- Oregon Highways; Interstate; US; State; Named; Scenic
← OR 241	→ OR 244
- McKenzie Highway Historic District
- U.S. National Register of Historic Places
- U.S. Historic district
- NRHP reference No.: 10001215
- Added to NRHP: February 7, 2011

Oregon Route 242, known as a portion of the McKenzie Highway, is an Oregon state highway that runs from Belknap Springs, Oregon through McKenzie Pass in the Oregon Cascades, to Sisters, Oregon, in the United States. The McKenzie Highway was added to the National Register of Historic Places in February, 2011.

This highway was the original routing of U.S. Route 28 through the Oregon Cascades until 1952, when it was redesignated as part of U.S. Route 126 (now Oregon Route 126). This highway was built in the 1920s and was the only highway over the Cascades going east out of Eugene until 1962, when a gravel road heading north from Belknap Springs to U.S. Route 20 at Santiam Junction was widened and paved. At that point, the new alignment was designated as US 126, and the old alignment was renamed OR 242. OR 242 is now considered primarily a scenic route. As a result, it is not plowed or sanded, and is thus closed during winter—generally from November 1 until about the July 1 every year, although snows have closed it as early as Labor Day in the past. Snow packs of up to fourteen feet are common on the summit of the road; snow gates are located 7 miles (11 km) east of the junction with OR 126 at Belknap Springs, and 8 miles (13 km) west of Sisters.

This is the 2nd highway in Oregon to have the designation OR 242. The earlier OR 242 was located in the Willamette Valley and connected U.S. Route 99E (now Oregon Route 99E) in Woodburn with Oregon Route 219 southeast of St. Paul. This incarnation of OR 242 existed between 1932 and sometime after 1951, when it was replaced with an extended Oregon Route 214. Later, OR 219 was redirected along most of this route to end on Interstate Route 5 in Woodburn, and OR 214 was truncated to the same interchange.

== History ==
=== Current designation ===
What is now OR 242 was a wagon route over the Cascade Range. It was built in 1862. The highway for automobiles was constructed in 1924. In the original plan for the U.S. Numbered Highway plan on November 11, 1926, U.S. Route 28 (US 28) was designated from Florence to Ontario. US 28 followed the alignment of OR 242. The American Association of State Highway Officials approved to change US 28 between Eugene and Prineville to US 126 in 1952. In 1962, the Clear Lake Cutoff was completed. The completion resulted in US 126 being rerouted from McKenzie Pass to the cutoff. The rerouting included a concurrency with US 20. After the rerouting, the OR 242 designation was formed on the McKenzie Pass route. In February 2011, OR 242 was added to the National Register of Historic Places. In September 2011, McKenzie Pass was designated as an Oregon Scenic Bikeway

== Major intersections ==
County	Location	mi	km	Destinations	Notes
Lane	Belknap Springs	0.00	0.00	OR 126 – Blue River, Eugene, Clear Lake, Bend	
Deschutes	Sisters	36.59	58.89	US 20 / OR 126 – Sisters, Redmond, Bend, Eugene, Salem	
1.000 mi = 1.609 km; 1.000 km = 0.621 mi

== Gallery ==
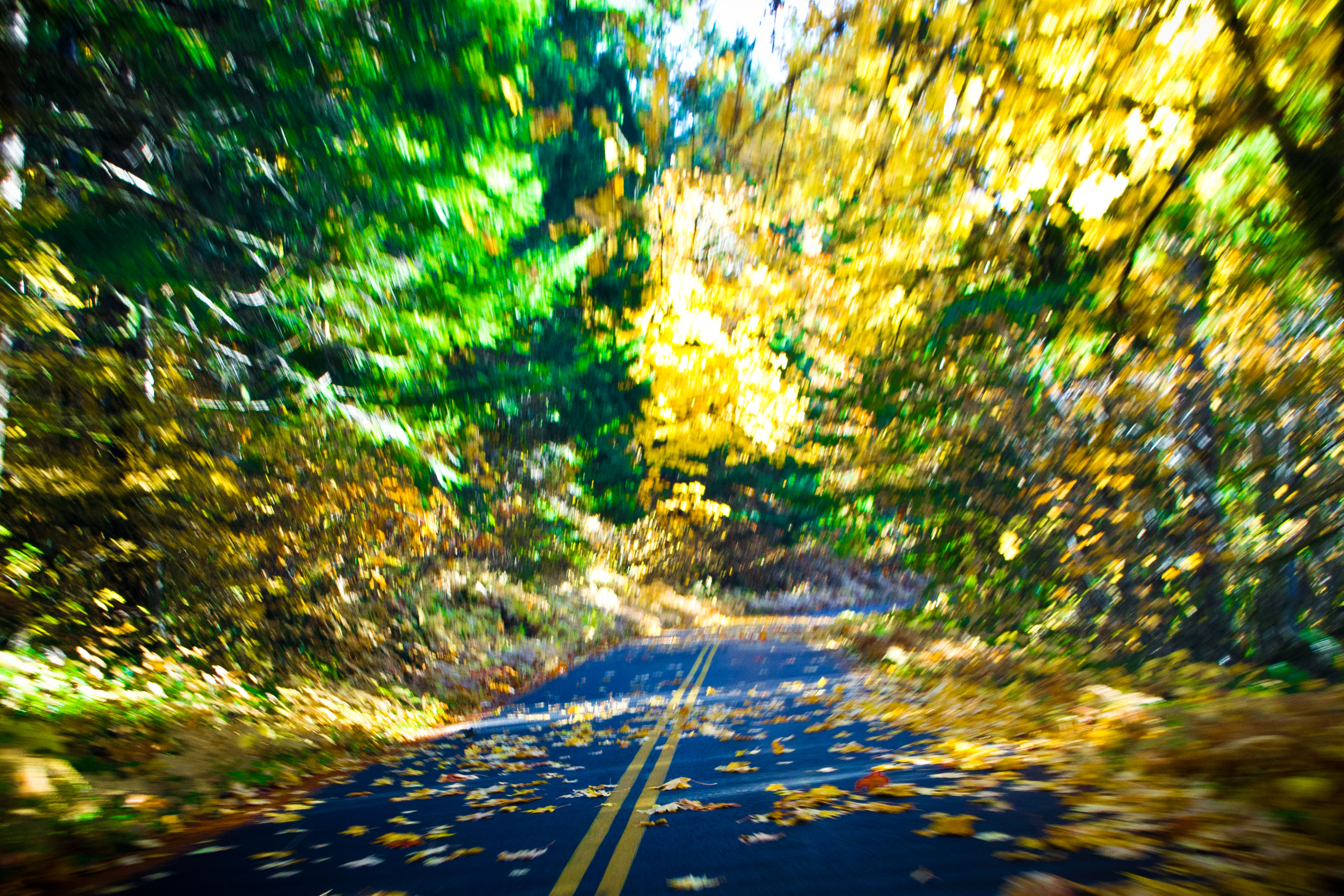
Fall Colors

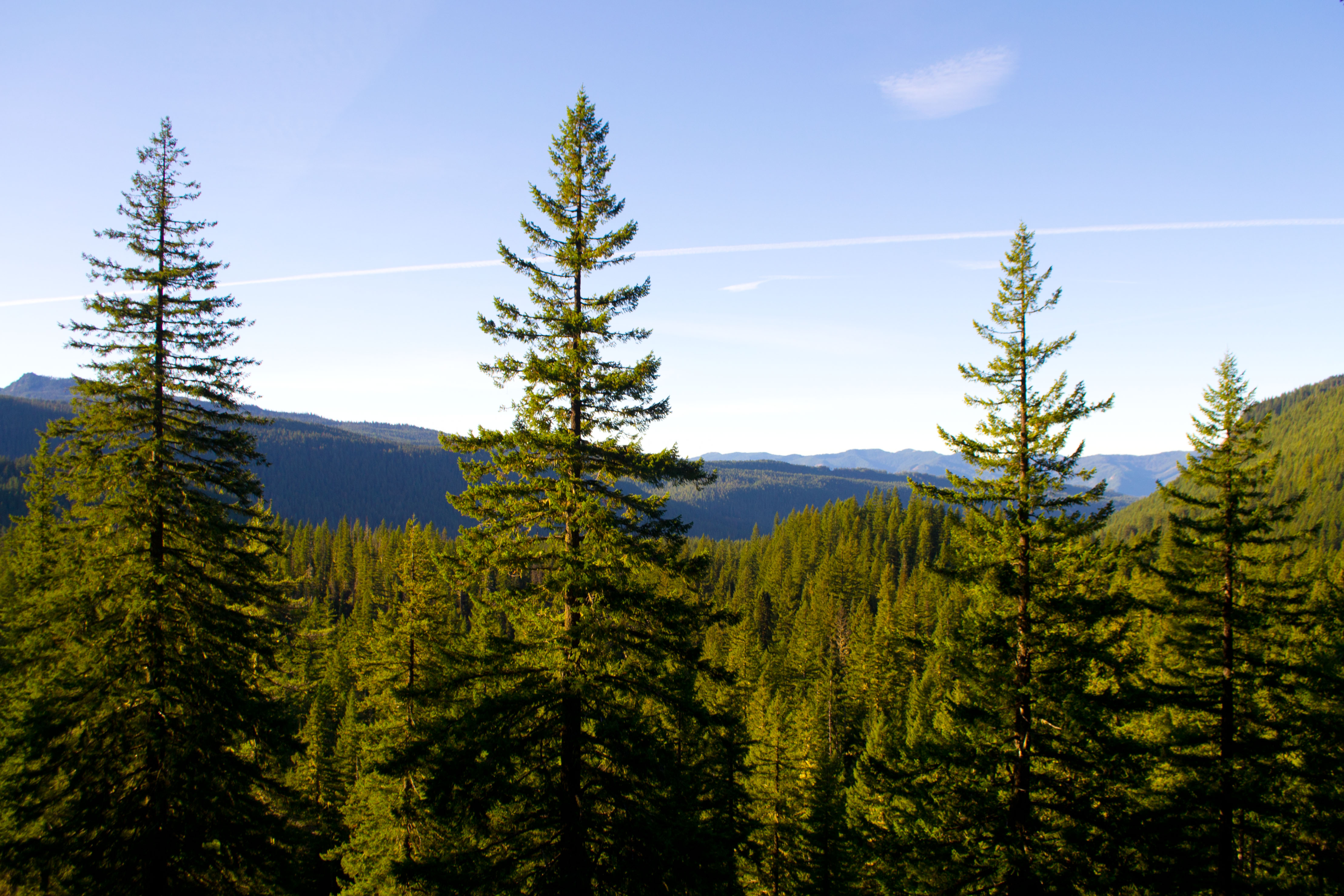
Scenic Vista

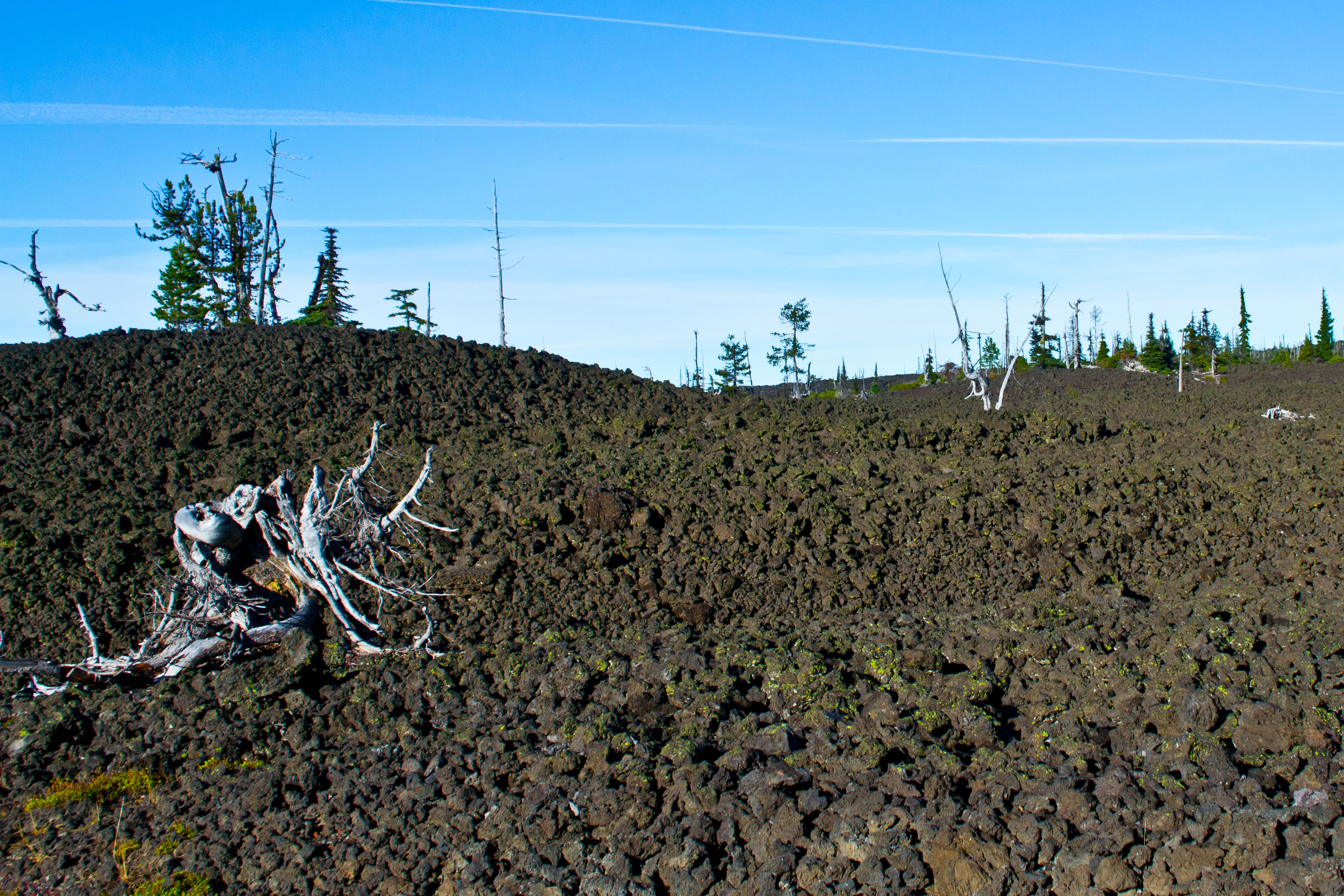
Lava Beds

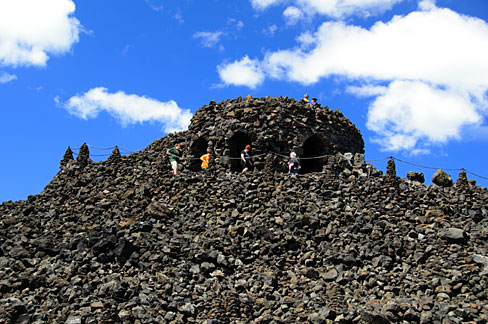
Dee Wright Observatory
