= McKenzie Pass =

Mountain pass in Oregon

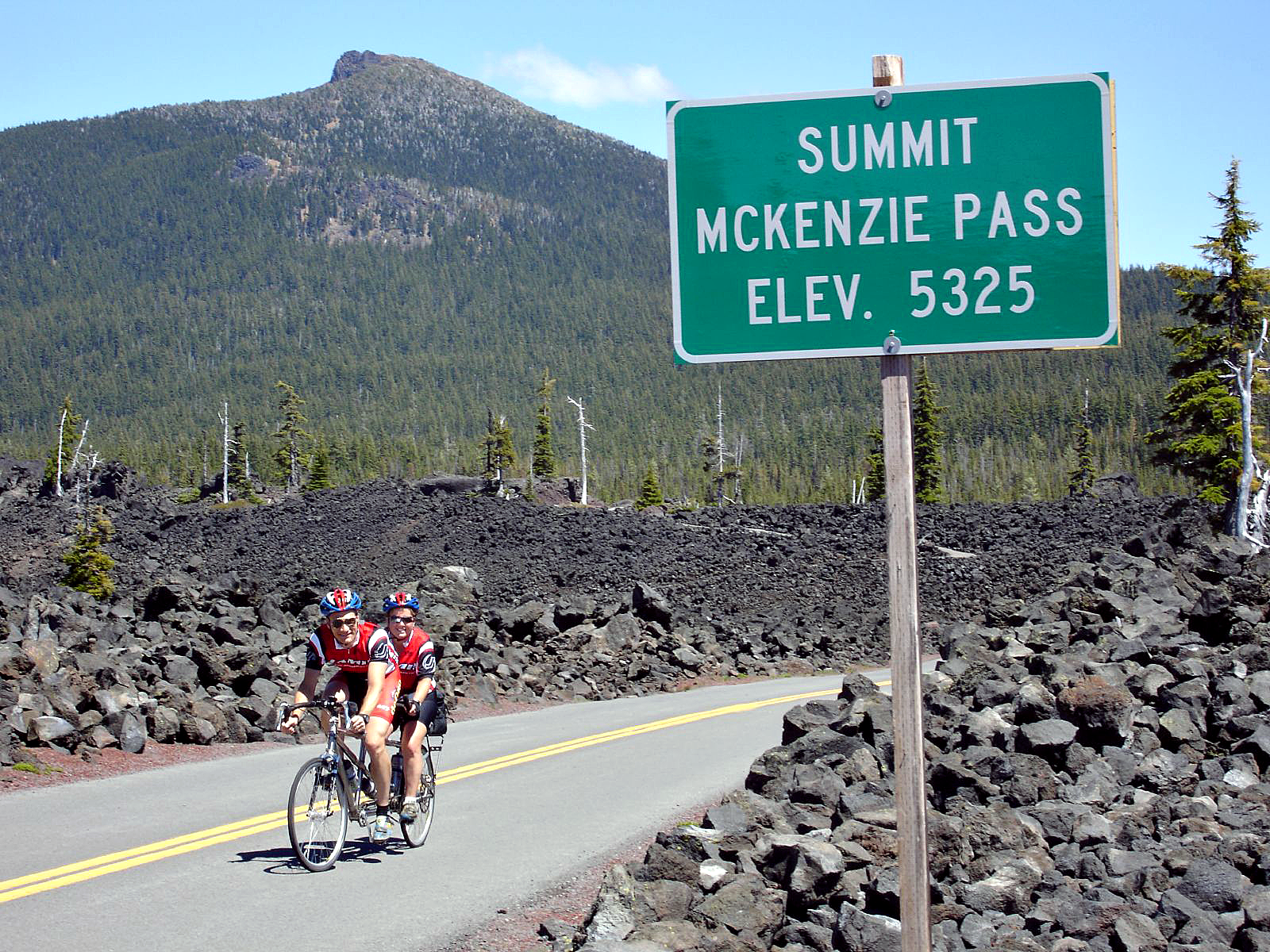

- Location within Oregon
- Elevation: 5,325 ft (1,623 m)
- Traversed by: OR 242

Third Approach
- Location: Deschutes and Linn counties, Oregon, United States
- Range: Cascades
- Coordinates: 44°15′35″N 121°48′35″W

McKenzie Pass, elevation 5,325 feet (1,623 m), is a mountain pass in the Cascade Range in central Oregon in the United States.

It is located at the border of Linn and Deschutes counties, approximately 25 miles (40 km) northwest of Bend, between the Three Sisters to the south and Mount Washington to the north. Oregon Route 242 goes over the pass.

At the summit of the pass, Oregon Route 242 crosses a 65-square-mile (170 km^{2}) lava flow just west of Sisters. Surrounded by lava, the Dee Wright Observatory was constructed in 1935 by Civilian Conservation Corps workers and named after their foreman. Visitors climb to the observatory to view the Cascade peaks visible from McKenzie Pass. Also near the summit is Clear Lake, a renowned location for fresh-water diving.

Highway 242 is not recommended for large trucks, trailers or motor homes due to numerous tight switchbacks. The pass is closed from November to July due to snow.

The pass is named for Donald McKenzie, a Scottish Canadian fur trader who explored parts of the Pacific Northwest for the Pacific Fur Company in the early 19th century.

== Climate ==
Climate data for McKenzie Pass, Oregon(1981–2010)
| Month | Jan | Feb | Mar | Apr | May | Jun | Jul | Aug | Sep | Oct | Nov | Dec | Year |
|---|---|---|---|---|---|---|---|---|---|---|---|---|---|
| Mean daily maximum °F (°C) | 32.9 (0.5) | 35.8 (2.1) | 39.0 (3.9) | 43.1 (6.2) | 51.9 (11.1) | 62.0 (16.7) | 72.1 (22.3) | 71.2 (21.8) | 61.0 (16.1) | 51.0 (10.6) | 37.5 (3.1) | 32.6 (0.3) | 51.0 (10.6) |
| Mean daily minimum °F (°C) | 18.9 (−7.3) | 22.0 (−5.6) | 23.0 (−5.0) | 24.9 (−3.9) | 29.9 (−1.2) | 36.1 (2.3) | 42.1 (5.6) | 42.3 (5.7) | 37.1 (2.8) | 29.9 (−1.2) | 25.3 (−3.7) | 20.8 (−6.2) | 29.4 (−1.4) |
| Average precipitation inches (mm) | 12.2 (310) | 10.8 (270) | 9.0 (230) | 5.8 (150) | 3.6 (91) | 3.6 (91) | 1.1 (28) | 1.8 (46) | 3.8 (97) | 5.8 (150) | 11.7 (300) | 15.2 (390) | 84.4 (2,140) |
| Average snowfall inches (cm) | 69.7 (177) | 75.9 (193) | 75.4 (192) | 47.5 (121) | 13.5 (34) | 1.4 (3.6) | 0.1 (0.25) | 0.0 (0.0) | 1.4 (3.6) | 16.5 (42) | 59.4 (151) | 83.7 (213) | 444.4 (1,129) |

== Astronaut training ==
Parts of central Oregon were used as a training grounds for Apollo astronauts between 1964 and 1966. The astronauts would practice walking on terrain that was similar to the surface of the Moon. On August 25, 1964, Walter Cunningham struggled in a lava flow at McKenzie Pass, where he eventually fell and tore his space suit. Cunningham flew on Apollo 7 in 1968.

== See also ==
- McKenzie Bridge, Oregon
- McKenzie River (Oregon)
