= Belknap =

Belknap may refer to:

== Places ==
=== United States ===
- Belknap, Illinois, a village
- Belknap, Louisville, Kentucky, a neighborhood
- Belknap, Montana, a census-designated place
- Belknap, Rhode Island, a village
- Belknap, Texas, a ghost town
- Belknap County, New Hampshire
  - Belknap Mountains
    - Belknap Mountain
- Belknap Crater, a volcanic feature in Oregon
- Belknap Hill, in Grand Rapids, Michigan
- Belknap Springs, Oregon
- Belknap Township, Pottawattamie County, Iowa
- Belknap Township, Michigan
- Fort Belknap Indian Reservation, Montana
- Mount Belknap (Utah), a mountain in Utah

=== Antarctica ===
- Belknap Nunatak, Ellsworth Land

== American structures on the National Register of Historic Places ==
- Fort Belknap (Texas), built in 1851 to protect the Texas frontier against raids by the Kiowa and Comanche
- Belknap School, Belknap, Rhode Island, a former schoolhouse
- Belknap House, Carson City, Nevada
- Belknap Stone House, Newburgh, New York
- Belknap Bridge, Oregon

== In the military ==
- USS Belknap, more than one United States Navy ship
- Belknap-class cruiser, a class of United States Navy guided missile cruisers built during the 1960s
- Camp Belknap (military camp), a Mexican–American War camp in Texas
- Fort Belknap (Texas), built in 1851 to protect the Texas frontier against raids by the Kiowa and Comanche

== People ==
- Belknap (surname), people with the surname Belknap

== Other uses ==
- Camp Belknap, a summer camp on Lake Winnipesaukee, New Hampshire
- Belknap Hardware and Manufacturing Company, a former leading American manufacturer of hardware goods and major wholesaler
- Belknap Press, an imprint owned by Harvard University Press
- Belknap Campus, the main campus of the University of Louisville

== See also ==
- Gen. William Worth Belknap House, Keokuk, Iowa, on the National Register of Historic Places
- Belnap Family Organization, a non-profit organization primarily involved in genealogy
