= Gilbert Belnap =

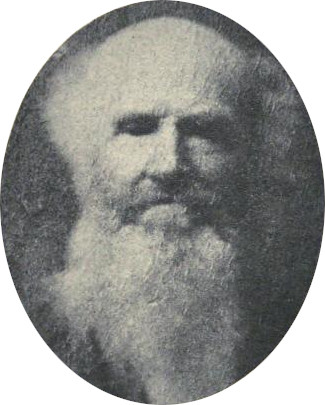

Personal details
- Born: December 22, 1821; Port Hope, Ontario (Upper Canada)
- Died: February 26, 1899 (aged 77); Hooper, Utah
- Occupation: Early leader in the Church of Jesus Christ of Latter-day Saints; Weber County Sheriff.

Gilbert Belnap (December 22, 1821 - February 26, 1899) was a Mormon pioneer, 19th-century local level leader in The Church of Jesus Christ of Latter-day Saints, and an early colonizer of Ogden, Utah, Fort Lemhi, Idaho and Hooper, Utah.

== Biography ==
Born in Port Hope, Ontario, Upper Canada, Belnap, the grandson of American Revolutionary War veteran Jesse Belnap, was orphaned at age 10–12. Attaching himself to an American company of light horse rangers as first sergeant, he was taken as prison-of-war in the Upper Canada Rebellion. Following his release, he eventually made his way to Kirtland, Ohio, where he was baptized a member of the Church of Jesus Christ of Latter Day Saints in 1842. Shortly after his baptism, he served a mission with John P. Greene to Upstate New York.

Soon after arriving in Nauvoo, Illinois in 1844, he was called to serve as a bodyguard to Joseph Smith Jr. One special assignment involved attending a meeting of anti-Mormons who were plotting the assassination of Smith. Belnap was at Carthage Jail on June 27, 1844, the day Smith was killed. He and Porter Rockwell were reportedly the first Latter-day Saints who had not been in Carthage at the time of the martyrdom to hear the tragic news. In Nauvoo he was also ordained to the Sixth Quorum of Seventy.

Belnap married Adaline Knight, daughter of early LDS Church leader Vinson Knight and Martha McBride, founding member of the LDS Relief Society less than two months before the Mormons' expulsion from Nauvoo. Following a stay in Winter Quarters and later Fremont County, Iowa, the family departed for Utah in 1850. Belnap was appointed captain of 10 in the Warren Foote Company, 2nd hundred. Soon after departing, Belnap lost his second son and child, 13-month-old John McBride Belnap, who died of cholera in 1850 and was buried in his father's tool chest near the Saline Ford at the confluence of Salt Creek and the Platte River along the Oxbow Trail. (This event that was commemorated in 1997 during the sesquicentennial celebration of the Mormon Trail.)

Upon arrival in the Salt Lake Valley, Belnap was sent to settle in Fort Buenaventura built by Miles Goodyear in Weber County, Utah. In 1852 he was sealed to his first wife's first cousin, Henrietta McBride, in plural marriage. He eventually had 17 children, 15 of whom survived to adulthood, and 160 grandchildren.

== Church and community service ==
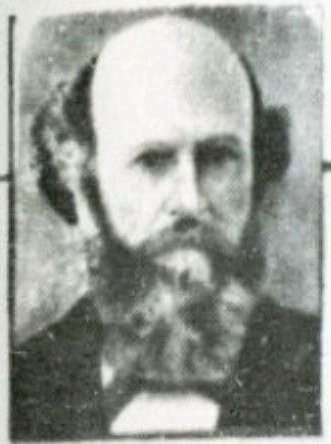
Undated photograph of Gilbert Belnap

In 1855 he was one of the first missionaries called to serve in the Fort Lemhi Mission near present-day Salmon, Idaho, but was recalled in 1858 to serve as a member of the Utah militia during the Utah War. At this time his family participated in the "Move South" to Utah County, Utah.

In early 1868, Belnap moved part of his family to western Weber County to the newly forming community of Hooper, where he was appointed the first "presiding elder" and later as bishop. It is said that Belnap desired to move his family out of Ogden to avoid the corrupting "gentile" influences that were arriving with the coming of the Transcontinental Railroad. In fact, his 40-acre homesite on the east banks of the Weber River in Ogden had been selected as the rail yards of "Junction City." On 8 March 1869, he sat on the reviewing stand with other dignitaries of Weber County for an historic celebration as the tracks and first Union Pacific Railroad engine steamed into Ogden. The old Belnap home was right near where the reviewing platform was built. Three of Gilbert's sons—Gilbert Rosel, Reuben, and Joseph—helped construct the Transcontinental Railroad through Weber Canyon.

He was selected as the first marshal of Ogden City. He also served as Ogden's first prosecuting attorney and first sexton of the Ogden City Cemetery. He later served as Weber County sheriff and held numerous other community positions, including pound keeper, city attorney, county attorney, county assessor and collector, county court selectman, school district trustee, irrigation company trustee, 1872 Utah state constitutional convention delegate, district census taker, and U.S. mail contract awardee.

== Legacy ==
Descendants of Gilbert Belnap now number over 12,200 and are found in most states and several countries outside the U.S. The Belnap Family Organization, a non-profit ancestral family organization, conducts primary genealogical research and preserves genealogical and other historical information on behalf of descendants of Gilbert Belnap and his wives Adaline Knight and Henrietta McBride and others surnamed Belnap or Belknap. It is one of the oldest and largest such family organizations in the United States, having been established in Utah in 1904.

Gilbert Belnap's descendants have distinguished themselves in a wide variety of fields, including medicine, law, finance, business, religion, sports, politics, music, and education. Some notable descendants include Weber County sheriff Gilbert R. Belnap, Utah politician Arias G. Belnap, musician Ryan Shupe, vocal artist Michael Keith Belnap, LDS Church regional representative and Orlando Florida Temple president Bruce E. Belnap, Brigham Young University College of Religious Education dean B. West Belnap, KSL News executive vice president and COO Jeff Simpson, mission president and physician W. Dean Belnap, prize-winning Latin American journalist David F. Belnap, and LDS General Authority Carl B. Cook, among others.

== See also ==
- Belnap Family Organization
