= Belknap (surname) =

Belknap or Belnap is a surname of Norman origin from England that may come from the Anglo-Norman words "belle," meaning beautiful, and "knap," meaning the crest or summit of a small hill. Although today the "k" in Belknap is generally silent as in the words "knight" or "knee," it is evident from documents dating from the Middle English period that it was originally pronounced as a hard "k." The surname is relatively infrequent, and most Belknaps or Belnaps in America are thought to descend from one man, Abraham Belknap (formerly known as Beltoft), who migrated from Sawbridgeworth, Hertfordshire, England to Lynn, Massachusetts, about 1635. The surname continued in England. Today, a wide variety of locations and institutions are named Belknap or Belnap, all of which are believed to be connected in some manner to this early Puritan emigrant to America. Places named Belknap or Belnap include over 130 streets, approximately 20 towns, and 1 U.S. county. Natural features named Belknap range from a nunatak near the South Pole in Antarctica, to a Canadian cape near the North Pole, to a seamount beneath the Pacific Ocean between California and Hawaii, to a tiny rocky island in Indonesia in Southeast Asia.

== Surname origins ==
The earliest documentary reference to someone of this name is to John de Belknap, who first appears in Wiltshire in 1327. He later appears to have moved to London around the time the Black Death arrived in England. John was the father of Sir Robert Belknap, who served as Chief Justice of the Court of Common Pleas of England from 1377 to 1388. The early Belknaps married into a number of notable English families.

The surname Belknap, as carried through descendants of Sir Robert, appears to have died out with Sir Robert's great-grandson, Sir Edward Belknap (c. 1471 – 1521). However, several other males surnamed Belknap, whose connections to Sir Robert are at present unknown, were contemporaries of Sir Robert's family during the 15th and 16th Centuries. The Belknap surname may have continued through one of these other contemporaneous Belknaps through the Beltoft family of Sawbridgeworth, Hertfordshire, who would reside near several of the early manors of the early Belknaps and suddenly assumed or resumed using the surname Belknap in the late 1500s-early 1600s, not long before Abraham Belknap emigrated to Massachusetts in the 1630s.

Variations of the surname Belknap include Belnap, Belknap, Belknappe, etc. Many persons who today spell the surname "Belnap" are known to descend from Jesse Belnap (1760–1854), American Revolutionary War soldier. He was the grandfather of Gilbert Belnap.

== People ==
=== Academics ===
- Jeremy Belknap (1744–1798), American clergyman and historian
- Joanne Belknap, American criminologist
- Nuel Belnap (1930–2024), American logician and philosopher
- Waldron Phoenix Belknap Jr. (1899–1949), American art historian, architect, and soldier

=== Businesspeople ===
- Morris Burke Belknap (the elder) (1780–1877) Early American iron foundry owner and industrialist.
- W. B. Belknap (1811–1889), founding owner of Belknap Hardware and Manufacturing Company.
- William Richardson Belknap (1849–1914) president of the Belknap Hardware and Manufacturing Company.

=== Military personnel ===
- Augustus Belknap (1841–1889) American Union Army officer and railway executive
- Charles Belknap Jr. (1880–1954), Commander of the USS Ammen, and censor for the United States Navy
- George Belknap (1832–1903), United States Navy rear admiral and father of Reginald R. Belknap
- Reginald R. Belknap (1871–1959), United States Navy rear admiral and son of George Belknap
- William G. Belknap (1794–1851), United States Brigadier General

=== Jurists ===
- Charles Henry Belknap (1841–1926), Justice of the Supreme Court of Nevada
- Robert Bealknap (about 1330–1401), also known as Sir Robert Belknap, Chief Justice of the Court of Common Pleas of England

=== Politicians ===
- Arias G. Belnap (1893–1974), Utah politician and LDS Church leader
- Austin Belknap (1819–1902), Massachusetts politician and businessman
- Charles E. Belknap (1846–1929), United States Army Civil War officer and politician from Michigan
- Sir Edward Belknap (c. 1471 – 1521), Privy Councillor for the English kings Henry VII and Henry VIII
- Horace P. Belknap (1856–1936), Oregon physician and state legislator
- Hugh R. Belknap (1860–1901), United States Representative from Illinois
- Morris B. Belknap (1856–1910), American businessman and Republican nominee for Governor of Kentucky
- W. C. Belknap, (1850–1937), American politician
- William Burke Belknap (1885–1965), Kentucky horse and sheep breeder at his Land O'Goshen Farm, economist, politician, academician
- William W. Belknap (1829–1890), Iowa State Representative and United States Secretary of War, impeached after his resignation from office.

=== Others ===
- Abraham Belknap (1589/90–1643), one of the first settlers of New England.
- Anna Belknap (born 1972), American actress
- Daniel Belknap (1771–1815), early American composer
- David F. Belnap (1922–2009), prize-winning American foreign correspondent
- Gilbert Belnap (1821–1899), early LDS Church leader and colonizer
- Matt Belknap, American entertainer
- Zedekiah Belknap, American artist

== See also ==
- Belknap (disambiguation)
- Belnap Family Organization
