= Martha McBride Knight =

American Mormon pioneer

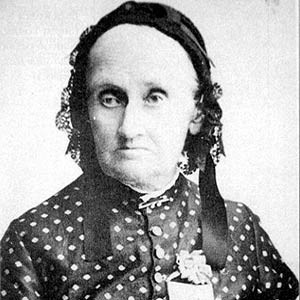
Martha McBride Knight Smith Kimball, late 1800s (Belnap Family Organization)

Martha McBride Knight Smith Kimball (March 17, 1805 – November 20, 1901) was a founding member of the Relief Society of the Church of Jesus Christ of Latter Day Saints, which was organized on her birthday in 1842. She was married to early Latter Day Saint leader Vinson Knight, by whom she had seven children. In 1842 she was sealed as a plural wife to Joseph Smith. In January 1846, she was married polygamously to Heber C. Kimball, by whom she had one child, a son, who was born at Winter Quarters and died there as an infant. She later emigrated to Utah Territory, where she resided in various locations across the territory until her death at age 96. She was a witness to, and in some instances a key participant in, some of the pivotal events in early Latter Day Saint history.

== Early years: New York, Ohio, Missouri ==
Martha McBride was born on March 17, 1805, in Chester, Washington County, New York, (though now in Warren County) the youngest of 9 children born to her parents, Daniel McBride and Abigail Mead. Martha's father, an itinerant pre-Campbellite minister, moved the family to western New York, where he died when Martha was 18 years old. She married Vinson Knight, son of Doctor Rodolphus Knight and Rizpah Lee, on July 26, 1826. They initially resided near Martha's relatives in Perrysburg, Cattaraugus County, where their first 4 children were born. Here Vinson acquired considerable wealth from his farm produce.

Starting in 1833, members of the McBride family began converting to the Latter Day Saint church. Martha and Vinson were baptized into the church soon thereafter, on March 24, 1834, after having been personally taught in their home by Joseph Smith.

In June 1835 Martha and her family moved to Kirtland, Ohio, to gather with other Latter Day Saints. Vinson was called as a counselor in the Kirtland bishopric. Vinson and Martha received their patriarchal blessings on June 24, 1835, at the hands of Joseph Smith Sr. Martha gave birth to one son in Kirtland, Nathaniel Knight, in 1835 (for whom the name was selected by Joseph Smith Sr.); he died on October 31, 1836. On January 2, 1837, Vinson and Martha signed the new Articles of Agreement of the Kirtland Safety Society.

In September 1837, Vinson left for Missouri with Joseph Smith Jr., being gone for two months. Deep apostasy and persecution took hold in Kirtland during that period. Martha and her family moved with other faithful Latter Day Saints in the spring of 1838 to Missouri, arriving at the end of May 1838 at Far West, Caldwell County, Missouri. They settled in Adam-ondi-Ahman in Daviess County, Missouri, where Knight was appointed bishop on June 28, 1838. Very quickly persecution again descended upon the Knight family and others. Within a very brief period, Knight and his family, suffering greatly, were driven from their home by a mob. Knight later executed an affidavit in October 1839 itemizing a bill of damages against the state of Missouri for $10,000 in compensation for property lost and expenses incurred during the expulsion—one of the largest claims made by a Latter-day Saint family for damages suffered in Missouri.

Forced to flee Missouri following Governor Bogg's Extermination Order, the Knight family found refuge with some friends in Pike County, Missouri, near the Mississippi River, where Martha gave birth to Martha Abigail Knight on February 9, 1839.

== Life in Nauvoo ==
In April 1839 Vinson traveled to Iowa to purchase land on which the suffering Saints could settle. He and his moved to Commerce (later Nauvoo), Hancock County, Illinois. Here, on land that Vinson helped select, he constructed a sturdy two-storey red brick home on Main Street, said to be the first brick house in Nauvoo, on the same block as the homes of Brigham Young and John Taylor (this home is still standing).

In Nauvoo, Vinson was actively involved in community and religious affairs. Soon after arriving in Nauvoo, he was designated aide-de-camp to Joseph Smith in the Nauvoo Legion. In January 1841 he was called as bishop of the Lower Ward in Nauvoo. He also served as a member of the first Nauvoo city council and as Regent of the University of the City of Nauvoo. During the April 1841 general conference, Elder Ezra T. Benson stayed with the Knight family.

Martha was equally involved in the key events of Nauvoo. She was a founding member of the Relief Society, being present at the organization meeting on March 17, 1842, in Nauvoo, which also happened to be her 37th birthday. Martha was purportedly told by Joseph Smith that she was the first woman to give her consent for her husband to enter into plural marriage. The story is told that Martha knew something was worrying her husband and he could not seem to tell her about it. One evening as Martha was sitting in the grape arbor behind the house, Vinson returned home carrying a basket. He explained to Martha that he had taken some fruit and vegetables to Philindia Clark Eldredge Merrick (Myrick), widow of Levi N. Merrick, whose husband had been killed in the Hawn's Mill Massacre. Vinson explained to Martha that he had been told to enter plural marriage and that, if he had to, this Sister Merrick would be the one he could help best. Martha's reply is said to have been, "Is that all?" Philindia Merrick was also a founding member of the Relief Society.

Just when he was increasingly involved in the affairs of Nauvoo, Vinson suddenly took ill and died on July 31, 1842, in Nauvoo at age 38. Joseph Smith preached at the funeral, stating that Knight was the "best friend he ever had on earth." One month later, on September 3, 1842, Martha lost her and Vinson's youngest child, Rodolphus Elderkin Knight, who was less than one year old. Shortly before or after Knight's sudden death, Martha was sealed to Joseph Smith. After Smith's death, she was sealed to Heber C. Kimball.

== Life in Utah ==
Two months after her marriage to Heber C. Kimball on 26 March 1846, Martha left Nauvoo as part of the exodus of the majority of Latter Day Saints for the West. She arrived at Mount Pisgah in Iowa on 7 June or July 1846 and at the Big Springs west of the Missouri River on 30 June or July 1846. She took up residence with her married daughters Adaline Knight Belnap and Rizpah Knight Gibbons; their wagons in Winter Quarters were formed in 2 large hollow squares. In the spring of 1847 Martha's son-in-law Andrew Smith Gibbons left with the first company of Saints to enter the Salt Lake Valley. Martha's mother Abigail Mead McBride left for Utah a short while later on 17 June 1847 in company with Martha's brothers Samuel and John McBride.

Martha departed for Utah on June 15, 1850, in the Warren Foote Company, 2nd hundred, in company with her daughter Adaline Knight Belnap, Adaline's husband Gilbert Belnap, and their 2 young sons. Gilbert Belnap served as captain of their ten. Also in the emigrant company was Martha's son James Vinson Knight. They arrived in the Salt Lake Valley on September 17, 1850. Two weeks later, she went to Ogden, Utah, with her daughter Adaline's family, who were sent by Brigham Young to settle there. Their first home was a dugout in the side of a hill on Canfield Creek in Sullivan Hollow at about 30th Street and Madison Avenue.

Shortly after arriving in Ogden, Gilbert Belnap was coming home with his mother-in-law Martha on his wagon. As they were coming down the steep hill along what is now Madison Avenue, the oxen could not hold the wagon and began to run (another version states the wagon hit a stump). Martha was thrown beneath the wagon, which ran over her. Martha's lifeless body, found lying face down in the dust, was carried by Gilbert back to their dugout home and the neighbors gathered around to help revive her. Martha said after she recovered that she saw her body as it lie in the dust and at the house, as if she was standing to one side with the rest of the people looking on.

On January 3, 1856, Martha became 1st counselor to Patience Delila Pierce Palmer in the first Relief Society of the Church of Jesus Christ of Latter-day Saints (LDS Church) organized in Weber County, which functioned until the "Move South" in 1858. Martha and her daughter Adaline were members of a Relief Society committee that dressed the frozen and bleeding feet of the members of a handcart company brought to Ogden by a scouting party. This committee cared for their wants and provided homes for them until their recovery.

Although Martha was one of Heber C. Kimball's polygamous wives, she does not appear to have lived with him very long, if at all, after her arrival in Utah, although he came to see her occasionally in Ogden until his death in 1868.

Martha did not reside long in one place until she was quite old. She felt alone and without a home until she went to live with her daughter Adaline in her later years. In the spring of 1858, Martha left Ogden as a participant in the "Move South." She and Adaline's family went to Springville in Utah Valley on account of the approach of Johnston's Army. She did not return with her daughter Adaline's family to Ogden, but remained in Springville for a season, where she was still living in July 1859. At the end of February 1860, Martha, who had gone to Fillmore, Millard, Utah to be with McBride relatives, left Fillmore for Santa Clara, Washington, Utah, where she was living on 10 March 1860. Here she lived with her daughter Rizpah's family at least through the fall of 1861. In April 1863 Martha was back in Springville and in May 1864 she was back in Santa Clara. Later that fall she returned to Springville. Martha was living in Fillmore on 8 July 1869 when she signed an affidavit before Edward Partridge stating that she had been married to Joseph Smith in the summer of 1842.

Following her daughter Adaline's move to Hooper in 1869, Martha spent most of her remaining years in Hooper, although she continued to move around the Territory of Utah on occasion for approximately another decade. On February 16, 1872, Martha received a second Patriarchal Blessing in Hooper at the hands of John Smith. In January 1875 she was still living there with her daughter Adaline.

In April 1877 Martha attended the dedication of the St. George Temple, where she performed ordinance work for many of her deceased ancestors. She appears to have remained in St. George and nearby Santa Clara for at least one year. In November 1878 she was with her son James in Circleville, Piute, Utah. About 1880 Martha's daughter Almira who had apostatized from the LDS Church came to Ogden with her second husband George Hanscom for a brief visit. Martha was in Hooper at the time.

In 1882 Martha came back to Ogden and kept house for Gilbert Belnap's girls while they went to high school. In 1883 Martha moved to Hooper to stay with the wife of her grandson Joseph Belnap while he was away on an LDS mission. She appears to have remained in Hooper continually hereafter, living in a room of her own in her daughter's house.

== Later years ==
In 1891 Martha's brother Reuben McBride died, leaving Martha the last living member of her childhood family. Ten years later, on November 20, 1901, Martha died in Hooper at the home of her daughter Adaline. She was 96 years old. Adaline was in the same room at the time of Martha's death but had dozed off while sitting on the foot of her mother's bed, thus fulfilling a prophecy made by Heber C. Kimball to Adaline that she would not actually see her mother die. Following one of the largest and most impressive funerals ever held in Hooper, a funeral cortege nearly half a mile long traveled to Ogden, where Martha was buried on November 24, 1901, in the Ogden City Cemetery in the Gilbert Belnap family plot.

An obituary account of Martha's life noted:

The physical strength and endurance of Mrs. Knight was well-nigh marvelous. For nearly twenty years she had not used spectacles. Her needlework was a model for fineness amongst all her acquaintances for the past fifty years. She was a great reader, particularly of the daily papers, reading every word of telegraphic news, and during the Spanish–American War she was regarded as one of the best posted persons in Weber county on the military operations of the contending forces. ... Two or three years ago at a birthday reunion of the family held in her honor, Mrs. Knight was called on for a speech, and prefaced one of considerable length with a recital of the tremendous changes which had taken place in her lifetime, mentioning the steam engine, the modern printing press and the telegraph. To illustrate this latter she described with what slowness news traveled when she was a young woman of 40, and wound up her recital of how on that very day the entire country was able to watch every detail of a little affair at Carson City when Corbett was knocked out by Fitzsimmons.

Martha's handmade handkerchief linen temple robe, used in the Nauvoo Temple, and a colorful handmade quilt top are preserved by her descendants. She took first prize making buttonholes at the New York State Fair when she was 10 years old. She was extremely neat and clean. A granddaughter remembered that her shoes had to fit like kid gloves before she would wear them. She was a dainty little woman, with fine delicate features, gray-blue eyes, and dark (some say light brown) hair.

In 1941 a granddaughter of Martha's swore in an affidavit that, while Martha was alive, her parents, Gilbert and Adaline Belnap, received from the LDS Church $20.00 per month for an extensive period to purchase clothes and food for Martha, and that the LDS Church, upon Martha's death, sent a casket and burial clothes for Martha to Hooper to Bishop Childs, Bishop of the Hooper Ward.

== Family ==
Martha McBride Knight gave birth to 8 children, seven through her husband Vinson Knight and one through Heber C. Kimball. The last four of her children, including the son through Kimball, died young.

- Almira Knight, born June 21, 1827, died 1912 in Akron, Ohio; married (1) Sylvester B. Stoddard and (2) George Hanscom
- Rizpah Knight, born May 13, 1829, died 1895 in St. Johns, Arizona; married Andrew Smith Gibbons
- Adaline Knight, born May 4, 1831, died 1919 in Salt Lake City, Utah; married Gilbert Belnap
- James Vinson Knight, born September 4, 1833, died 1912 in Salt Lake City, Utah; married Celestial Roberts
- Nathaniel Knight, born October 30, 1835, died 1836
- Martha Abigail Knight, born February 9, 1839, died March 24, 1844, in Nauvoo, Illinois
- Rodolphus Elderkin Knight, born September 29, 1841, died 1842 in Nauvoo, Illinois
- (son) Kimball, born about January 13, 1847, died as an infant

Martha's posterity today numbers in the tens of thousands, most of whom are still members of the LDS Church. Notable descendants include LDS General Authorities Francis M. Gibbons and Larry W. Gibbons.

== See also ==
- Belnap Family Organization
