= William M. Wall =

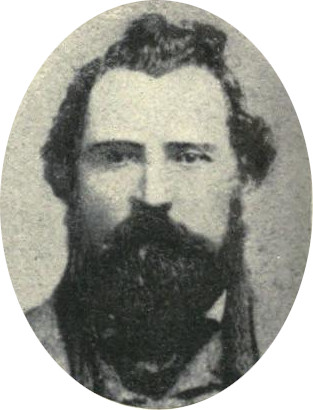

Personal details
- Born: William Madison Wall; September 30, 1821; Rockingham, North Carolina, United States
- Died: September 18, 1869 (aged 47); Provo, Utah, Utah Territory
- Resting place: Provo City Cemetery, Provo, Utah, United States
- Children: 31
- Parents: Isaac Wall and Nancy Duncan

William Madison Wall (September 30, 1821 – September 18, 1869) was a Mormon pioneer, explorer, military officer, and church leader in Provo, Heber, and Wallsburg, Utah, and a settler of Utah Territory.

== Early years ==
Wall was born September 30, 1821, in North Carolina to Isaac Wall and Nancy Duncan. Wall's mother was said to have died when he was 7, giving birth to his brother, Richard. His father, Isaac, then put all 4 of his children into his relative's care around the county. William was put into the care of his Uncle, who basically used him as a slave. He was treated so badly, that he ran away and was found later in Wayne County, Illinois. He was taken into the Haws family house and was treated like an actual son.

== Life in Nauvoo and Pioneer ==
In 1842, Wall and his family were introduced to missionaries from the Church of Jesus Christ of Latter Day Saints and were baptized. Wall helped establish the early Mormon settlement of Ramus near Nauvoo, Illinois. He was known for being a large man, called alternatively by Joseph Smith "the most expert wrestler in Ramus" and "the bully of Ramus." (History of the Church, 5:16 p. 302).

Wall was a lieutenant in the Nauvoo Legion and worked close with Brigham Young, John Taylor, and Willard Richards. He was imprisoned on trumped up charges but escaped, he later went back to turn himself in but was allowed to go free.

In 1850, Wall crossed the plains to Utah with the Warren Foote Company. He was a Captain of 50 and Captain of the Second Division. Within three days, a child died of Cholera and Wall himself had gotten sick with it a few days later. The treatment for Cholera was to keep liquids away from the patient to dry up the diarrhea but Wall rolled out of the wagon and ended up drinking deeply from a water pail. Wall recovered days later.

== Settling Down ==
When Wall and his company arrived in Utah, Wall headed down to Provo where he had his sixth child. Wall was called to be an early Bishop in Provo, where he also served as a local military captain. He would later on become the City Marshall of Provo. He was a known polygamist and had several wives in his lifetime.

== Conflicts ==
In 1853, the Walker War was sparked. Brigham Young ordered Wall to go south and warn any settlements there, as well as to arrest any Mexican Traders that hadn't left when ordered to. They marched as far south as Harmony checking on settlers, meeting with Indian Chiefs, and arresting a few Mexican traders. This expedition cost around $2,251.50. The Walker War ended without further involvement of Wall. He was ordered to Fillmore, Utah, in 1853 for a year before returning to Provo.

Wall then was called on a mission from Utah to Australia. However, after around a year, he was ordered back to Utah because of a looming war with the United States. He sailed back with all the people he converted. This trip took around 118 days. When he landed in California, he was taken by a mob and was going to get hanged, but was let go due to the fact that he had just arrived.

Wall was a licensed attorney in Utah, a prosecuting attorney, and the second sheriff of Utah County, Utah. In 1863, he was elected to the first of two terms representing Wasatch County in the Utah territorial legislature.

== Later years ==
On January 19, 1855, the Provo Canyon Road Co. was incorporated to build a road up Provo Canyon to Heber Valley, but construction was delayed because of the looming threat of war. Wall was put in charge of overseeing construction of the road. He also established a ranch in the south end of Heber Valley. The last two years of Wall's life were dedicated to improving the Road and developing his ranch. One day he was ambushed by a Native American and was shot in the chest, however, the bullet hit his watch and deflected upward. He was struck twice by a bullet during his lifetime but no harm was done to him, as promised in his patriarchal blessing. His health deteriorated quickly but he continued to labor on the road. He became ill and died on the road at the age of 47.

He was buried in the Provo City Cemetery. One of the towns he helped established was eventually named Wallsburg in his honor.
