= Frank Gibbons =

Frank Gibbons may refer to:

- Francis M. Gibbons (1921–2016), secretary to the First Presidency of the Church of Jesus Christ of Latter-day Saints
- Frank George Gibbons (1899–1932), British First World War flying ace
