= Arias G. Belnap =

- Arias Guy Belnap (age 20 as missionary in Germany)
- Born: September 6, 1893; Hooper, Utah
- Died: February 26, 1974 (aged 80); Ogden, Utah
- Occupations: Utah politician and leader in the Church of Jesus Christ of Latter-day Saints

Arias Guy Belnap (September 6, 1893 – February 26, 1974) was a Utah politician and businessman.

== Biography ==
Belnap, second son and child of Hyrum Belnap and second (plural) wife Anna Constantia Bluth, an LDS Church convert from Stockholm, Sweden, was born in the home of his grandfather, Gilbert Belnap, in Hooper, Utah.

He was a gifted basketball player whose 1913 season foul shooting record for Weber Academy stood unbroken until the time of his death. In the Fall of 1913, he was called as a missionary for the Church of Jesus Christ of Latter-day Saints to serve in the Swiss-German Mission. Initially assigned to serve in Barmen, on account of anti-Mormon persecution he was banished from the Land of Prussia to Baden. He was serving in Mannheim, Germany when World War I broke out. He eventually made his way to England, where he was reassigned to the Southern States Mission. He taught at an LDS Church primary school in Buchanan, Georgia, until his honorable release in 1916.

On September 20, 1916, he married Mabel Harris, daughter of Utah judge Nathan J. Harris and Emma Elvira Oakason. They eventually had 5 children, 3 sons and 2 daughters.

He took employment with his father's business, Belnap Lumber Company, but soon thereafter moved to San Francisco to work at the Twelfth Naval District Base as a civil servant. While residing in San Francisco, he and his young family nearly perished during the 1918 Spanish Flu pandemic. Following the end of World War I, he moved with his family back to Ogden, Utah.

== Political career ==
Belnap's career in politics began not long after the Belnap Lumber Company, of which he and his brother Volney were owners, burned down in a devastating fire on July 21, 1931, while he was vacationing with family in Alberta, Canada. After struggling to keep the business alive, he decided to run for political office as a jest that he couldn't support the current candidate. Coming from a long-time Utah Democratic Party family, he was elected on the Democratic Party ticket in November 1934 as Weber County Treasurer, an elected position he held consistently from January 1935 until March 1957, when he resigned to accept the invitation of Utah Governor George D. Clyde to become a member of the Utah State Tax Commission as commissioner of the Motor Vehicle Department. As county treasurer he was instrumental in the adoption of a unit accounting system that was deemed one of the best then known, and for which he was presented the "Mark Tuttle Award" for outstanding public service.

As commissioner, he was instrumental in the passage of legislation that paved the way for reciprocity trucking agreements with neighboring states. Through his work on behalf of the Utah State Public Employees Association, he was also instrumental in the establishment of the Utah Public Employees Retirement System.

He served on the Utah State Association of County Officials and the Utah State Retirement Board. He was also a national officer with the County Officials Association.

== Church service ==
In March 1927 Belnap was called as the first bishop of the Ogden Twentieth Ward of the Church of Jesus Christ of Latter-day Saints, a position he held through the Great Depression and the first half of World War II for nearly 17 years. He presided over more than 1,000 members and during the War corresponded with some 160 young men from his ward who were called into U.S. military service. One of his greatest accomplishments was the construction of the Twentieth Ward meetinghouse on 21st Street in Ogden during the depths of the Depression. Another proud accomplishment was the creation of the Ogden Twentieth Ward "Liederkranz Chorus," a mixed youth singing group that won regional notoriety for its performing excellence.

In 1943 he was called to serve in the stake presidency of the Ogden Stake, a position he held nearly fourteen years until 1957 when he and his wife moved to Salt Lake City. He was also active in numerous other endeavors, including serving as an officer in the Belnap Family Organization.

== Death ==
Belnap returned with his wife to Ogden in 1971. She died in 1972. He died of a stroke in 1974 at the age of 80.
