= Belknap Bridge =

Covered bridge in Oregon, US

- U.S. National Register of Historic Places
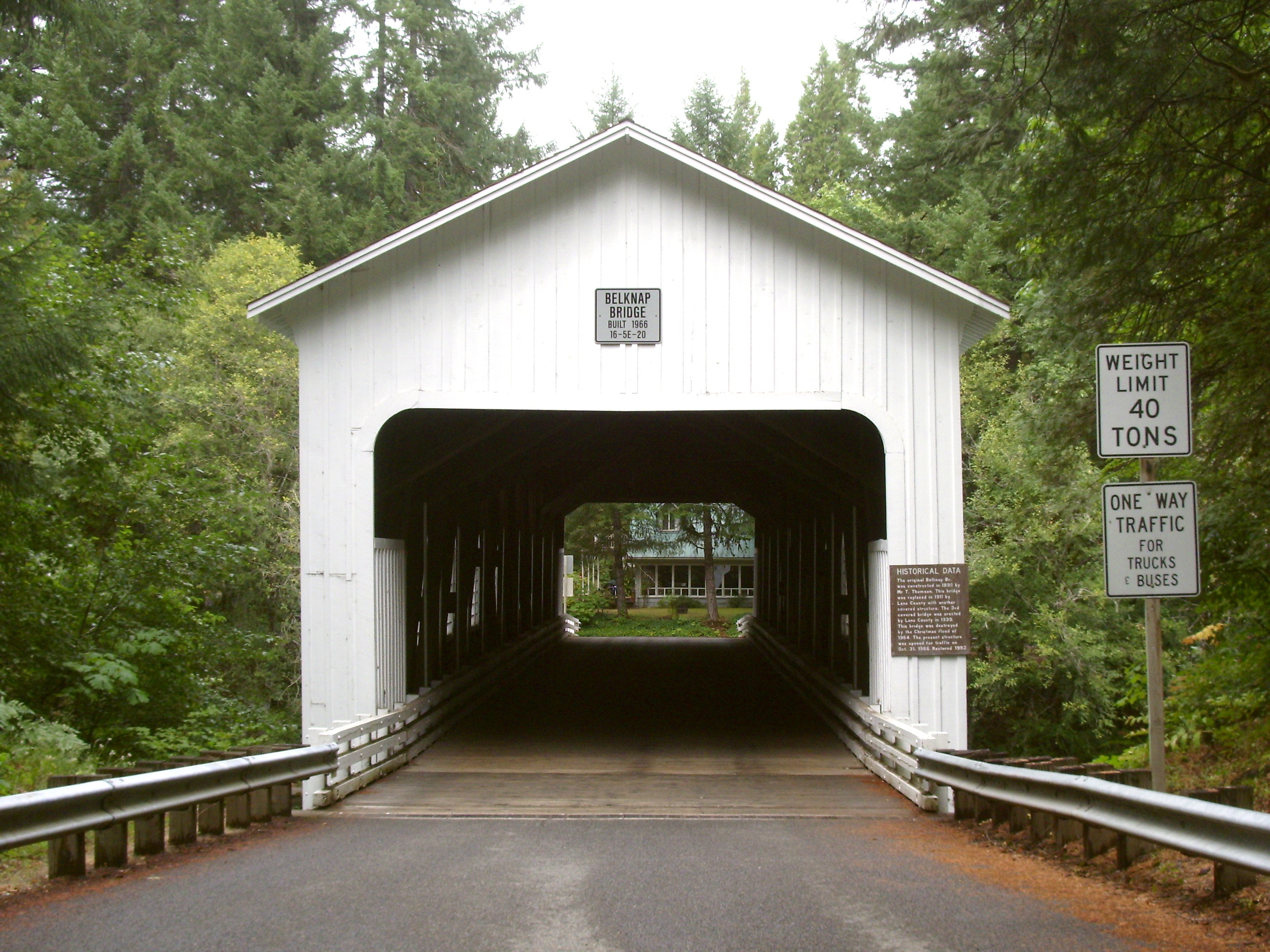
- This is the fourth Belknap Bridge built at this site

- Location within Oregon Location within the United States
- Location: McKenzie River in western Oregon, U.S.
- Nearest city: Rainbow, Oregon, U.S.
- Coordinates: 44.16803°N 122.22836°W
- Built: 1966
- Architect: Oregon Bridge Corporation
- Architectural style: Howe Truss
- NRHP reference No.: 79002097
- Added to NRHP: 1979

The Belknap Bridge (also McKenzie River Bridge) crosses the McKenzie River near the unincorporated community of Rainbow in Lane County, Oregon, United States. It is approximately three miles west of the town of McKenzie Bridge which is named after the bridge. It is the fourth covered bridge built on the site. The bridge is well maintained and open to traffic. The Belknap Bridge is listed on the National Register of Historic Places.

== History ==
Lane County was the first in Oregon to build covered bridges on a large scale. Today, the county has more surviving covered bridges than any other county west of the Mississippi River, a total of 17 bridges, including 14 that are still open to traffic. There has been a covered bridge at the Belknap Bridge site since 1890 as four different bridge structures.

The original Belknap Bridge was built in 1890 by Mr. T. Thomson. It was named for a pioneer family that settled in the McKenzie River area, Rollin S. Belknap, who discovered and developed Belknap Springs approximately nine miles upstream from the bridge. His son, J. H. Belknap, was involved in promoting a toll road over McKenzie Pass in the early 1870s.

Traffic weakened the structure over time, so Lane County replaced it in 1911. The second bridge was replaced in 1939. That bridge, however, was destroyed in the Pacific Northwest flood of 1964. The current bridge opened in 1966. In 1975, louvered windows were added to the south side of the structure to improve the bridge's interior light. The bridge structure was strengthened and the exterior repaired in 1992. In 2002, a new roof was installed as part of a general bridge renovation project.

Because of its unique scenic beauty and its importance to Oregon's transportation history, the Belknap Bridge was listed on the National Register of Historic Places in 1979. Today, Lane County's Engineering Division maintains the covered bridges that are open to traffic, including the Belknap Bridge.

== Structure ==
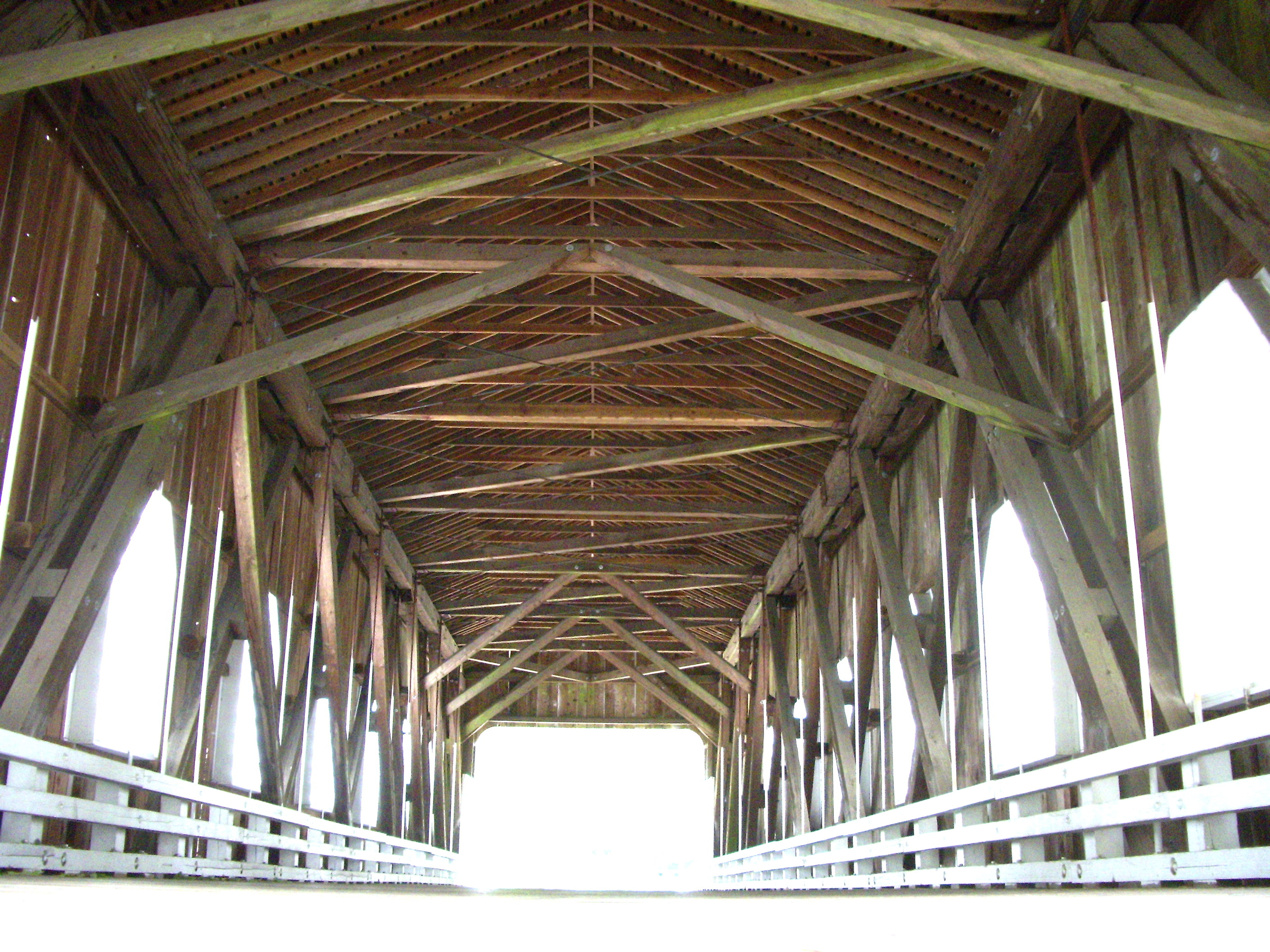
Howe truss system supports Belknap Bridge

The current Belknap Bridge was designed for Lane County by the Oregon Bridge Corporation of Springfield, Oregon, as a classic covered bridge. It is 120 feet (37 m) long, containing a single span supported by a Howe truss system. Its maximum carrying capacity of 39 short tons (35 t) is to accommodate logging trucks. The bridge rests on two concrete foundation piers. Its wooden floor planks and shingled roof are in good condition, as is the weatherboard housing that protects the Howe truss infrastructure from the elements.

Most of Oregon's covered bridges, including the Belknap Bridge, were built using the Howe truss system, developed in 1840 by the Massachusetts architect William Howe. The system uses heavy timbers reinforced with iron or steel rods. The trusses have central beams and crossed timbers with adjustable, vertical iron rods to support the structural load.

== See also ==
- List of bridges on the National Register of Historic Places in Oregon
- List of Oregon covered bridges
