= McKenzie Bridge, Oregon =

Unincorporated community in the state of Oregon, United States

- Unincorporated community
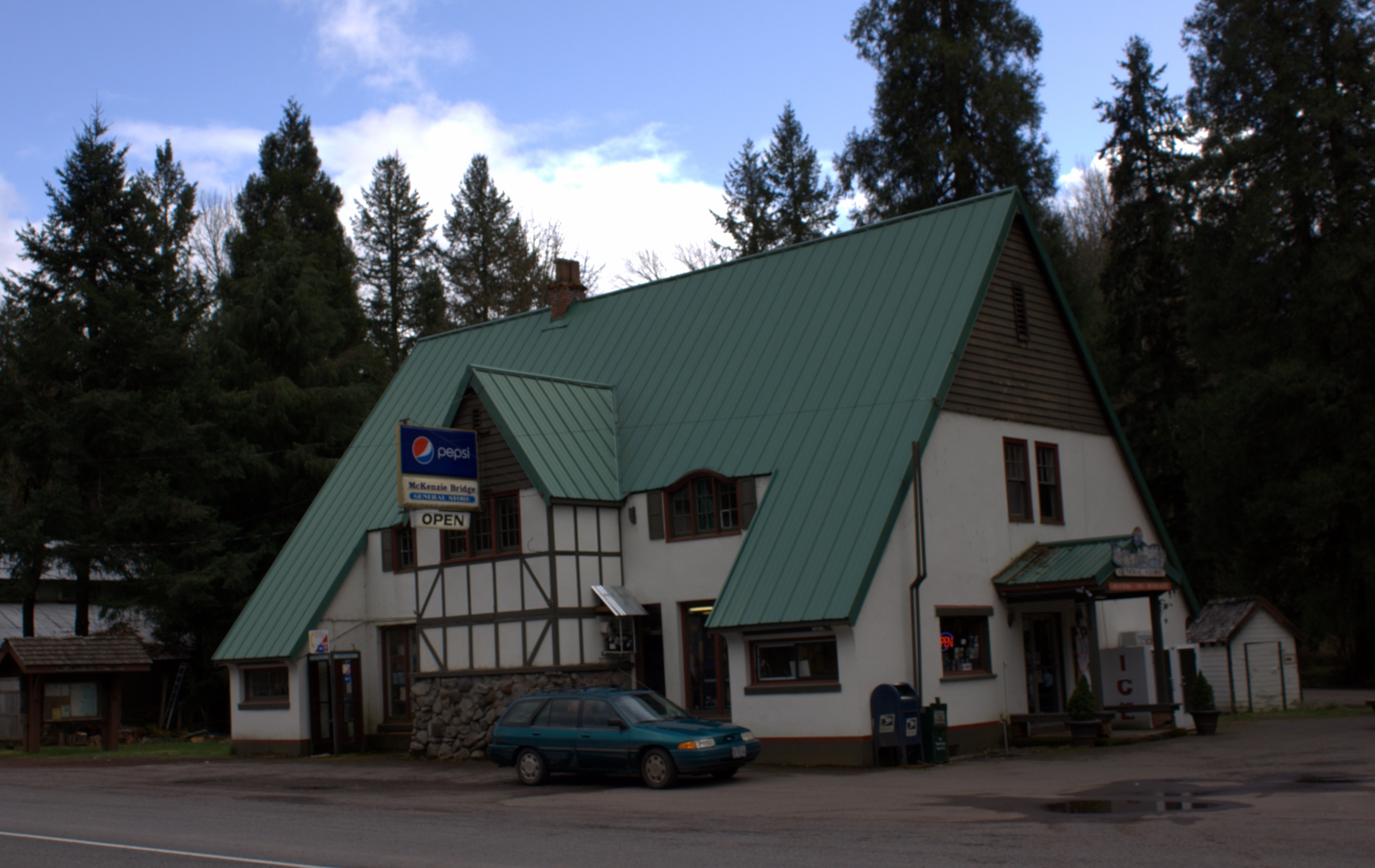
- General store at McKenzie Bridge

- Location within Oregon Location within the United States
- Coordinates: 44°10′30″N 122°09′50″W
- Country: United States
- State: Oregon
- County: Lane
- Elevation: 1,362 ft (415 m)
- Time zone: UTC-8 (Pacific (PST))
  - Summer (DST): UTC-7 (PDT)
- ZIP code: 97413
- Area codes: 458 and 541
- GNIS feature ID: 1123987

McKenzie Bridge is an unincorporated community in Lane County, Oregon, United States, on the McKenzie River and within Willamette National Forest. It is along Oregon Route 126, about 53 miles (85 km) east of Eugene, between Rainbow and Belknap Springs. The McKenzie Bridge State Airport is about 4 miles (6.4 km) east of the community.

McKenzie Bridge was the home of the National Register of Historic Places listed Log Cabin Inn until March 29, 2006, when it was destroyed by fire. Some historic auxiliary buildings remain.

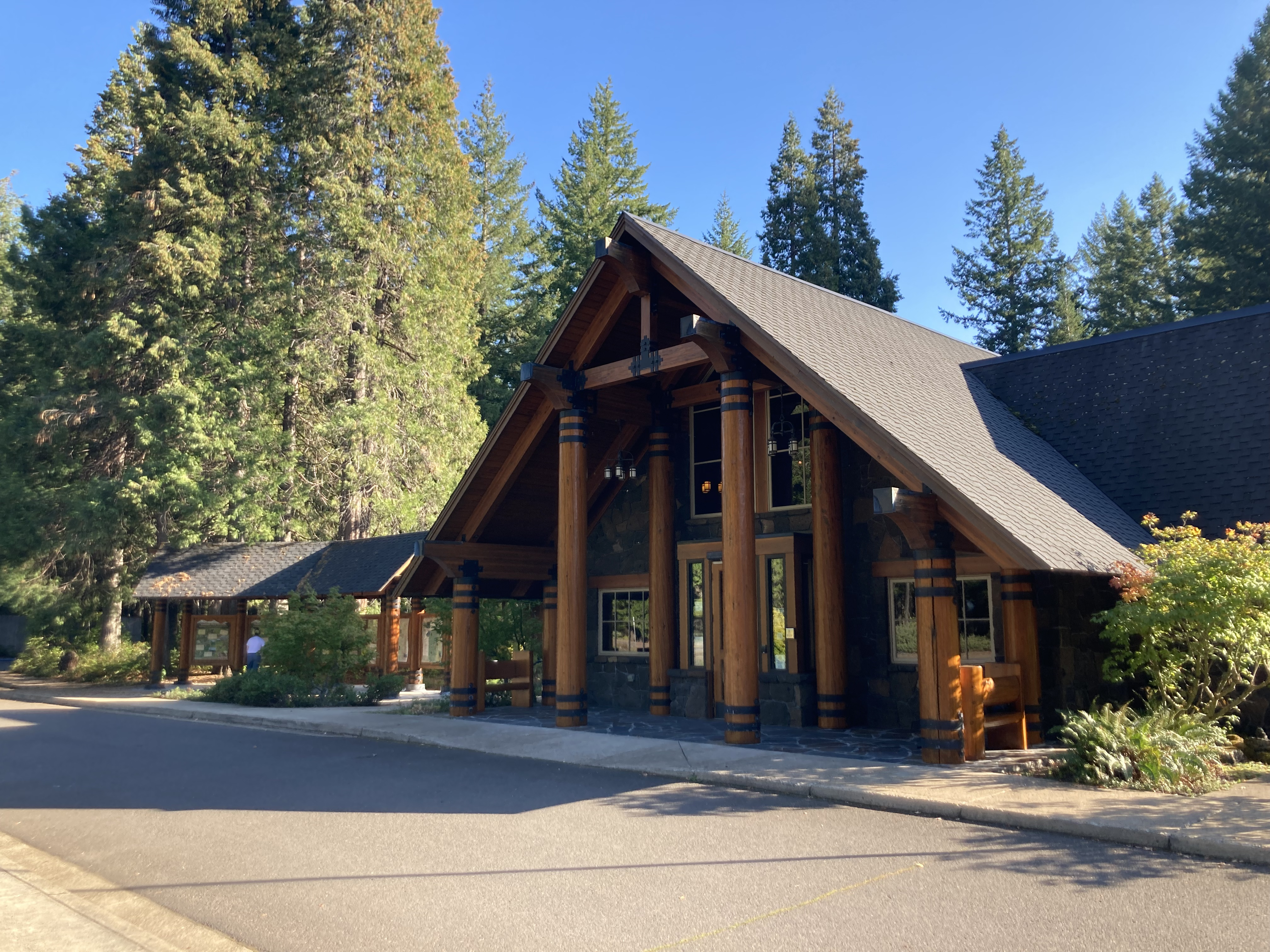
McKenzie River Ranger Station

The McKenzie River Ranger Station, originally the site of the 1934 Civilian Conservation Corps Camp Belknap, is located in McKenzie Bridge. Jennie B. Harris County Park, St. Benedict’s Lodge, and Loloma Lodge are nearby.

== Climate ==
This region experiences warm (but not hot) and dry summers, with no average monthly temperatures above 71.6 °F (22.0 °C). According to the Köppen Climate Classification system, McKenzie Bridge has a warm-summer Mediterranean climate, abbreviated "Csb" on climate maps.

Climate data for McKenzie River Ranger Station (1991–2020 normals, extremes 1902–1913, 1931–present)
Month	Jan	Feb	Mar	Apr	May	Jun	Jul	Aug	Sep	Oct	Nov	Dec	Year
Record high °F (°C)	67 (19)	79 (26)	84 (29)	94 (34)	106 (41)	113 (45)	108 (42)	111 (44)	108 (42)	98 (37)	79 (26)	66 (19)	113 (45)
Mean daily maximum °F (°C)	43.5 (6.4)	47.1 (8.4)	52.8 (11.6)	61.0 (16.1)	70.5 (21.4)	77.0 (25.0)	86.1 (30.1)	85.6 (29.8)	76.1 (24.5)	59.3 (15.2)	47.4 (8.6)	41.0 (5.0)	62.3 (16.8)
Daily mean °F (°C)	37.3 (2.9)	39.4 (4.1)	43.0 (6.1)	49.1 (9.5)	56.5 (13.6)	61.8 (16.6)	68.3 (20.2)	67.5 (19.7)	60.5 (15.8)	49.3 (9.6)	41.1 (5.1)	36.0 (2.2)	50.8 (10.4)
Mean daily minimum °F (°C)	31.2 (−0.4)	31.8 (−0.1)	33.3 (0.7)	37.1 (2.8)	42.6 (5.9)	46.5 (8.1)	50.6 (10.3)	49.4 (9.7)	44.9 (7.2)	39.3 (4.1)	34.8 (1.6)	30.9 (−0.6)	39.4 (4.1)
Record low °F (°C)	−3 (−19)	0 (−18)	10 (−12)	20 (−7)	22 (−6)	23 (−5)	31 (−1)	28 (−2)	22 (−6)	18 (−8)	3 (−16)	−5 (−21)	−5 (−21)
Average precipitation inches (mm)	10.52 (267)	7.12 (181)	7.92 (201)	6.76 (172)	4.44 (113)	2.79 (71)	0.69 (18)	0.93 (24)	2.41 (61)	6.20 (157)	10.45 (265)	11.26 (286)	71.49 (1,816)
Source: NOAA
