= Wallsburg, Utah =

Town in the state of Utah, United States

- Town
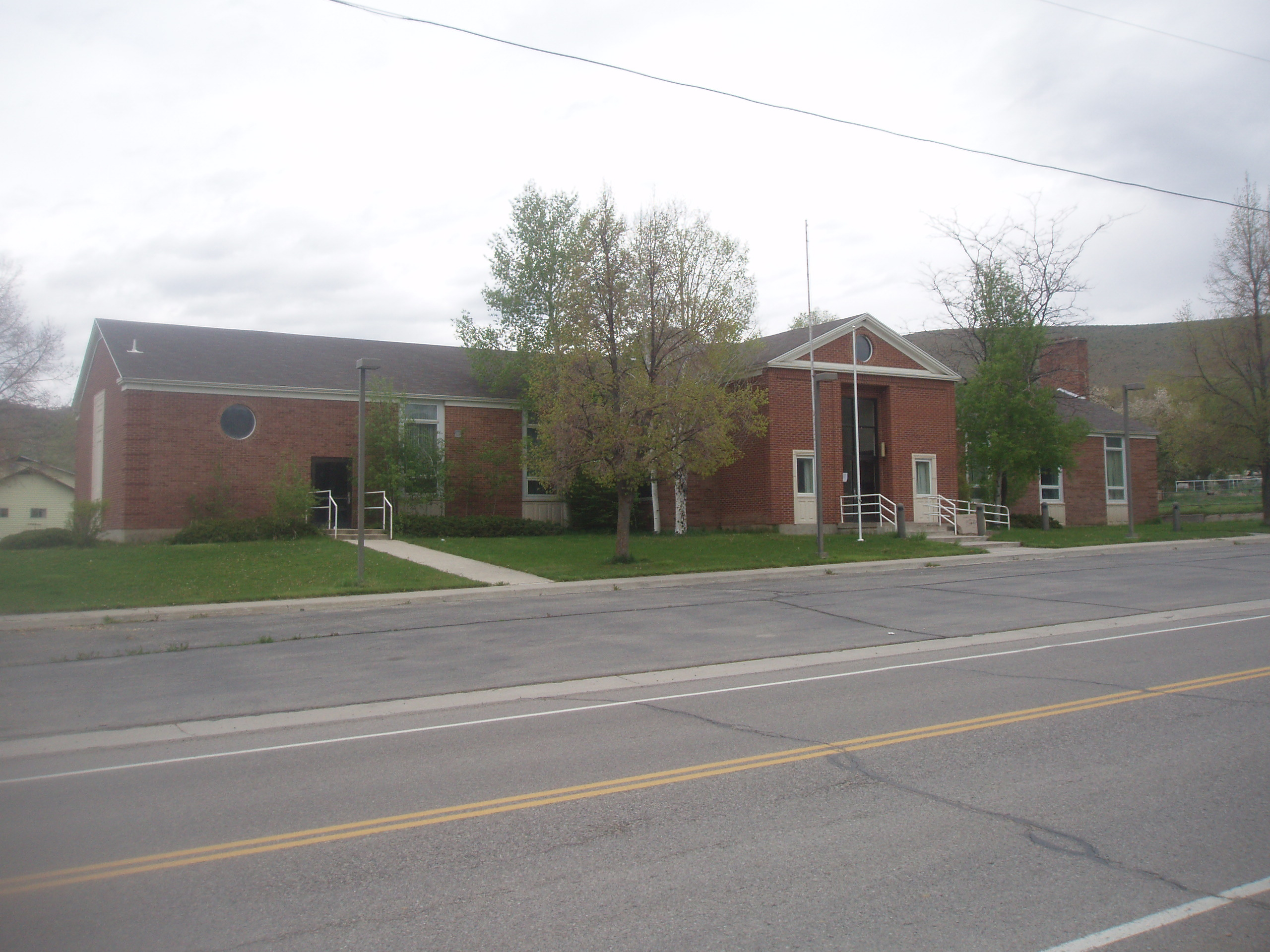
- Wallsburg Community Center

- Location in Wasatch County and the state of Utah
- Coordinates: 40°23′13″N 111°25′10″W
- Country: United States
- State: Utah
- County: Wasatch
- Named for: William Madison Wall

Area
  - Total: 0.63 sq mi (1.63 km^{2})
  - Land: 0.63 sq mi (1.63 km^{2})
  - Water: 0 sq mi (0.00 km^{2})
- Elevation: 5,761 ft (1,756 m)

Population (2020)
  - Total: 290
  - Density: 612/sq mi (236.3/km^{2})
- Time zone: UTC-7 (Mountain (MST))
  - Summer (DST): UTC-6 (MDT)
- ZIP code: 84082
- Area code: 435
- FIPS code: 49-80970
- GNIS feature ID: 2413443
- Website: wallsburg.gov

Wallsburg is a town in Wasatch County, Utah, United States. It is part of the Salt Lake City metropolitan area. The population was 290 at the 2020 census. Wallsburg was established in 1861, and was named for William Madison Wall.

== Geography ==
According to the United States Census Bureau, the town has a total area of 0.5 square miles (1.3 km^{2}), all land.

== Demographics ==
Historical population
Census	Pop.	Note	%±
1880	347		—
1890	396		14.1%
1900	528		33.3%
1910	493		−6.6%
1920	300		−39.1%
1930	240		−20.0%
1940	233		−2.9%
1950	207		−11.2%
1960	180		−13.0%
1970	211		17.2%
1980	239		13.3%
1990	252		5.4%
2000	274		8.7%
2010	250		−8.8%
2020	290		16.0%
U.S. Decennial Census

As of the census of 2010, there were 250 people living in the town. The racial makeup of the town was 99.6% White, and 0.4% from two or more races. Hispanic or Latino of any race were 2.4% of the population.

As of the census of 2000, there were 274 people, 83 households, and 73 families living in the town. The population density was 543.0 people per square mile (209.7/km^{2}). There were 93 housing units at an average density of 184.3 per square mile (71.2/km^{2}). The racial makeup of the town was 99.64% White and 0.36% Native American. Hispanic or Latino of any race were 0.73% of the population.

There were 83 households, out of which 45.8% had children under the age of 18 living with them, 83.1% were married couples living together, 4.8% had a female householder with no husband present, and 12.0% were non-families. 12.0% of all households were made up of individuals, and 10.8% had someone living alone who was 65 years of age or older. The average household size was 3.30 and the average family size was 3.56.

In the town, the population was spread out, with 31.0% under the age of 18, 13.1% from 18 to 24, 23.7% from 25 to 44, 20.4% from 45 to 64, and 11.7% who were 65 years of age or older. The median age was 32 years. For every 100 females, there were 106.0 males. For every 100 females age 18 and over, there were 101.1 males.

The median income for a household in the town was $55,313, and the median income for a family was $59,375. Males had a median income of $39,375 versus $21,042 for females. The per capita income for the town was $21,165. About 5.1% of families and 3.3% of the population were below the poverty line, including 1.8% of those under the age of eighteen and none of those 65 or over.

== Government ==
Both during the 2011 and 2013 election years, the town recorder failed to open the filing period or schedule the election, so the current council and mayor were appointed to serve a 2-year-term in 2011 and another 2-year term in 2013. The current mayor of Wallsburg is Celeni Richins.

== See also ==
- List of cities and towns in Utah
