= Vinson Knight =

American Mormon leader (1804–1842)

- Born: March 14, 1804; Norwich, Massachusetts, US
- Died: July 31, 1842 (aged 38); Nauvoo, Illinois, US
- Known for: Counselor to Bishop Newel K. Whitney in the early Latter Day Saint movement
- Spouse: Martha McBride
- Children: 7
- Parents: Randolphus Knight (father); Rizpah Lee (mother)

Vinson Knight (March 14, 1804 – July 31, 1842) was an early leader in the Latter Day Saint movement. He served as a counselor in the bishopric in Kirtland, Ohio, from 1835 to 1838, then as bishop in Adam-ondi-Ahman in Daviess County, Missouri, from 1838 to 1839, and finally as bishop of the Lower Ward in Nauvoo, Illinois, having been called by Joseph Smith through revelation to that office in January 1841. Knight served as bishop in Nauvoo until his sudden death at age 38.

== Early years ==
Knight was born March 14, 1804, in Norwich, Massachusetts, to Dr Randolphus E Knight and Rizpah Lee (daughter of American Revolutionary War Captain Sherebiah Lee). Following his father's death when he was five years old, his mother moved the family to upstate New York. Here Knight married Martha McBride, daughter of itinerant pre-Campbellite minister Daniel McBride and Abigail Mead, on July 26, 1826. They ran a farm in Perrysburg, New York and had seven children: five sons and two daughters.

Starting in 1833, members of the McBride family began converting to the Latter Day Saint church. Knight was baptized into the church in 1834 in Perrysburg, after having been taught in his home by church founder Joseph Smith.

Vinson Knight and Horatio G. Knight, an American politician, who served as the 30th lieutenant governor of Massachusetts from 1875 to 1879, were first cousins.

== Kirtland and Missouri period ==
In June 1835, Knight moved his family to Kirtland, Ohio, to gather with other Latter Day Saints. They resided in a \home on the corner of Cowdery and Joseph Streets near the Kirtland Temple. (This home is still standing.) Knight was called as a counselor in the Kirtland bishopric. Vinson and Martha received their patriarchal blessings on June 24, 1835, at the hands of Joseph Smith Sr. Martha gave birth to one son in Kirtland, Nathaniel Knight, in 1835 (for whom the name was selected by Joseph Smith Sr.); he died on October 31, 1836. Knight was ordained an elder and a high priest earlier that year. In January 1837, Knight joined the Kirtland Safety Society. He also saw the completion of the Kirtland Temple and the dedication of the School of the Prophets.

In September 1837, Knight left for Missouri with Joseph Smith and was away for two months. Deep apostasy and persecution took hold in Kirtland during that period. The Knight family moved with other faithful Latter Day Saints in the spring of 1838 to Missouri, arriving at the end of May 1838 at Far West, Caldwell County, Missouri. They settled in Adam-ondi-Ahman in Daviess County, where Knight was appointed bishop on June 28, 1838. Very quickly persecution again descended upon the Knight family and others. Within a very brief period, Knight and his family, suffering greatly, were driven from their home by a mob. Knight later executed an affidavit in October 1839 itemizing a bill of damages against the State of Missouri for $10,000 in compensation for property lost and expenses incurred during the expulsion—one of the largest claims made by a Latter Day Saint family for damages suffered in Missouri.

Forced to flee Missouri following Governor Bogg's Extermination Order, Knight and his family found refuge with some friends in Pike County, near the Mississippi River, where Martha gave birth to Martha Abigail Knight on February 9, 1839.

== Nauvoo period ==
In April 1839, Knight traveled to Iowa to purchase land on which the Latter Day Saints could settle. He and his family moved to Commerce (later Nauvoo), Hancock County, Illinois. Here, on land that Knight helped select, he constructed a two-story red brick home on Main Street, said to be the first brick house in Nauvoo, on the same block as the homes of apostles Brigham Young and John Taylor. (This home is still standing.)

In Nauvoo, Knight was actively involved in community and religious affairs. Soon after arriving in Nauvoo, Knight was designated aide-de-camp to Joseph Smith in the Nauvoo Legion. In January 1841, Knight was called as bishop of the Lower Ward in Nauvoo. He also served as a member of the first Nauvoo city council and as Regent of the University of the City of Nauvoo. During the April 1841 general conference, apostle Ezra T. Benson stayed with the Knight family.

The story is told that Vinson's wife, Martha, knew something was worrying her husband and he could not seem to tell her about it. One evening, as Martha was sitting in the grape arbor behind the house, Vinson returned home carrying a basket. He explained to Martha that he had taken some fruit and vegetables to Philindia Clark Eldredge Merrick (Myrick), widow of Levi N. Merrick, whose husband had been killed in the Hawn's Mill Massacre. Vinson explained to Martha that he had been told to enter plural marriage and that, if he had to, this Sister Merrick would be the one he could help best. Martha's reply is said to have been, "Is that all?"

Because the conversation at the grape arbor apparently occurred in the fall of 1841, it is possible Vinson's initial activities related to plural marriage were not authorized by Joseph Smith. As Helen Mar Kimball would relate, "Before my father [Heber C. Kimball] ever heard that such a principle had been revealed to Joseph Smith he said to some friends in my hearing that if 'all things were to be restored again as they were in the beginning,' as the scriptures declare them, the principle of a plurality of wives must also be restored".

However it appears that by the spring of 1842, Vinson Knight had repented of any unauthorized plural marriage activity he may have been engaged in. This is seen in the minutes of the Women's Relief Society of Nauvoo, of which Knight's wife, Martha, was a founding member. The organization meeting was held on March 17, 1842, in Nauvoo, which also happened to be Martha's 37th birthday. The founding purpose of Relief Society was "not only to relieve the poor, but to save souls." Martha Knight was possibly present on March 31, 1842, when Emma Smith read a letter warning the women of Relief Society about seducers. The letter was signed by Vinson Knight along with Joseph Smith, Hyrum Smith, Brigham Young, and Heber C. Kimball. An excerpt reads:

"...such men... say they have authority from Joseph, or the First Presidency, or any other Presidency of the Church; and thus, with a lie in their mouth, deceive and debauch the innocent, under the assumption that they are authoriz'd from these sources? May God Forbid!

"there are those, and we therefore warn you, & forewarn you, in the name of the Lord, to check & destroy any faith that any innocent person may have in any such character; for we do not want any one to believe any thing as coming from us... you are authoriz'd on the very first intimation of the kind, to denounce them as such, & shun them as the flying fiery serpent, whether they are prophets, Seers, or revelators; Patriarchs, twelve Apostles, Elders, Priests, Mayers, Generals, City Councillors, Aldermen, Marshalls, Police, Lord Mayors or the Devil, are alike culpable & shall be damned for such evil practices..."

== Death and legacy ==
Just when he was increasingly involved in the affairs of Nauvoo, Knight suddenly took ill and died on July 31, 1842, in Nauvoo. Joseph Smith preached at the funeral, stating that Knight was the "best friend he ever had on earth." One month later, on September 3, 1842, Martha lost her and Vinson's youngest child, Rodolphus Elderkin Knight, who was less than one year old.

After Vinson's untimely death in July 1842, Martha would enter into covenant with Joseph Smith.

In 1843, William Clayton documented a conversation he had with Joseph Smith discussing "delicate matters." The 23 June journal entry reads in part: "Also Brother Knight he [Joseph Smith] gave him one but he [Knight] went to loose conduct and he [Joseph Smith] could not save him." As one other men mentioned in the 23 June journal entry had died and another had suffered a heart attack, the reference to saving may refer to the fact that Vinson died despite likely attempts to prolong his life via faith healing, rather than asserting that Vinson was damned for the "loose conduct."

When it became possible to solemnize eternal marriages with deceased spouses in the Nauvoo temple in 1845-1846, Martha chose to be eternally united or sealed to Joseph Smith rather than Vinson. Heber C. Kimball acted as Joseph's proxy in the ceremony, and thus became Martha's husband "for time".

The woman traditionally considered to have become Knight's plural wife in 1841, Philindia Clark Eldredge Merrick (Myrick), also declined to unite herself with Vinson in eternity.

Notable descendants of Knight include Francis M. Gibbons and Larry W. Gibbons, both of whom became general authorities in the Church of Jesus Christ of Latter-day Saints (LDS Church).

== Possible first Presiding Bishop ==
According to an analysis by D. Michael Quinn, Knight could be considered the first Presiding Bishop of the LDS Church.

Edward Partridge, the first man called to be a Mormon bishop, died in 1840. This was before Vinson Knight was called "to preside over the bishopric" (See D&C 124:141). Though the office of Presiding Bishop arguably didn't exist until 1847, Edward Partridge, rather than Vinson Knight, is recognized by the LDS Church as the first Presiding Bishop.

== See also ==
- Belnap Family Organization
