= Log Cabin Inn Ensemble =

- U.S. National Register of Historic Places
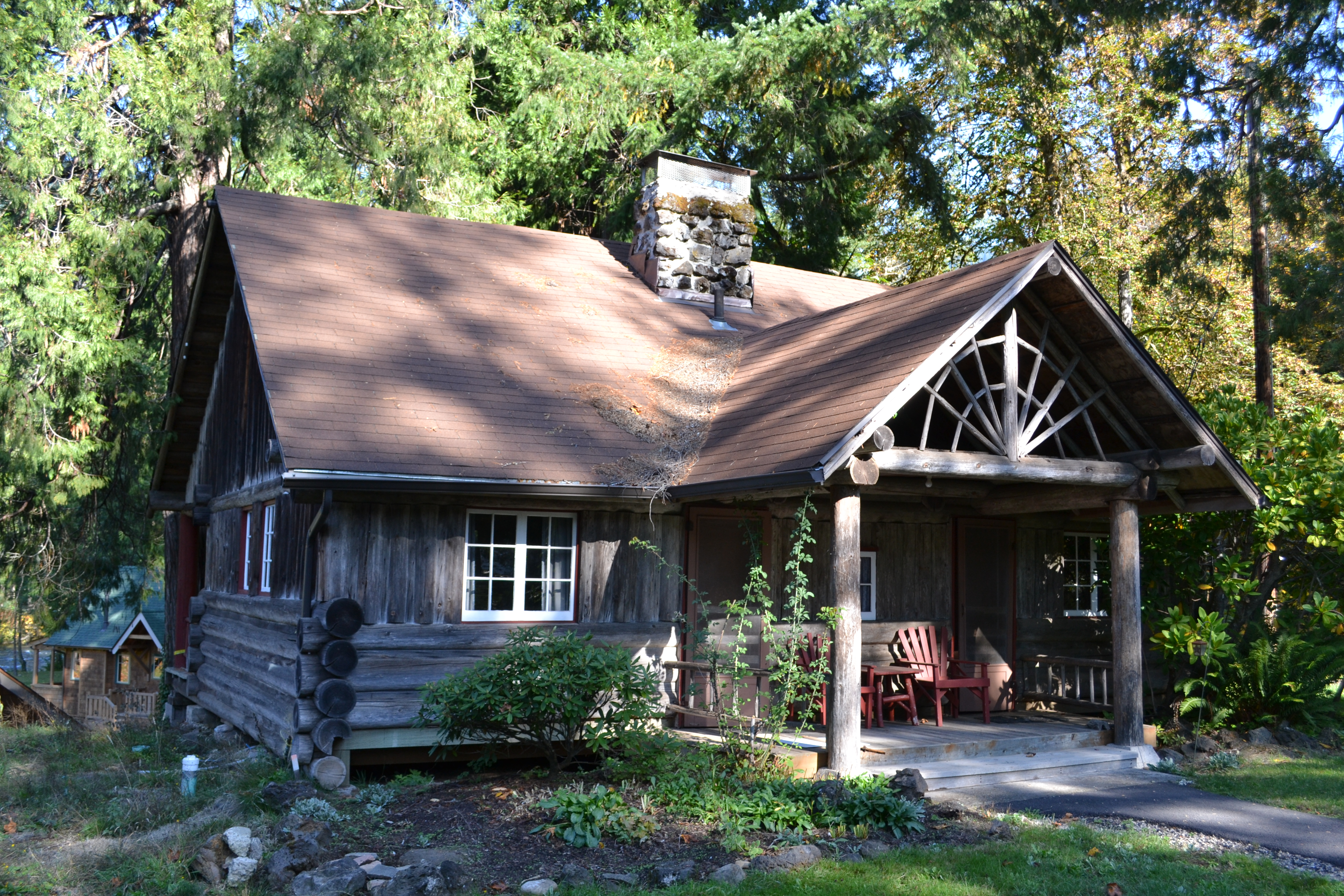

- Location within Oregon Location within the United States
- Location: 56483 McKenzie Hiqhway, McKenzie Bridge, Oregon
- Coordinates: 44°10′27″N 122°09′33″W
- Area: 8 acres (3.2 ha)
- Built: 1907
- Built by: Coy Lansbury; Freeman Lansbury
- Architectural style: Rustic
- NRHP reference No.: 02001486
- Added to NRHP: December 4, 2002

The Log Cabin Inn Ensemble, located in McKenzie Bridge, Oregon, is listed on the National Register of Historic Places.

Destroyed by fire, March 29, 2006.

== See also ==
- National Register of Historic Places listings in Lane County, Oregon
