= Camp Belknap =

Summer camp in Tuftonboro, New Hampshire, US

Coordinates: 43°38′34″N 71°17′12″W

YMCA Camp Belknap is an all-boys summer resident camp in Tuftonboro, New Hampshire, on the shores of Lake Winnipesaukee. Founded in 1903, on Winnipesaukee's Timber Island, in the shadow of Belknap Mountain, its likely namesake. Relocated to Tuftonboro in 1907, this boys' camp was owned and operated by the New Hampshire YMCA until the demise of the state Y in 1996. It is now an independent non-profit affiliated with the national Y. Belknap celebrated its 100th year in operation in 2003, making it one of the oldest continuously operating camps in the United States.

== Facility and program ==
Camp Belknap boasts more than 288 acres (117 ha) of playfields, courts and forested land, much of it held as a conservation easement; plus one mile of lakefront property. Belknap's 31 activities include archery and riflery, tennis, soccer, baseball, basketball, and lacrosse as well as ropes course, studio art and nature/environment. Water activities include swimming, sailing, and waterskiing. Some games, such as Donut Ball, Tower Ball, and Bizou Ball, are original creations of Camp Belknap. The Nature program still awards a Wantonoit Club certificate for identifying 100 or more natural objects. This program, begun in 1910 at Camp Belknap by leader H.W. Brown, soon to become a professor of rhetoric at Colby College, spread to scores of US camps and even abroad.

== Community ==
Coming from all corners of the country (and the world), Belknappers are aged 8 to 16 years old and live in cabins clustered by age in five divisions of six cabins each, Cadets, Juniors, Middlers, Besserers, and Seniors. Each cabin contains nine or ten campers and one cabin leader, and potentially a cabin leader in training.

At Camp Belknap the title 'Leader' is preferred over the word 'Counselor'. For more than two decades, every cabin leader and every program head has come up through the ranks as a Belknap camper. Each summer, the Gene Clark Jr. Senior Recognition selects next year's Leader Corps from Belknap's oldest division of campers, who are then mentored and trained to form the next generation of cabin leaders.

Longevity is the rule rather than exception for campers and leaders, as noted on the large green and white longevity honor boards, also called Timi-Hi Awards, that hang in Conlon Lodge, the main all-purpose building constructed in 1930 overlooking the waterfront. It is named for "Pa" and "Ma" Conlon, influential directors from 1917 to 1939. The division for the second oldest campers is known as the Besserer Division, for Reid and Peg Besserer, who led Camp Belknap from 1939-1959. Gene and Peg Clark followed, serving from 1960 to 1988; Clark Field, a green expanse of play fields on the outer reaches of camp property, is named for them. Their son Gene and his wife Caryn were directors from 1988 to 2013. After an extensive search, Camp Belknap announced on March 15, 2013 that Seth and Stephanie Kassels would become directors upon the retirement of Gene and Caryn Clark. The appointment of Seth and Stephanie Kassels continued the trend of longevity - as Seth had been a camper, leader and program director at the camp - and family leadership. The longest tenures of all belong to two former assistant directors: Hank Adams, a Belknapper for 70 years, and former assistant director and leadership director Tom Giggi, who retired in 2014 after 53 years "under the pines".

The camp maintains one of the few extant Woodcraft Circles in the nation and continues, with some modernizations and liberties, the Woodcraft ceremony created in the early 20th century by Ernest Thompson Seton, an award-winning wildlife illustrator, naturalist, expert in Native American sign language, and a founder of the Boy Scouts of America. Seton created Woodcraft and the ceremonial lighting of its four lamps (Fortitude, Truth, Beauty, and Love) to highlight the strength of Native American culture and its usefulness to modern young people. Camp Belknap's entire community gathers as the Bald Eagle Tribe each Sunday night at dusk around a bonfire for games, stories, song, and to initiate new members.

Longtime waterfront director Dr. Chris Thurber, psychologist at Phillips Exeter Academy, is a nationally known expert on homesickness. His studies indicate that 83% of campers experience homesickness on at least one occasion at camp. He not only helps teach Belknap leaders how to counsel homesick campers, but also lectures and writes on the subject for the American Camp Association and other outlets.

== Philosophy ==
Camp Belknap's bylaws state its mission: "To preserve the unique physical and spiritual environment where young men may forever build strong character, self esteem, individual maturity and community responsibility; to acquire for life the skill of leadership and the value of good stewardship; to honor the history and traditions which are the Belknap experience; and to be a contributing citizen in the community it serves and from which it receives its benefit." Put more simply it is often stated that Belknap's mission is to make "good boys better". Belknap’s official motto echoes the old YMCA credo, "God first, the other fellow second, myself last."

Today's campers frequently employ an unofficial motto, borrowed from Woodcraft's four lamps: "Seek the joy."

== Notable alumni ==
- Manuel Del Valle, Jr., FDNY firefighter killed on 9/11, U.S. Open (tennis) chauffeur
- Roger Hayward, artist, architect, optical designer and astronomer
- Gary Hirshberg, chairman and former president and CEO, Stonyfield Farms
- Irving R. Levine, journalist
- Jon Spencer, musician
