= USS Belknap =

Two ships of the United States Navy have been named Belknap, in honor of Rear Admiral George Eugene Belknap.

- USS Belknap (DD-251), was a destroyer launched in 1919 and decommissioned in 1945.
- USS Belknap (CG-26), the lead ship of her class, was a guided missile cruiser in service from 1964 to 1995.
