= Belnap Family Organization =

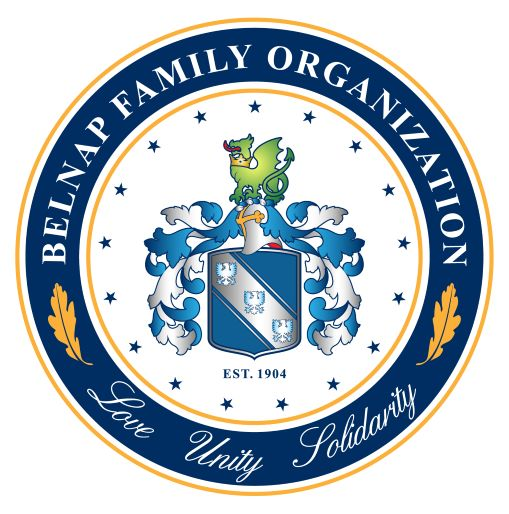
- Abbreviation: BFO
- Formation: 1904
- Type: Non-profit organization
- Purpose: "To preserve, perpetuate, and promote family solidarity" among Belnaps/Belknaps
- Headquarters: Utah, United States
- Region served: Worldwide
- Members: Descendants of Utah Mormon Pioneers Gilbert Belnap (1821-1899), Adaline Knight (1831-1919), Henrietta McBride (1821-1899), and all others related to individuals surnamed Belnap or Belknap
- Current President: Larry Julian
- Website: Belnap Family Organization

The Belnap Family Organization is a non-profit ancestral family organization that conducts primary genealogical research and preserves genealogical and other historical information on the Belnap/Belknap family surname, including the descendants of Mormon Pioneers Gilbert Belnap (1821–1899) and his plural wives Adaline Knight (1831–1919) and Henrietta McBride (1821–1899). According to its mission statement, the organization exists "to preserve, perpetuate, and promote family solidarity." It is one of the oldest and largest ancestral family organizations in existence, having been established in Utah in 1904.

== Publications, projects, and awards ==
Since 1963, the organization has periodically published the Belnap Family Crier, which contains genealogical data, historical information, and other items of family interest. In 1967 the Crier was honored by the Genealogical Society of Utah as an "outstanding publication" in genealogical publishing.

In 1968, the Belnap Family Organization was recognized by The Church of Jesus Christ of Latter-day Saints as one of the "best-organized" family organizations in existence.

The organization has sponsored the publication of several works on the lives of Gilbert Belnap, Adaline Knight, and Henrietta McBride and their extended family. It has also undertaken several large-scale genealogical research, headstone restoration, and autosomal and Y-chromosome DNA projects. It was one of the first ancestral family organizations to participate in the LDS Church's name extraction program, in England and the United States. The organization was also a leader in the first compilation of computerized family trees.

In 1997 as part of the sesquicentennial celebration of the Mormon Trail, the organization commemorated and dedicated a memorial marker in Ashland, Nebraska in honor of John McBride Belnap, a 13-month-old child of Gilbert Belnap and Adaline Knight who died of cholera in 1850 and was buried in his father's tool chest near the Saline Ford at the confluence of Salt Creek and the Platte River along the Oxbow Trail. Events held in commemoration of the life of John McBride Belnap received national coverage.

In 2010 the Belnap Family Organization was listed by FamilySearch as an exemplary ancestral family organization.

In addition to supporting ongoing family history research, artifact preservation, and LDS temple ordinance work, the organization makes available primary and secondary source documentation, through various web sites, on notable family members, including Sir Robert Belknap, Chief Justice of the Common Pleas of England from 1374 to 1388, Vinson Knight, early leader in The Church of Jesus Christ of Latter-day Saints, and Martha McBride Knight Smith Kimball, documented plural wife of Joseph Smith, Jr. and later Heber C. Kimball.

== Membership ==
Membership in the Belnap Family Organization is automatic for all descendants of Gilbert Belnap, Adaline Knight, and Henrietta McBride who are known to now number over 12,900 and are found in most states and several countries outside the U.S. Membership is also available to other persons surnamed Belnap or Belknap or who descend from such persons.

(The surname Belnap or Belknap is believed to be somewhat unusual, in that all known Belnaps or Belknaps living today are thought to descend from one man, Abraham Belknap formerly known as Beltoft, who migrated from Sawbridgeworth, England to Massachusetts about 1635. Although the surname continued in England for several centuries through other branches of the family, it has since died out in its country of origin.)

In continuous existence for more than a century, the Belnap Family Organization, a 501(c)(3) association since 1974 organized under the laws of Utah, serves as an umbrella organization through its 15 constituent branches (one for each of Gilbert Belnap's children who lived to adulthood) for sub-organizations at the grandparent and parent levels.

== Reunions ==
Under the auspices of the organization, descendants of Gilbert Belnap, Adaline Knight, and Henrietta McBride and other Belnap/Belknap relatives have met at least 48 times, starting with the first family reunion in 1904 in Hooper, Utah. Family reunions today are most typically, but not always, held on the second Saturday in August in even-numbered years.

== See also ==
- Belknap (surname)
- Gilbert Belnap
- Martha McBride Knight
- Vinson Knight
