= Belknap Stone House =

Historic house in New York, United States

- U.S. National Register of Historic Places
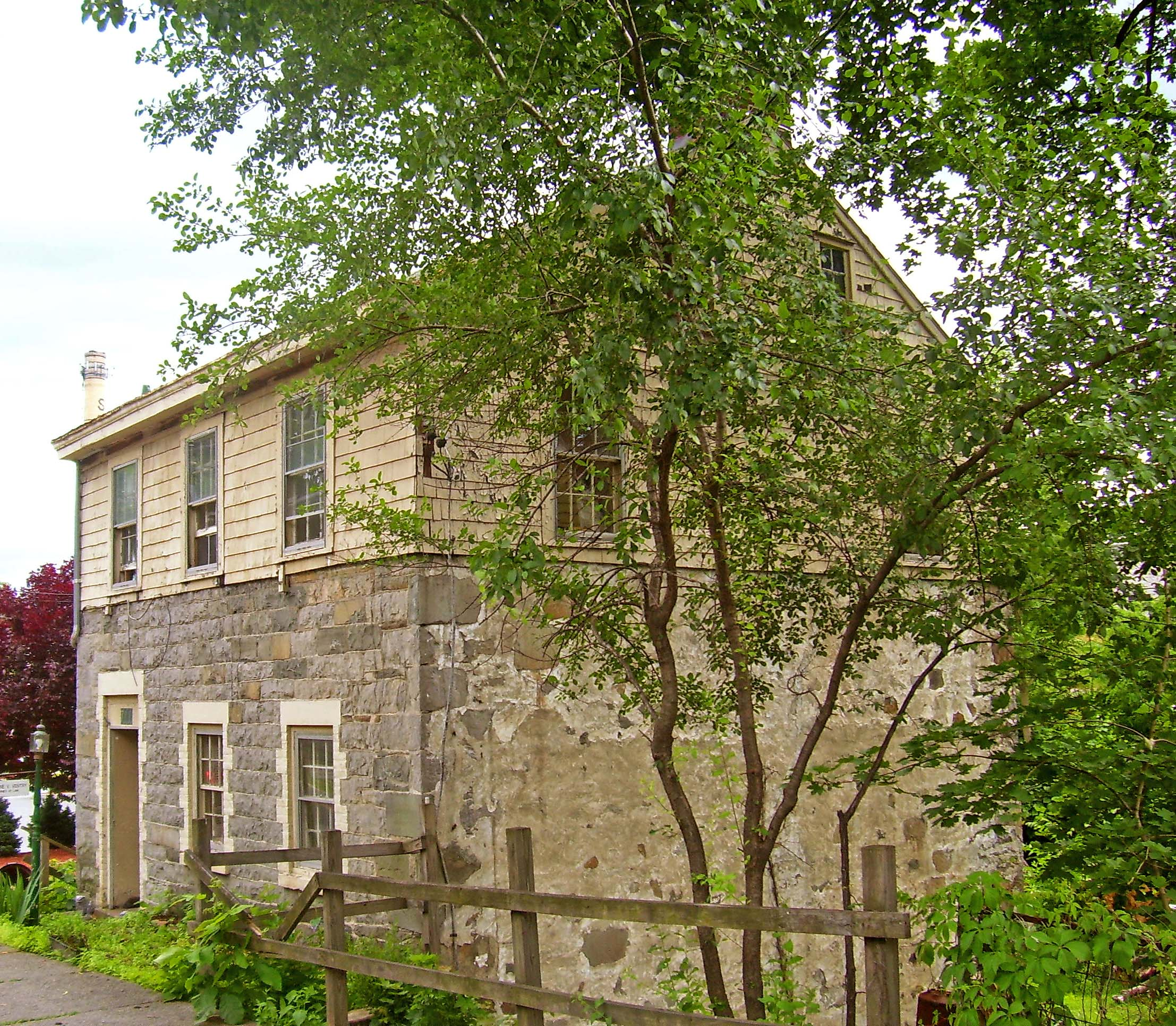
- House in 2007

- Location within New York
- Location: 154 rt 17k Newburgh, New York
- Coordinates: 41°30′06″N 74°02′27″W
- Area: less than one acre
- Built: 1760
- Architectural style: Federal, Italianate
- NRHP reference No.: 01000843
- Added to NRHP: August 15, 2001

The Belknap Stone House in Newburgh, New York, was built by Abel Belknap in the 1750s.

Abel Belknap chaired the local Committee of Safety during the war, and when the Continental Army was encamped in the Newburgh area in 1782–83, the house served as James Clinton's headquarters in the area. Today it has been restored and operates as Stone Cottage Veterinary Clinic. It was added to the National Register of Historic Places in 2001.
