= Belknap Lookout =

Human settlement in Michigan, United States of America

Coordinates: 42.9756°N 85.6633°W

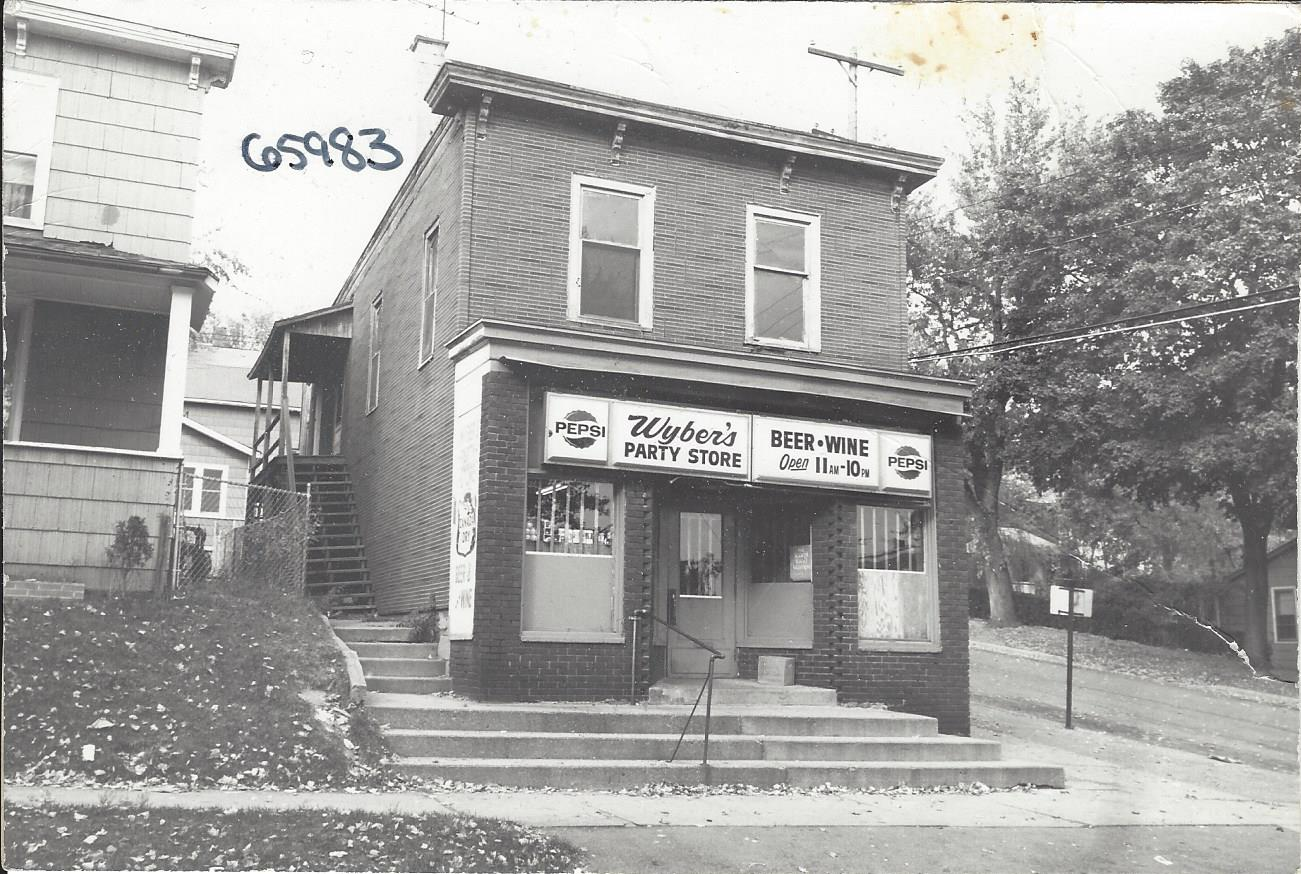

The Belknap Lookout Neighborhood is located in Grand Rapids, Michigan.

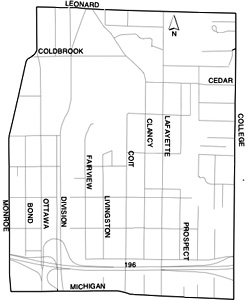
neighborhood map

The neighborhood is bound by Leonard on the North, College Ave. on the east, Crescent Street on the south, and the Grand River on the west.

== History ==
The name "Belknap Lookout" has two separate derivations. The word Belknap comes from the surname of Charles E. Belknap. Belknap was a Grand Rapids resident who came home from the Civil War in 1871 to serve Grand Rapids as the first commissioner of the Boy Scouts of America, as mayor in 1884 and as a U.S. congressman in 1888. The word Lookout comes from what is perhaps the neighborhood's most prominent feature, Belknap Hill: a 160 ft high bluff overlooking the downtown of the City of Grand Rapids.

The area which forms the Belknap Lookout Neighborhood was purchased from the government in 1831 by Charles Dexter. In 1850 the area was included in the original organization of the city of Grand Rapids.

In its early days, the area was significant for several reasons. First, the neighborhood contained the city's first cemetery. More importantly, the neighborhood contained a spring known as an excellent supply of drinking water. Shortly after the spring's discovery, water pipelines were built connecting the water supply to downtown Grand Rapids through Michigan, Lyon and Monroe Streets. After a disastrous fire in 1873, the citizens of Grand Rapids realized they needed a larger supply of water. A water reservoir, which today holds 6 million US gallons (23,000 m^{3}) of water, was constructed within the neighborhood. This reservoir was intended to be a backup water supply for the City of Grand Rapids. In 1880, the reservoir leaked and flooded Ottawa St. In 1900, the reservoir failed again and flooded Coldbrook, Newberg, Coit, Clancy, and Bradford Streets. The latter flood caused more than a million dollars in damages.

Construction of homes, in significant numbers, did not occur within the neighborhood until 1874. Heavy construction lasted until approximately 1888. Early residents of the Belknap Lookout neighborhood included the mayor, city attorney, school principal, superintendent, bankers, newspaper editors, physicians, musicians, furniture carvers, and factory foreman. The homes on the West side of the neighborhood tend to be larger and more expensive than those on the East side.

== Unique facts and features ==
- Belknap Lookout area officially became a neighborhood in 1926
- Named after Charles E. Belknap - First Commissioner of the Boy Scouts of America, mayor of Grand Rapids, Michigan in 1884, and U.S. Congressmen in 1888
- Coit Elementary School was built in 1880 and is the oldest operating school building in the state of Michigan. It was restored in 2003 when it merged with the Vandenberg Creative Arts Academy
- Belknap Lookout contained the city's first cemetery
- A 6-million-US-gallon (23,000 m^{3}) reservoir fed from a natural spring serves the city as emergency and evening water supply. The reservoir failed in both 1880 and 1900 causing over $1 million in damages to area homes.
- Early residents of Belknap were served by a complete business district on Michigan Avenue which contained many retail stores. In 1970s this corridor began to develop into a life sciences corridor with Butterworth Hospital.
- I-196 was constructed in 1963, limiting access to the neighborhood from downtown. Fill for the construction came from Belknap Park. The eroded hillside was rebuilt into the “Earthwork” project, also known as the “X”, by Robert Morris (artist) in 1974. It is the first major art earthwork to be supported by government funds, including from the National Endowment for the Arts. It is 32% grade at its steepest part, steeper than Filbert Street in San Francisco.
- The neighborhood has two cobblestone streets built in the mid-to-late 19th century on Trowbridge St and North Ave . Local leaders designated both streets as local historic landmarks in 1975.
- Due to Belknap's unique topography, there are over 400 steps on four staircases (Newberry Between Division Ave. and Fairview Ave., Fairbanks between Fairview Ave. and Division Ave., Bradford between Prospect Ave. and North Ave., and Gill Between Clancy Ave. and Barnett St.[Unrecognized]) throughout the neighborhood

== Demographics ==
Total Population (2000): 4,234 people

Race (2000):

White 52.9%

Black 23.2%

American Indian and Alaska Native 1.3%

Asian or Pacific Islander 1.7%

Some other race 0.3%

Two or more races 5.0%

Hispanic/Latino 15.6%

Age (2000):

32% of population is under 18 -and- 7% of population is over 65

== Organizations ==
Belknap Lookout is home to several organizations and institutions

- Neighbors of Belknap Lookout Neighborhood Association
- NEW Development Corporation
- Coit School, Grand Rapids Public Schools
- Clancy Street Ministries
- Belknap Commons
- Newberry Place: A Grand Rapids Cohousing Community
