= Camp Belknap (military camp) =

1846 American encampment in Texas

Coordinates: 25.9634°N 97.2299°W

Camp Belknap was a military camp during the Mexican–American War.

== History ==
When Congress declared war on Mexico in May 1846 it authorized the raising of 50,00 volunteer troop to supplement the regular army. The volunteer soldiers arriving at Brazos Santiago General inundated Zachary Taylor, forcing him to house them in temporary encampments. In the summer of 1846 Camp Belknap was built on a long narrow rise of land. At its peak it held 7,000–8,000 troops from eight different states.

Despite one false alarm no enemy attack took place and by December the camp was completely empty.
