= Edward Belknap =

English court official (died 1521)

Sir Edward Belknap Kt
- Died: 25 March 1521
- Occupation: English court official
- Office: Surveyor of the King's Prerogative
- Predecessor: Office established
- Spouse: Alice Broun
- Children: Elizabeth Belknap
- Parent(s): Henry Belknap; Margaret Knolles

Sir Edward Belknap (died 25 March 1521) was active in the service of the English crown, both on the battlefield and as a court official, during the 15th and 16th centuries.

He fought for Henry VII at the battles of Stoke Field and Blackheath and possibly at other battles as well. In August 1508, he was appointed to the newly created office of Surveyor of the King's Prerogative. This office gave him the power to appropriate the lands and property of anyone who had violated the king's prerogative in some way, such as conviction for a felony. Additionally, the king instructed Belknap to collect debts that were owing to the Crown, as well as fines which the king himself often assessed for breaches of the law. Belknap's appointment was part of an effort by Henry VII to improve the royal finances. Belknap was a privy councillor for both Henry VII and Henry VIII. In 1520, he was most probably at the Field of the Cloth of Gold with Henry VIII.

His heir and daughter Elizabeth married Thomas Bishopp whose son became Sir Thomas Bishopp, 1st Baronet of Parham.

== Sources ==
- Richardson, Douglas (2011). Everingham, Kimball G. (ed.). Plantagenet Ancestry: A Study in Colonial and Medieval Families. Vol. I (2nd ed.). CreateSpace. ISBN 978-1461045137.
