= Belknap House =

Historic house in Nevada, United States

- U.S. National Register of Historic Places
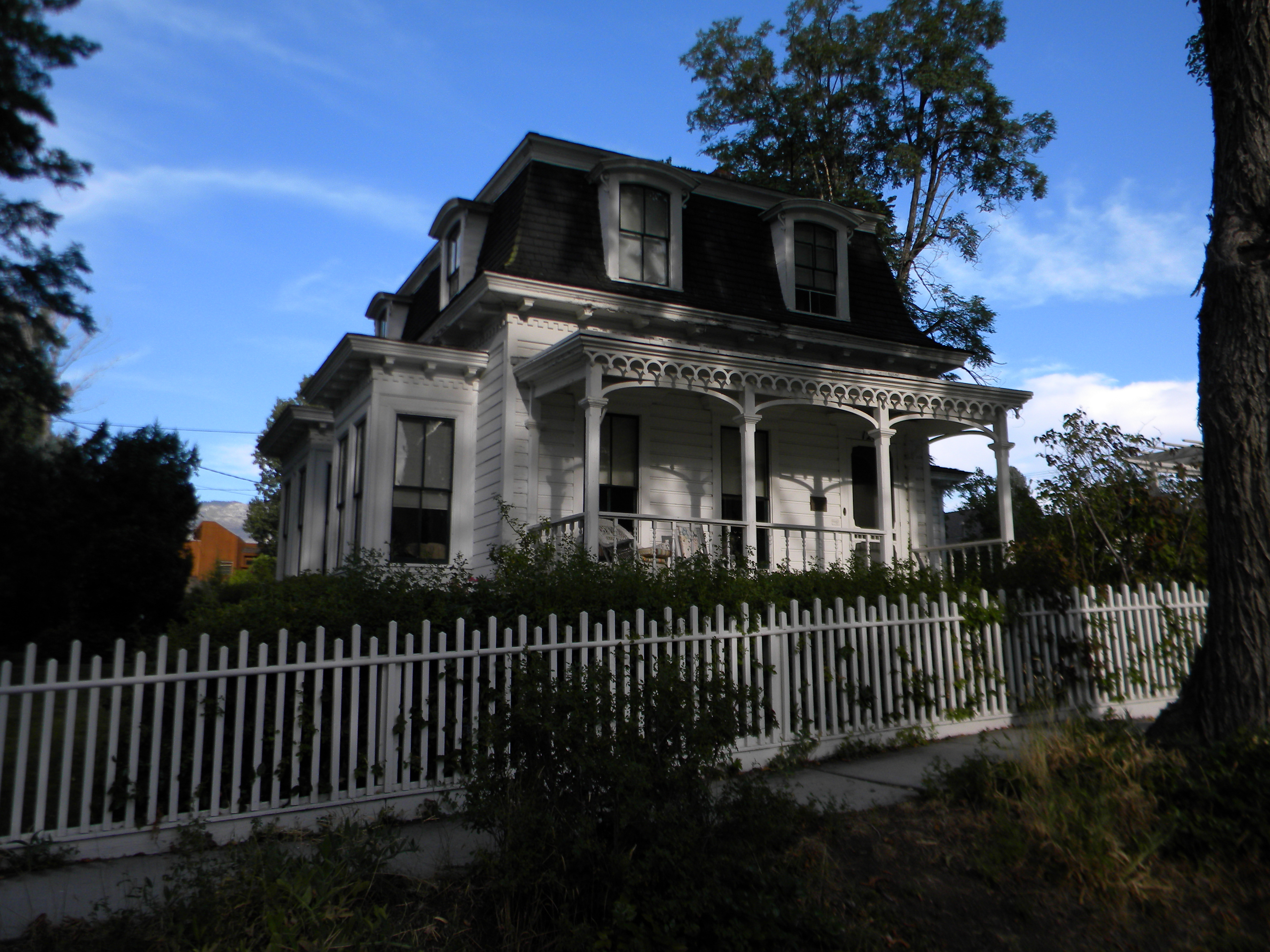

- Location within Nevada Location within the United States
- Location: 1206 N. Nevada St., Carson City, Nevada
- Coordinates: 39°10′9″N 119°46′4″W
- Area: less than one acre
- Built: 1875
- Architectural style: Second Empire
- NRHP reference No.: 97001302
- Added to NRHP: October 30, 1997

The Belknap House, at 1206 North Nevada Street in Carson City, Nevada, is a historic house built in 1875. Also known as the Barber-Belknap House or the Beck-Barber-Belknap House, it includes Second Empire architecture. It was listed on the National Register of Historic Places in 1997.

It is a two-story building with shiplap siding. It is significant as the home, during 1881 to 1908, of Charles Henry Belknap, who was Chief Justice of the Nevada Supreme Court. It is significant also for association with Henry Hudson Beck, who had it built in 1870, and to Oscar T. Barber, a businessman and Nevada State Assembly representative, who owned it in between. And it is also significant as "an excellent example of a two-story Second Empire residential structure".

During the Cold War, the only known privately built atomic fallout shelter in Carson City was added to the property.
