= Rainbow, Oregon =

Unincorporated community in the state of Oregon, United States

- Unincorporated community
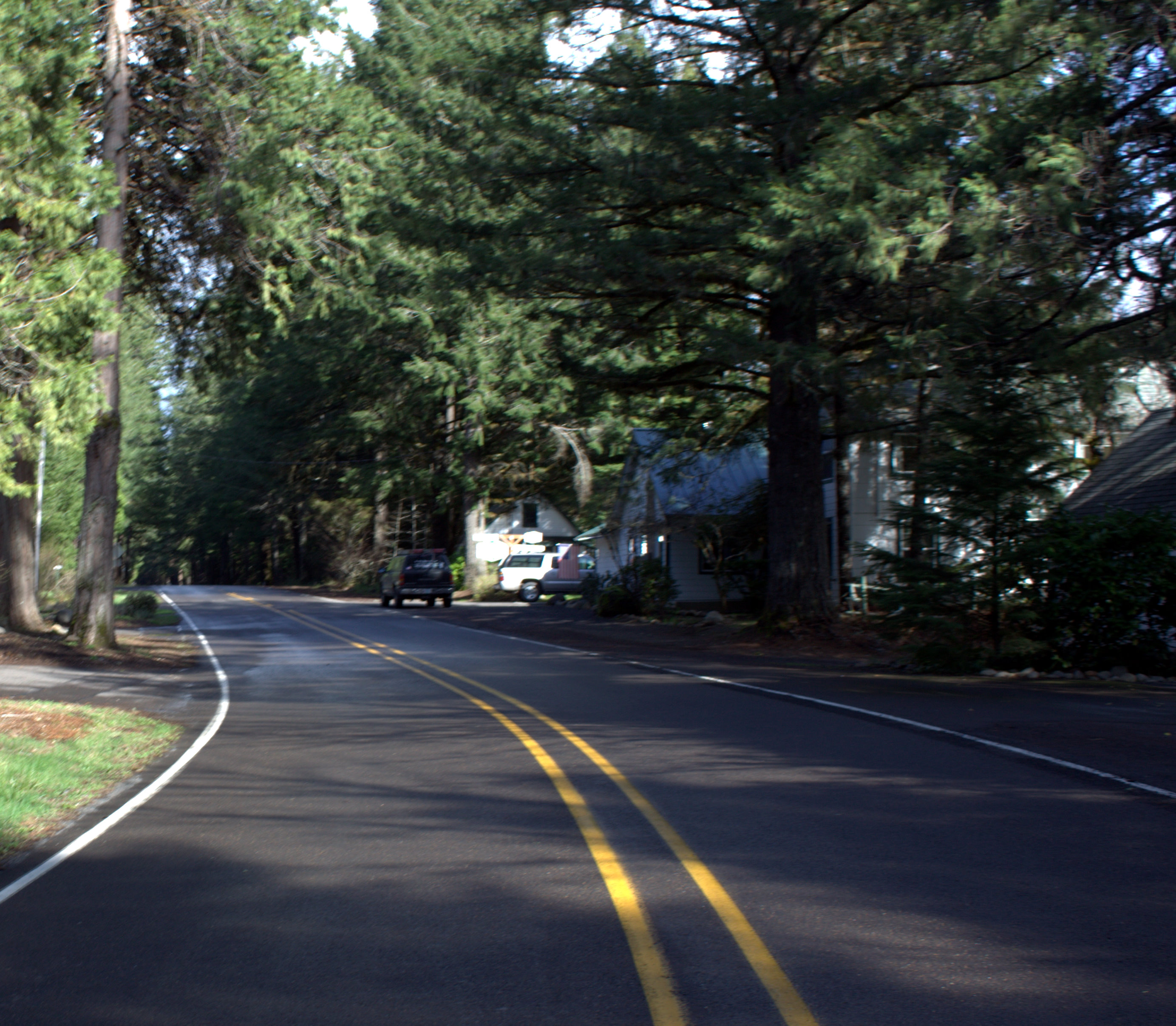
- Road and structures in Rainbow

- Location within Oregon Location within the United States
- Coordinates: 44°10′00″N 122°14′12″W
- Country: United States
- State: Oregon
- County: Lane
- Elevation: 1,211 ft (369 m)
- Time zone: UTC-8 (Pacific (PST))
  - Summer (DST): UTC-7 (PDT)
- GNIS feature ID: 1125779

Rainbow is an unincorporated community in Lane County, Oregon, United States. It lies off Oregon Route 126, northeast of Eugene. A post office was established on July 1, 1924, and closed August 31, 1937. The post office got its name from the rainbow trout that swim in the McKenzie River.
