= Warren Foote =

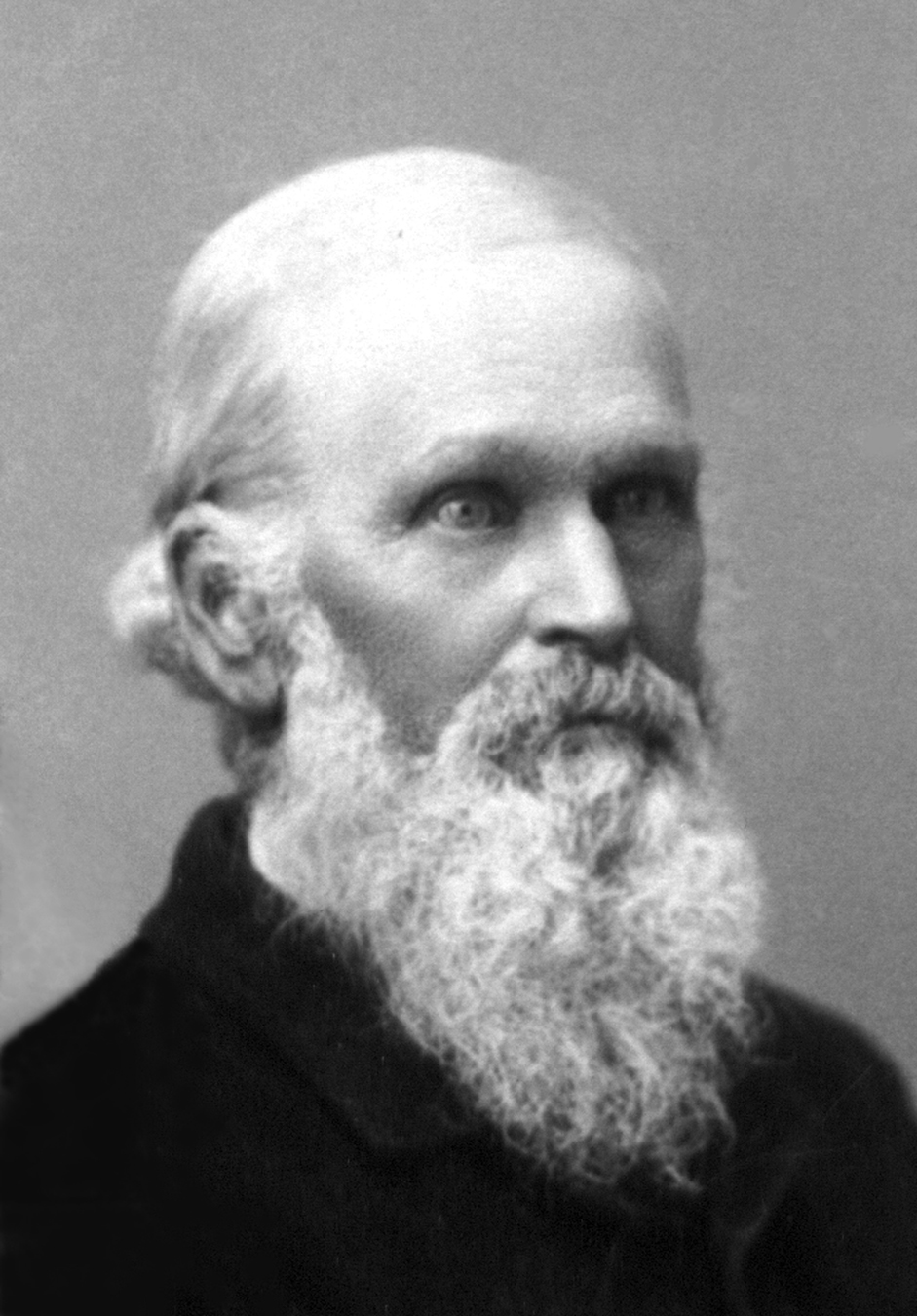

Kanab Stake Patrirch
- March 24, 1889 – July 23, 1903

Personal details
- Born: August 10, 1817; Dryden, New York, U.S.
- Died: July 23, 1903 (aged 85); Glendale, Utah, U.S.
- Resting place: Glendale Cemetery
- Spouse(s): Artemisia Sidnie Myers (m. 1843) Eliza Maria Ivie (m. 1856)
- Children: 18

Warren Foote (1817–1903) was a Mormon pioneer and settler. He was captain of a company which crossed the plains from Council Bluffs, Iowa, arriving in the Salt Lake Valley in September 1850.

Foote was born in upstate New York. While he was living there in 1833 his father joined the LDS Church. Foote did not join the Church at that time but did travel with his father to Kirtland, Ohio. He later went with the Latter-day Saints to Missouri and Illinois. In 1842, Foote was baptized at Nauvoo, Illinois.

After coming to Utah Foote lived in Union in the Salt Lake valley in what is today Midvale, Utah.

In the 1860s, Foote was one of the original settlers of St. Joseph, Nevada, and an early settler of Glendale, Utah. He was a critic of the Mountain Meadows Massacre.

After moving to Glendale Foote served as a member of the Kanab Stake High Council. He was stake patriarch of the Kanab Stake at the time of his death.

Foote was a practitioner and apologist of polygamy. Foote was concurrently in two marriages with Artemisia Sidnie Myers and Eliza Maria Ivie. On March 2, 1856 at the age of 14, Ivie was sealed to Foote by Brigham Young in his office in Salt Lake City. Foote had fathered a total of 18 children with both of his wives, 12 which survived into adulthood.
