= Belknap Springs, Oregon =

Unincorporated community in the state of Oregon, United States

- Unincorporated community
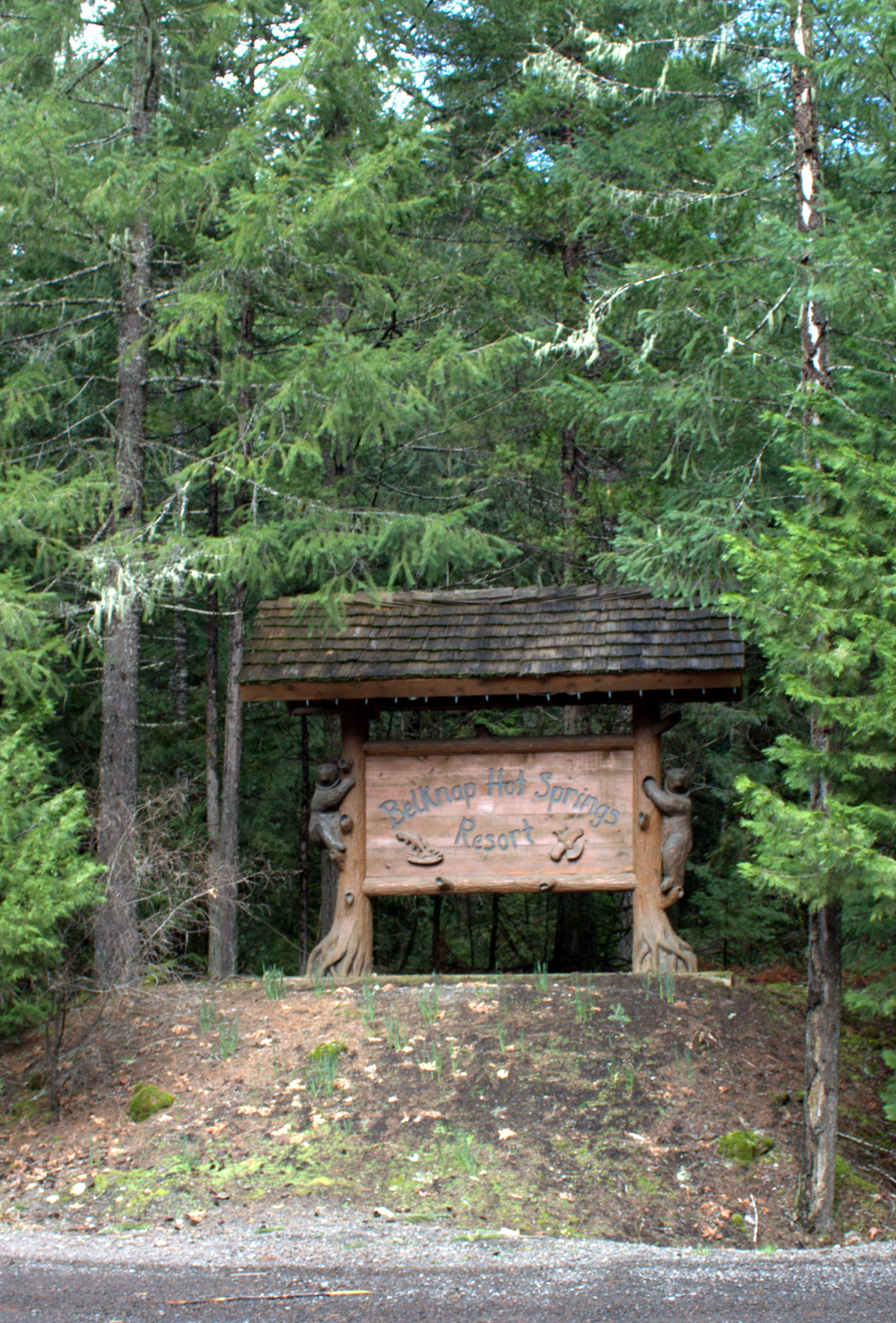
- Hot Springs sign

- Location within the state of Oregon Belknap Springs, Oregon (the United States)
- Coordinates: 44°11′25″N 122°02′57″W
- Country: United States
- State: Oregon
- County: Lane
- Established: 1875
- Founded by: Rollin Simeon Belknap
- Elevation: 1,670 ft (510 m)
- Time zone: UTC-8 (Pacific (PST))
  - Summer (DST): UTC-7 (PDT)
- ZIP code: 97413
- Area codes: 458 and 541
- GNIS feature ID: 1136054

Belknap Springs is an unincorporated community and private hot springs resort in Lane County, Oregon, United States, near the McKenzie River.

== History ==
The springs were located and initially developed by R. S. Belknap in 1869. A post office named "Salt Springs" was established in the location in 1874, and the name changed to "Belknap Springs" in 1875. The post office closed in 1877 and reopened in 1891, operating intermittently until 1953.

=== Belknap Hot Spring ===
Belknap Hot Spring itself is located across the McKenzie River from the resort at 44°11′39″N 122°3′4″W. It emerges from the source at 75 minutes per gallon at temperatures ranging from 147–198 °F (64–92 °C). The water is piped to the soaking pool facilities.

Touted as a mineral spa in the late 19th century, since then the resort site has gone through several changes of ownership and had various improvements made to it, including the addition of a hotel (currently a lodge) and cabins, forming a summer resort community. The resort has been almost continuously open to the public since the 1870s, except for a period of closure from 1968 to 1978.

== Geography ==
=== Climate ===
This region experiences warm (but not hot) and dry summers, with no average monthly temperatures above 71.6 °F (22.0 °C). According to the Köppen Climate Classification system, Belknap Springs has a warm-summer Mediterranean climate, abbreviated "Csb" on climate maps.

Climate data for Belknap Springs (1991–2020 normals, extremes 1960–present)
Month	Jan	Feb	Mar	Apr	May	Jun	Jul	Aug	Sep	Oct	Nov	Dec	Year
Record high °F (°C)	69 (21)	72 (22)	84 (29)	93 (34)	100 (38)	107 (42)	107 (42)	106 (41)	105 (41)	92 (33)	70 (21)	58 (14)	107 (42)
Mean daily maximum °F (°C)	37.1 (2.8)	42.3 (5.7)	48.2 (9.0)	55.0 (12.8)	64.6 (18.1)	72.0 (22.2)	82.5 (28.1)	82.4 (28.0)	74.8 (23.8)	59.6 (15.3)	44.3 (6.8)	36.2 (2.3)	58.3 (14.6)
Daily mean °F (°C)	33.0 (0.6)	35.8 (2.1)	39.5 (4.2)	44.8 (7.1)	52.6 (11.4)	58.7 (14.8)	66.1 (18.9)	65.8 (18.8)	59.6 (15.3)	48.8 (9.3)	38.8 (3.8)	32.9 (0.5)	48.0 (8.9)
Mean daily minimum °F (°C)	29.0 (−1.7)	29.3 (−1.5)	30.8 (−0.7)	34.5 (1.4)	40.6 (4.8)	45.5 (7.5)	49.6 (9.8)	49.2 (9.6)	44.5 (6.9)	38.1 (3.4)	33.2 (0.7)	29.6 (−1.3)	37.8 (3.2)
Record low °F (°C)	4 (−16)	4 (−16)	6 (−14)	18 (−8)	26 (−3)	31 (−1)	34 (1)	31 (−1)	28 (−2)	19 (−7)	8 (−13)	1 (−17)	1 (−17)
Average precipitation inches (mm)	10.35 (263)	7.84 (199)	7.99 (203)	6.20 (157)	4.19 (106)	2.57 (65)	0.60 (15)	0.84 (21)	2.10 (53)	6.02 (153)	10.84 (275)	12.90 (328)	72.44 (1,840)
Average snowfall inches (cm)	14.7 (37)	9.0 (23)	6.3 (16)	1.1 (2.8)	0.0 (0.0)	0.0 (0.0)	0.0 (0.0)	0.0 (0.0)	0.0 (0.0)	0.1 (0.25)	2.9 (7.4)	17.1 (43)	51.2 (130)
Average precipitation days (≥ 0.01 in)	16.6	15.3	17.5	17.2	13.9	8.7	3.2	3.5	5.9	12.7	17.7	18.1	150.3
Average snowy days (≥ 0.1 in)	4.4	3.6	2.9	0.5	0.0	0.0	0.0	0.0	0.0	0.1	1.6	5.3	18.4
Source: NOAA

== See also ==
- Belknap Bridge
- Belknap Crater
- Spa town
- List of hot springs in the United States
