= David Belnap =

American journalist

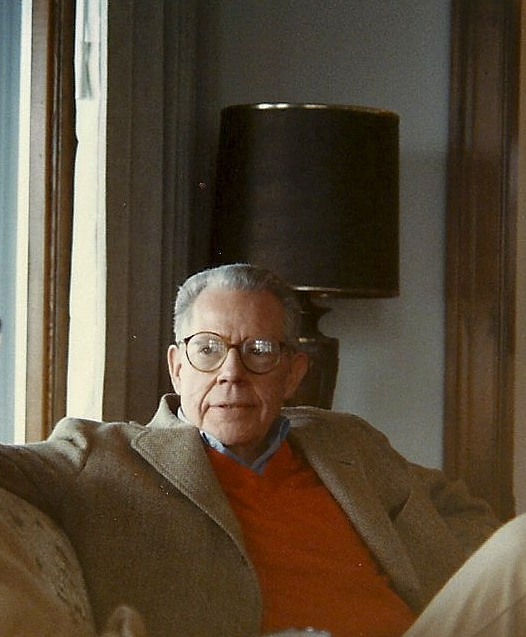
- Dave Belnap in 1979
- Born: July 27, 1922; Ogden, Utah, USA
- Died: November 8, 2009 (aged 87); Arcadia, California, USA
- Occupations: Reporter and Editor for United Press International and Los Angeles Times
- Spouse: Barbara Belnap
- Parent(s): Hyrum A. Belnap (father); Lois Ellen Foster (mother)

David Foster Belnap (July 27, 1922 – November 8, 2009) was an American journalist, foreign correspondent (1955 to 1980), director of Latin American press services for United Press International (UPI) (1962 to 1967) and Foreign Desk Editor of the Los Angeles Times (1980 to 1993). He won the 1970 Ed Stout Award of the Overseas Press Club for his series of articles on political changes in Chile and the Maria Moors Cabot Prize from Columbia University in 1973 for his Latin American coverage.

== Career ==
Belnap was born in Ogden, Utah, the oldest of five children born to Utah district judge Hyrum A. Belnap (1890–1940) and Lois Ellen Foster (1894–1985). He interned at a young age at an Ogden, Utah, newspaper and took his first paying job with United Press news service, (a Scripps company), in Salt Lake City. He relocated to Seattle in 1945 to become the Assistant City Editor for the Seattle Star, also owned by Scripps. After World War II, he moved to Helena, Montana to become UPI's bureau chief. Three years later he traded Helena for Honolulu, Hawaii, then returned to Seattle as Regional Executive for UPI in 1952.

In 1955 he received a posting as a foreign correspondent for UPI's "Chester Service" in Buenos Aires, Argentina, eventually rising to become Director of Wire Services for all of UPI's Latin America operations. In 1967 (following unrest within UPI) he transferred to the Buenos Aires bureau of the Los Angeles Times, where he remained until 1980. In that year he returned to the United States to become the Times' Foreign Desk Editor in Los Angeles. He retired in 1993 after 50 years in the business.

During his career, his major stories included Juan Peron's 1973 return to power in Argentina, the 1970 election of Socialist President Salvador Allende in Chile, the rise of rebel factions in Nicaragua and the 1 977 Jacobo Timerman scandal.

He died of heart failure November 8, 2009, in Methodist Hospital in Arcadia, California.
