= Francis M. Gibbons =

Mormon leader (1921–2016)

Second Quorum of the Seventy
- April 1, 1989 – October 5, 1991
- Called by: Ezra Taft Benson
- End reason: Honorably released

First Quorum of the Seventy
- April 6, 1986 – April 1, 1989
- Called by: Ezra Taft Benson
- End reason: Transferred to Second Quorum of the Seventy

Personal details
- Born: Francis Marion Gibbons; April 10, 1921; St. Johns, Arizona, United States
- Died: July 16, 2016 (aged 95)

Francis Marion ("Frank") Gibbons (April 10, 1921 – July 16, 2016) was the secretary to the First Presidency of the Church of Jesus Christ of Latter-day Saints (LDS Church) from 1970 to 1986 and a church general authority from 1986 until 1991.

A native of St. Johns, Arizona, Gibbons received degrees from Stanford University and the University of Utah and practiced law in Utah for eighteen years. In 1970, Gibbons was hired as the secretary to the First Presidency to replace Joseph Anderson, who had been the secretary since 1922 but who had become an Assistant to the Quorum of the Twelve Apostles.

Gibbons served as secretary to the First Presidency until March 1986, when he retired and was succeeded by F. Michael Watson. One week later, at the church's April general conference, Gibbons was called as a general authority and member of the First Quorum of the Seventy. In April 1989, he was transferred to the newly created Second Quorum of the Seventy.

In October 1991, Gibbons was honorably released from service in the Second Quorum of the Seventy and as a general authority of the church.

Gibbons also served in the church as a bishop, stake president and patriarch. He is the author of 20 books, including a biography of Jack Anderson and the hagiographical Prophets of God series about the presidents of the LDS Church.

Gibbons was married to Helen Bay and they are the parents of four children.

== Publications ==
- Gibbons, Francis M. (1977). Joseph Smith: Martyr–Prophet of God ISBN 0-87747-637-3
- —— (1979). Heber J. Grant: Man of Steel, Prophet of God ISBN 0-87747-755-8
- —— (1981). Brigham Young: Modern Moses, Prophet of God ISBN 0-87747-858-9
- —— (1982). Lorenzo Snow: Spiritual Giant, Prophet of God ISBN 0-87747-936-4
- —— (1984). Joseph F. Smith: Patriarch and Preacher, Prophet of God ISBN 0-87747-988-7
- —— (1985). John Taylor: Mormon Philosopher, Prophet of God ISBN 0-87747-714-0
- —— (1986). David O. McKay: Apostle to the World, Prophet of God ISBN 0-87579-036-4
- —— (1988). Wilford Woodruff: Wondrous Worker, Prophet of God ISBN 0-87579-115-8
- —— (1990). George Albert Smith: Kind and Caring Christian, Prophet of God ISBN 0-87579-285-5
- —— (1992). Joseph Fielding Smith: Gospel Scholar, Prophet of God ISBN 0-87579-537-4
- —— (1993). Harold B. Lee: Man of Vision, Prophet of God ISBN 0-87579-716-4
- —— (1995). Martha: A Historical Novel ISBN 0-595-32584-X
- —— (1995). Spencer W. Kimball: Resolute Disciple, Prophet of God ISBN 0-87579-994-9
- —— (1996). Ezra Taft Benson: Statesman, Patriot, Prophet of God ISBN 1-57345-148-7
- —— (1996). Dynamic Disciples, Prophets of God: Life Stories of the Presidents of The Church of Jesus Christ of Latter-day Saints ISBN 1-57345-161-4
- —— (1999). The Expanding Church: Three Decades of Remarkable Growth Among the Latter-Day Saints, 1970–1999 ISBN 0-88290-672-0
- —— and Daniel Bay Gibbons (2002). A Gathering of Eagles: Conversions from the Four Quarters of the Earth ISBN 0-595-21970-5
- —— (2003). Jack Anderson: Mormon Crusader in Gomorrah ISBN 0-595-26981-8
- —— (2005). The Spiritual Dimensions of America ISBN 0-595-34060-1
- —— (2011). Howard W. Hunter: Man of Thought and Independence, Prophet of God ISBN 1-60641-943-9
- —— (2018). Mormon Muckraker: The Life of Jack Anderson Kindle Edition ASIN B0793JQZW2
- —— (2018). Jesus Christ, Our Savior and Redeemer Kindle Edition ASIN B079J83767
