= Hooper, Utah =

City in Weber County, Utah, United States

- City
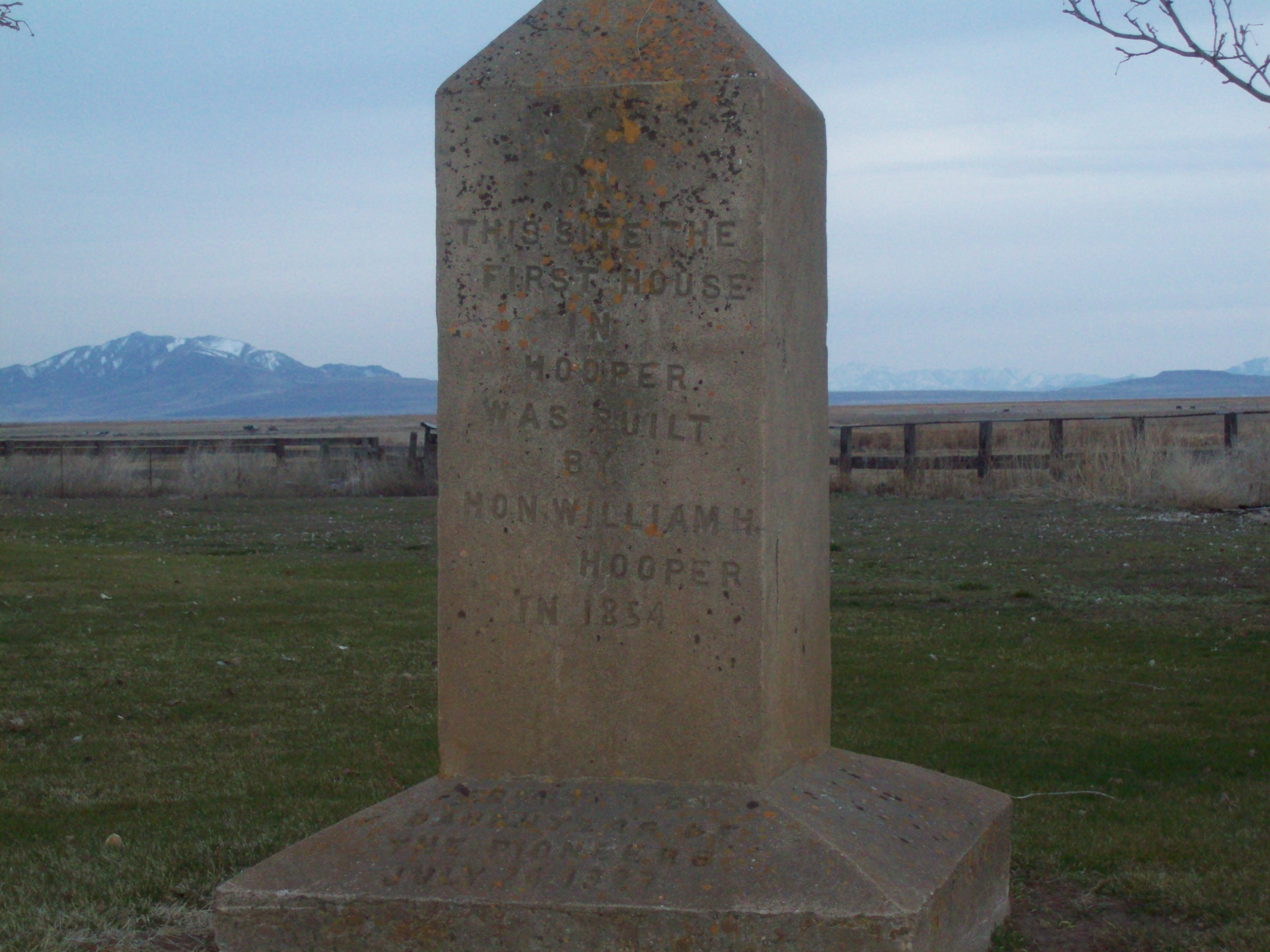
- Monument at the site of the first house built in Hooper in 1854

- Location in Weber County and the state of Utah
- Coordinates: 41°09′30″N 112°15′24″W
- Country: United States
- State: Utah
- County: Weber
- Settled: 1854
- Incorporated: November 30, 2000
- Founder: William Henry Hooper

Area
  - Total: 87.99 sq mi (227.90 km^{2})
  - Land: 26.10 sq mi (67.60 km^{2})
  - Water: 61.89 sq mi (160.30 km^{2})
- Elevation: 4,196 ft (1,279 m)

Population (2020)
  - Total: 9,087
  - Density: 348.2/sq mi (134.4/km^{2})
- Time zone: UTC-7 (MST)
  - Summer (DST): UTC-6 (MDT)
- ZIP code: 84315
- Area codes: 385, 801
- FIPS code: 49-36400
- GNIS feature ID: 2410790
- Website: www.hoopercity.gov

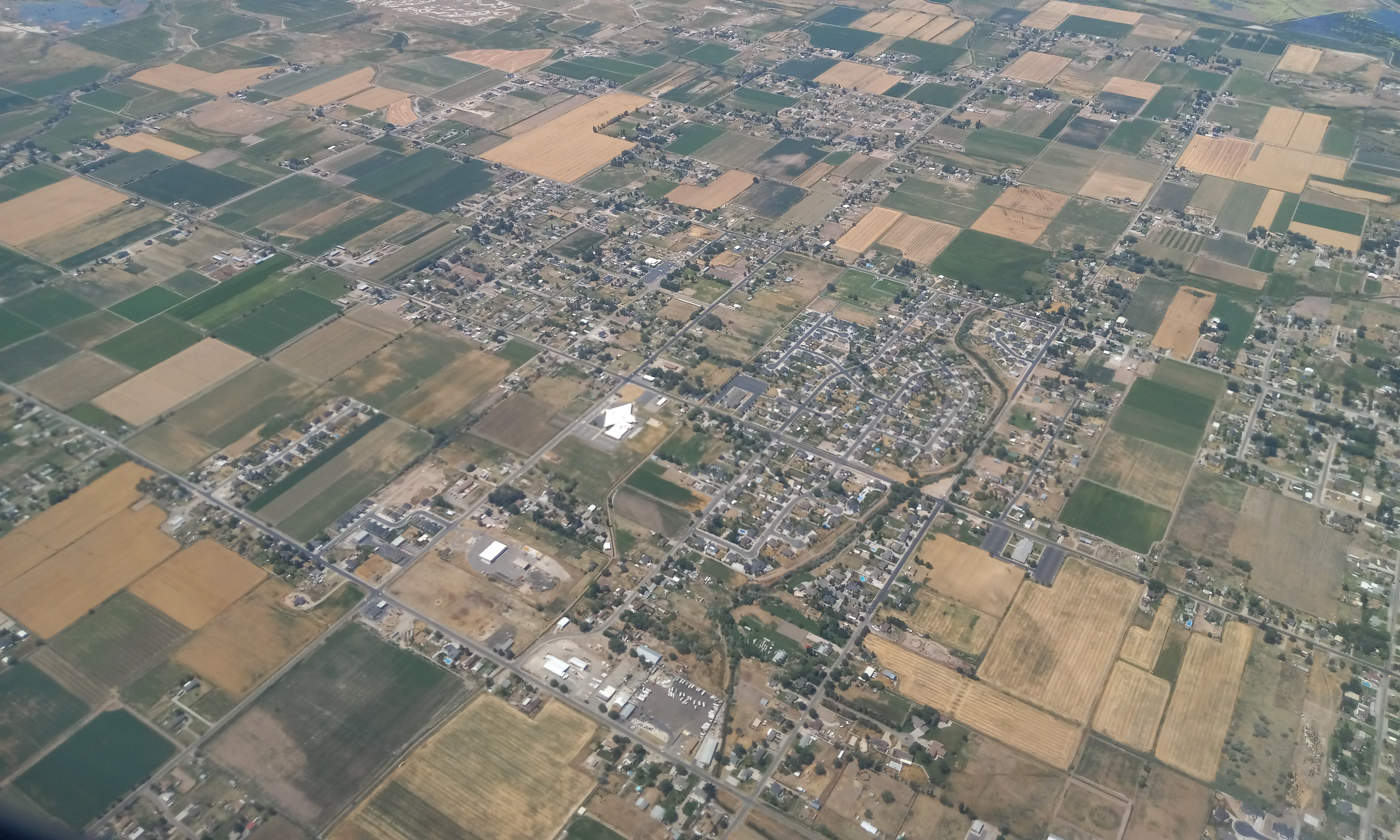
Aerial view of Hooper

Hooper (/ˈhʊpər/ HUU-pər) is a city in Weber County, Utah, United States, first called Muskrat Springs and later Hooperville for Captain William Henry Hooper, an early Utah delegate to Congress. The population was 9,087 at the 2020 census, up from the 2010 figure of 6,932. Prior to the city's incorporation on November 30, 2000, Hooper was an unincorporated census-designated place (CDP).

Hooper is part of the Ogden-Clearfield metropolitan area.

== History ==
Hooper was settled in 1854, and become a township in 1997 (about 15 years after a failed vote to incorporate). Over the next several years "it became evident that the township board could make plans and suggestions, but had no official power," so a vote to incorporate passed on May 2, 2000, with the city being officially incorporated on November 30, 2000.

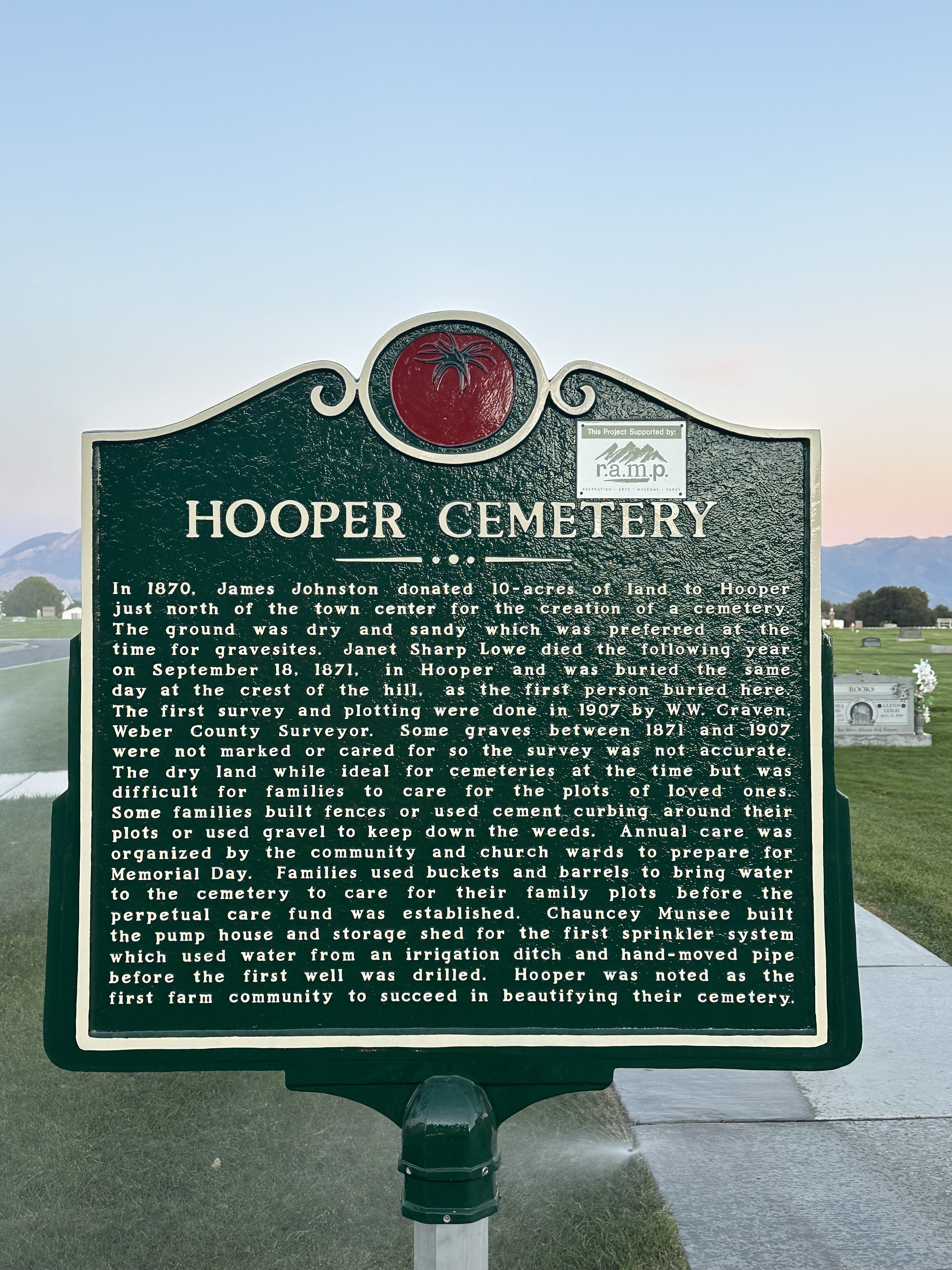
A plaque created by Hooper City describing the history of the Hooper Cemetery

== Geography ==
According to the United States Census Bureau, the CDP has a total area of 11.7 square miles (30.3 km^{2}), of which 11.5 square miles (29.9 km^{2}) is land and 0.2 square mile (0.4 km^{2}) (1.45%) is water.

Fremont Island in the Great Salt Lake is included in this city's boundary. On March 30, 2007, Glenn Barrow became the first Hooper mayor to visit the island in the city's brief history.

== Demographics ==
Historical population
Census	Pop.	Note	%±
1880	849		—
1890	778		−8.4%
1900	886		13.9%
1910	823		−7.1%
1920	859		4.4%
1930	911		6.1%
1940	1,020		12.0%
1950	1,243		21.9%
1990	3,468		—
2000	3,926		13.2%
2010	7,218		83.9%
2020	9,087		25.9%
2023 (est.)	9,369		3.1%
Source: U.S. Census Bureau

=== 2020 census ===
As of the 2020 census, Hooper had a population of 9,087 and a population density of 192.0 people per square mile (74.1/km^{2}). There were 4,633 (50.98%) males and 4,454 (49.02%) females; 2,967 (32.7%) residents were under the age of 18, 5,169 (56.9%) were from 18 to 64, and 951 (10.5%) were at least 65 years old. The median age was 33.6 years. For every 100 females there were 104.0 males, and for every 100 females age 18 and over there were 103.1 males age 18 and over.

Hooper had 2,581 households with an average size of 3.52, of which 2,275 (88.1%) were families and 306 (11.9%) were non-families; 1,289 (49.9%) of households had children under the age of 18. Among all households, 77.2% were married-couple households, 10.2% were households with a male householder and no spouse or partner present, and 9.7% were households with a female householder and no spouse or partner present. About 9.3% of all households were made up of individuals and 4.9% had someone living alone who was 65 years of age or older.

There were 2,622 housing units, of which 1.6% were vacant; the homeowner vacancy rate was 0.4% and the rental vacancy rate was 3.8%. Of occupied units, 2,453 (95.0%) were owner-occupied while 128 (5.0%) were renter-occupied.

83.8% of residents lived in urban areas, while 16.2% lived in rural areas.

Racial composition as of the 2020 census
Race	Number	Percent
White	8,166	89.9%
Black or African American	45	0.5%
American Indian and Alaska Native	46	0.5%
Asian	74	0.8%
Native Hawaiian and Other Pacific Islander	12	0.1%
Some other race	259	2.9%
Two or more races	485	5.3%
Hispanic or Latino (of any race)	719	7.9%

=== 2020 American Community Survey ===
According to the 2020 American Community Survey, the median income for a Hooper household was $100,347 and the median family income was $110,500, with a per-capita income of $33,243. The median income for males who were full-time employees was $74,708 and for females it was $46,211. 3.1% of the population and 2.6% of families were below the poverty line.

Of the 5,212 people in Hooper 25 years or older, 101 (1.9%) had not completed high school, 1,281 (24.6%) had a high school diploma or equivalency, 2,265 (43.5%) had some college or an associate degree, 1,035 (19.9%) had a bachelor's degree, and 530 (10.2%) had a graduate or professional degree.

== Government ==
The mayor of Hooper is Sheri Bingham

Hooper also has a city council that consists of five members representing six districts. Three members represent two districts each and the other two members are at large representatives.

=== Federal Representation ===
Hooper is located in Utah's First Congressional District. For the 119th United States Congress, Utah's First Congressional District is represented by Blake Moore (R).

== Attractions ==
Hooper is famously known for housing the Hooper Tomato Days, which takes place annually during the last week of August through the first week of September, including labor day weekend. With over 8,000 attendees every year, they host a variety of events to entertain the masses. Some of these events include Horse Shows, Rodeos, Pageants, Parades, Vendor Booths, Food, Fireworks and the most popular event, The Dog Race.

Historically, the Tomato Days were known to celebrate the harvest of the towns tomatoes, grown by local residents. However, over the nearly 100 years the Tomato Days have been held, the large tomato fields have become less popular. The event is now used to bring together the farming community in celebration and fun.

== See also ==
- List of cities and towns in Utah
