= Hogg Rock =

Mountain in the Cascade Range of northern Oregon

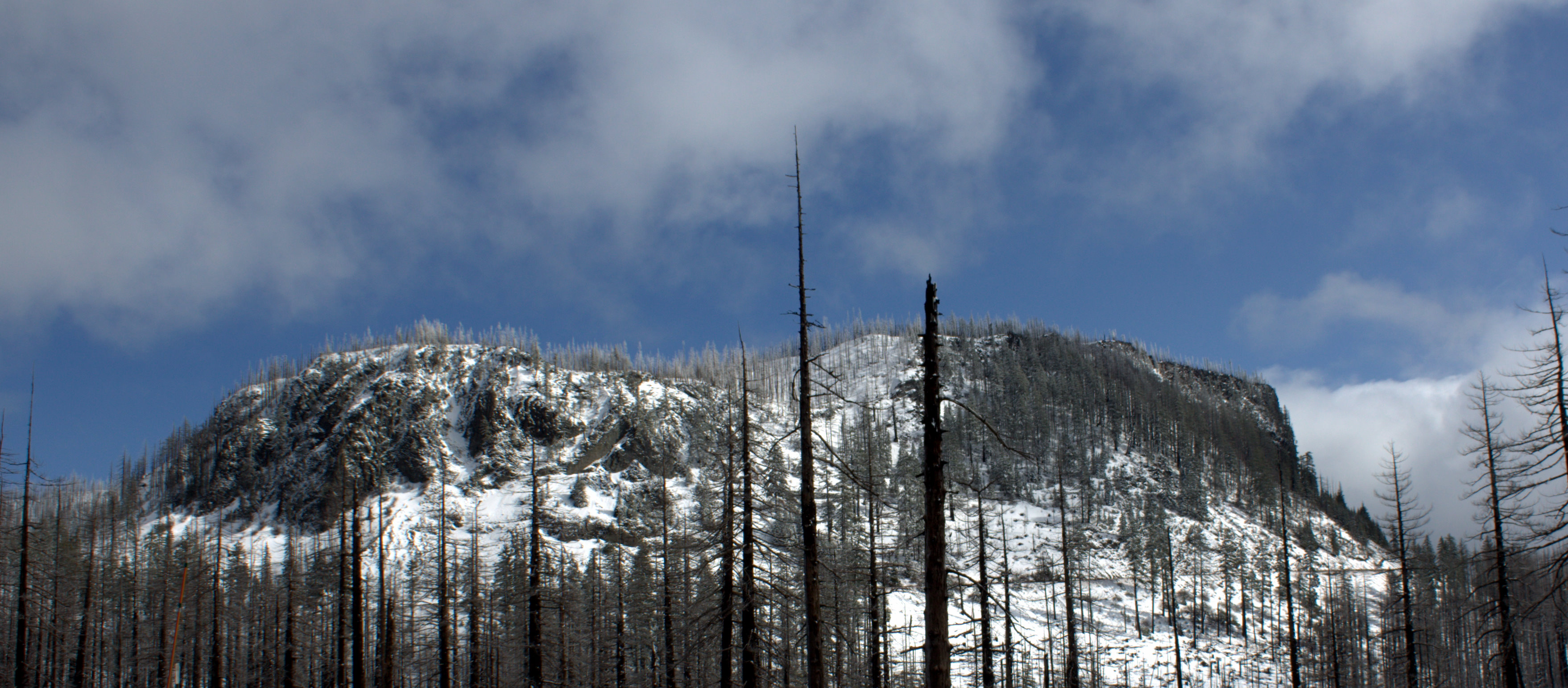

Highest point
- Elevation: 4,823 feet (1,470 m)
- Coordinates: 44°25′19″N 121°52′37″W

Geography
- Location within Oregon
- Location: Linn County, Oregon, U.S.
- Parent range: Cascades
- Topo map: USGS Three Fingered Jack

Geology
- Rock age: About 80,000 years
- Mountain type(s): Tuya, lava dome
- Last eruption: Pleistocene

Climbing
- Easiest route: Hike

Hogg Rock is a tuya volcano and lava dome in the Cascade Range of northern Oregon, United States, located close to Santiam Pass. Produced by magma with an intermediate andesite composition, it has steep slopes and thick glassy margins. Hogg Rock exhibits normal magnetic polarity and is probably about 80,000 years old.

Hogg Rock lies south of Three Fingered Jack and north of Hayrick Butte, a somewhat larger tuya of similar age and composition. A tuya is a type of subglacial volcano, formed when lava erupts underneath an overlying glacier or ice sheet and then melts through to the surface and pools, producing the flat plateau on top with near-vertical walls along the ice-contact margin as the lava cools and hardens. It is a historic landmark, with the remnants of Colonel T. Egenton Hogg's Oregon Pacific Railroad, the Santiam Lodge, and a quarry. The mountain offers snowshoe and snowmobile trails, and its summit provides views of the surrounding area including volcanoes like the Black Butte stratovolcano, Mount Washington, Sand Mountain, and Potato Hill.

== Geography ==
Hogg Rock is located in Linn County, in the U. S. state of Oregon. It is close to Santiam Pass, by the Hayrick Butte tuya, another feature produced from the interaction of volcanic eruptive materials with glaciers. It is close to the Mount Jefferson Wilderness, near where Oregon Route 22 and US Highway 20 intersect with the Cascade Range at Santiam Pass, and sits next to Oregon Route 126. Hogg Rock lies about 16 miles (25 km) north of Collier Cone, a cinder cone at the northern side of the base of the North Sister. The United States Geological Survey considers Hogg Rock part of the Three Fingered Jack quadrangle, while Siebert, Simkin, and Kimberly (2010) list it as a volcanic cone of Three Fingered Jack. Hogg Rock lies south of Three Fingered Jack and north of Hoodoo Butte and Hayrick Butte. According to the Geographic Names Information System, the volcano has an elevation of 4,823 feet (1,470 m).

== Ecology ==
The Oregon Department of Fish and Wildlife determined in the early 1990s that there was potential for peregrine falcon nests at Hogg Rock, though it was considered low-quality habitat because of its lack of suitable ledges and high amounts of human disturbance. Wildflowers and bracken ferns occur along roadways. The area has previously been affected by fires.

== Geology ==
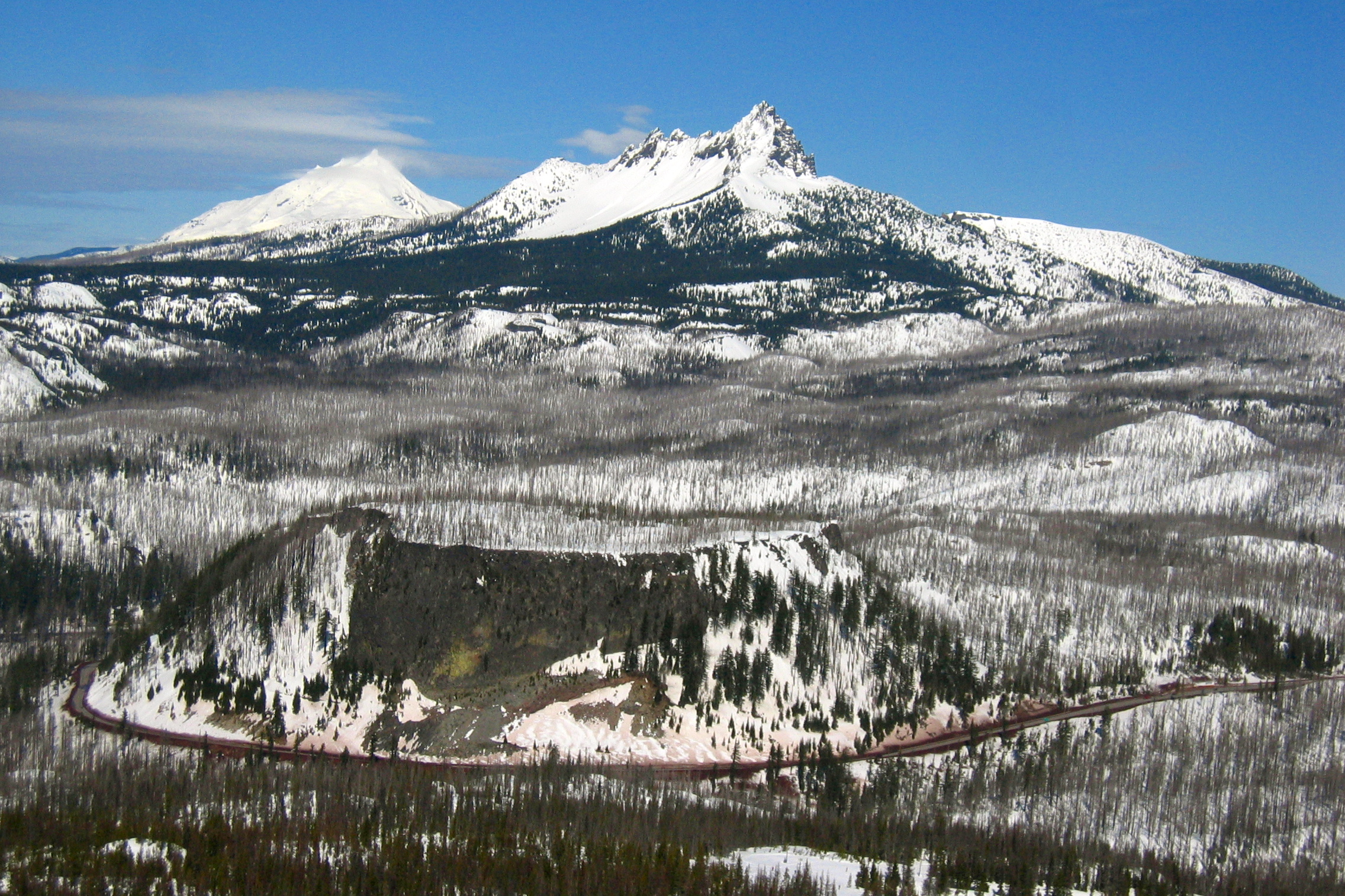
Hogg Rock, Three Fingered Jack, Mount Jefferson, and U.S. 20 near Santiam Pass

North Sister and Mount Washington mark isolated volcanic centers among the highly mafic (rich in magnesium and iron) platform of the central High Cascades. About 4.5 million years ago, eruption of mafic lava filled a subsiding Pliocene depression, creating the modern mafic edifice of the High Cascades. Compared to the eruptive products at and near North Sister, lava deposits at Mount Washington have a greater abundance of incompatible elements (elements unsuitable in size and/or charge to the cation sites of the minerals of which it is included.) Hogg Rock shows more similarity to the basaltic andesite deposits at North Sister, which are poorly enriched in incompatible elements. The part of the High Cascades that extends south from Mount Jefferson to Santiam Pass includes shield volcanoes, lava domes, and cinder cones. The high elevation of Matuyama-aged rocks east of Santiam Pass, coupled with exposure of Brunhes-aged rocks to the west, imply the presence of a northward-trending normal fault.

Part of a mostly mafic chain of volcanoes between the Three Sisters and Mount Jefferson, Hogg Rock has magma with an intermediate composition. A tuya, Hogg Rock is also considered a small lava dome with the flat top typically observed for tuya volcanoes. Unlike most lava domes in the Cascades, which are made of dacite or rhyodacite, Hogg Rock is comprised by andesitic lava. It is thick with steep sides that have glassy margins between 3.3 to 19.7 feet (1 to 6 m) in thickness,^{[a]} and the rock forming the dome is heavily jointed. Andesite forming Hogg Rock has an aphyric, only slightly porphyritic texture, with plagioclase, orthopyroxene, and olivine phenocrysts. Along with Hayrick Butte, the silica content for Hogg Rock measures about 59–60 percent.

The volcano has been eroded by glaciers. It was formed during the Pleistocene, with an approximate age of roughly 80,000 years according to Deligne et al. (2017), corresponding to the Wisconsin glacial period; Hill and Priest (1992) assign it an age of 90,000 years ± 20,000 years, while Sherrod et al. argue that its age by K–Ar dating is 80,000 years ± 20,000 years. The volcano exhibits a normal magnetic polarity.

Santiam Pass has been assessed for its geothermal energy potential, and there is a drill corehole extending to a depth of 3,040 feet (930 m) south of the highway area. In addition to the expected basaltic andesite lava and a number of dikes, the core also detected unusual basalt, andesite, and coarse sediment indicative of debris flows. The dating for these samples cannot be confirmed because of the close proximity of Brunhes-aged dikes, which likely heated nearby rock and caused the loss of radiogenic argon.

== Human history ==
Hogg Rock served as a landmark for travelers searching for Hogg Pass, which was later renamed to Santiam Pass by the United States Board on Geographic Names in 1929. This name drew from the Santiam River, its name referring to the Santiam people, who were forced to leave the area and move to the Grand Ronde reservation. Hogg Rock was named after Colonel T. Egenton Hogg, the head of the Oregon Pacific Railroad that was supposed to cross the Cascades in this location. Construction on the railroad began in the 1870s, costing Hogg about $5 million. The railway was intended by Hogg to travel from Yaquina Bay to the Snake River. Also known as the Corvallis and Eastern Railroad, it was built by Chinese and Italian workers to connect Newport and Boise, though in actuality it only extended to Idanha. Hogg ran out of money, but trying to meet the government contract stipulation that he finished crossing the Cascade Range before claiming land grants, he built 11 miles (18 km) of isolated railtracks around Hogg Rock before getting a 14-person crew to pull a boxcar on them. He then claimed the isolated tracks around the tuya were a train railway. Hogg eventually declared bankruptcy in 1890. After other businesspeople tried to pick up the railroad, it was absorbed by the Southern Pacific Transportation Company. Today, remnants of the railroad are still present at the volcano.

Santiam Pass, located at an elevation of 4,817 feet (1,468 m), marks a historic feature in the Cascade Range. West of Mount Washington and Three Fingered Jack, there are three major routes. One travels north and west down the North Santiam River, the same path followed by Hogg's railroad, while another moves southwest along the McKenzie River. The third route moves west over Tombstone Pass, reaching the South Santiam River, and was followed by the Santiam Wagon Road from 1865 to 1914 as well as the auto race of the 1905 Lewis and Clark Centennial Exposition.

In addition to the railroad, there is also a quarry at Hogg Rock and the Santiam Pass Ski Lodge building. Santiam Pass Ski Lodge, constructed by the Civilian Conservation Corps in 1939–1940, and operated for 46 years as a ski lodge with overnight dorms and later as a youth camp. In 1986 it was boarded up. It has survived major forest fires in 1968 and 2003, withstanding flames in the latter fire after firefighters swathed it in kevlar sheets. In early 2018, Willamette National Forest issued a Special Use Permit to Dwight and Susan Sheets, Friends of Santiam Pass Ski Lodge to restore the lodge and operate it year-round as a day lodge and rental venue. Funds for restoration project are from private grants and donations. The estimated timeline for the completion of the restoration is 4–5 years.

== Recreation ==
The Hoodoo ski area is located on nearby Hoodoo Butte. Hogg Rock can be reached from a snowshoe trail that starts at the Santiam Pass Sno-Park, which has restrooms and a snow play area for children. Entrance to the Sno-Park requires a permit. There is also a snowmobile trail that moves west from Santiam Lodge and then north at Hogg Rock, traveling along the remnants of Hogg's railroad. It eventually reaches the Hogg Rock summit by passing a trail left of a rock quarry at the mountain. The peak offers views of the Black Butte stratovolcano, Mount Washington, Hoodoo Butte, Sand Mountain, Three Fingered Jack, and Potato Hill. There is a viewpoint on the western slope of Hogg Rock shows forests on Potato Hill and Hoodoo Butte as well as the Hoodoo Ski Area.

== Notes ==
- [a] Dole (1968) claims that Hogg Rock and Hayrick Butte have glassy margins with thicknesses up to 50 feet (15 m).

== Sources ==
- Black, G. L.; Woller, N. M.; Ferns, M. L. (1987). Geological map of the Crescent Mountain area, Linn County, Oregon (Map). 1:62,500. Oregon Department of Geology and Mineral Industries. Geological Map Series GMS-47. Archived from the original on January 31, 2021.
- "Chapter 3: Affected Environment", Willamette National Forest (N.F.), Hoodoo Master Plan, Linn County: Environmental Impact Statement, United States Forest Service, August 1995, archived from the original on January 31, 2021.
- Conrey, R. M.; Taylor, E. M.; Donnelly-Nolan, J. M.; Sherrod, D. R. (2002), Moore, G. W. (ed.), "North-central Oregon Cascades; exploring petrologic and tectonic intimacy in a propagating intra-arc rift" (PDF), Field guide to geologic processes in Cascadia; field trips to accompany the 98th annual meeting of the Cordilleran Section of the Geological Society of America, vol. 36, Oregon Department of Geology and Mineral Industries, pp. 47–90, archived (PDF) from the original on August 27, 2017.
- Deligne, N. I.; Mckay, D.; Conrey, R. M.; Grant, G. E.; Johnson, E. R.; Sweeney, K. (2017), "Field-Trip Guide to Mafic Volcanism of the Cascade Range in Central Oregon—A Volcanic, Tectonic, Hydrologic, and Geomorphic Journey" (PDF), Scientific Investigations Report, United States Geological Survey, doi:10.3133/sir20175022H, ISSN 2328-0328, Scientific Investigations Report 2017–5022–H, archived (PDF) from the original on July 21, 2018.
- Dole, H. M., ed. (1968), Andesite Conference guidebook, Oregon Department of Geology and Mineral Industries, DOGAMI Bulletin 62, archived from the original on January 31, 2021.
- Engemann, R. H. (2009). The Oregon Companion: An Historical Gazetteer of the Useful, the Curious, and the Arcane. Timber Press. ISBN 9780881928990.
- Hildreth, W. (2007), Quaternary Magmatism in the Cascades, Geologic Perspectives, United States Geological Survey, Professional Paper 1744, archived from the original on March 25, 2019.
- Hill, B. E.; Priest, G. R. (1992), Hill, B. E. (ed.), "Geologic setting of the Santiam Pass area, central Cascade Range, Oregon", Geology and geothermal resources of the Santiam Pass area of the Oregon Cascade Range, Deschutes, Jefferson, and Linn Counties, Oregon, Oregon Department of Geology and Mineral Industries, pp. 5–18, Open-File Report O-92-3, archived from the original on January 31, 2021.
- Hughes, S. S. (1982). Petrochemical evolution of High Cascade volcanic rocks in the Three Sisters region, Oregon (Thesis). Oregon State University. Archived from the original on January 31, 2021.
- Hughes, S. S.; Taylor, E. M. (August 1986). "Geochemistry, petrogenesis, and tectonic implications of central High Cascade mafic platform lavas". GSA Bulletin. 97 (8). Geological Society of America: 1024–1036. Bibcode:1986GSAB...97.1024H. doi:10.1130/0016-7606(1986)97<1024:GPATIO>2.0.CO;2.
- Jensen, R. A.; Donnelly-Nolan, J. M.; Mckay, D. (January 2009), "A field guide to Newberry Volcano, Oregon", in O'Connor, J. E.; Dorsey, R. J.; Madin, I. P. (eds.), Volcanoes to Vineyards: Geologic Field Trips Through the Dynamic Landscape of the Pacific Northwest, Geological Society of America, pp. 53–79, doi:10.1130/2009.fld015(03), ISBN 9780813756158, Geological Society of America Field Guide 15, archived from the original on October 11, 2018.
- McArthur, L. A.; McArthur, L. L. (1992). Oregon Geographic Names (6 ed.). Portland, Oregon: Oregon Historical Society Press. ISBN 978-0875952369.
- Siebert, L.; Simkin, T.; Kimberly, P. (2010). Volcanoes of the World (3 ed.). University of California Press. ISBN 978-0520268777.
- Sherrod, D. R.; Taylor, E. M.; Ferns, M. L.; Scott, W. E.; Conrey, R. M.; Smith, G. A. (2004), Geologic Map of the Bend 30- × 60-Minute Quadrangle, Central Oregon (PDF), United States Geological Survey, Geologic Investigations Series I–2683, archived (PDF) from the original on March 25, 2019.
- Priest, G. R. (December 1983). "A field trip guide to the central Oregon Cascades" (PDF). Ore Bin. 45 (12). Oregon Department of Geology and Mineral Industries: 133–138. Archived (PDF) from the original on March 17, 2017.
- Taylor, E. M. (1981), Johnston, D. A.; Donnelly-Nolan, J. (eds.), "Road log for central High Cascade geology, Bend, Sisters, McKenzie Pass, and Santiam Pass, Oregon" (PDF), Guides to some Volcanic Terranes in Washington, Idaho, Oregon, and Northern California, United States Geological Survey, pp. 59–83, Circular 838, archived (PDF) from the original on June 21, 2020.
- Willamette National Forest (N.F.), Santiam Pass Forest Health Project, Linn County: Environmental Impact Statement, United States Forest Service, May 1995, archived from the original on January 31, 2021.
- Wood, C. A.; Kienle, J., eds. (1990). Volcanoes of North America: United States and Canada. Cambridge University Press. ISBN 978-0521438117.
