= Hoodoo (ski area) =

Ski area in Oregon, United States

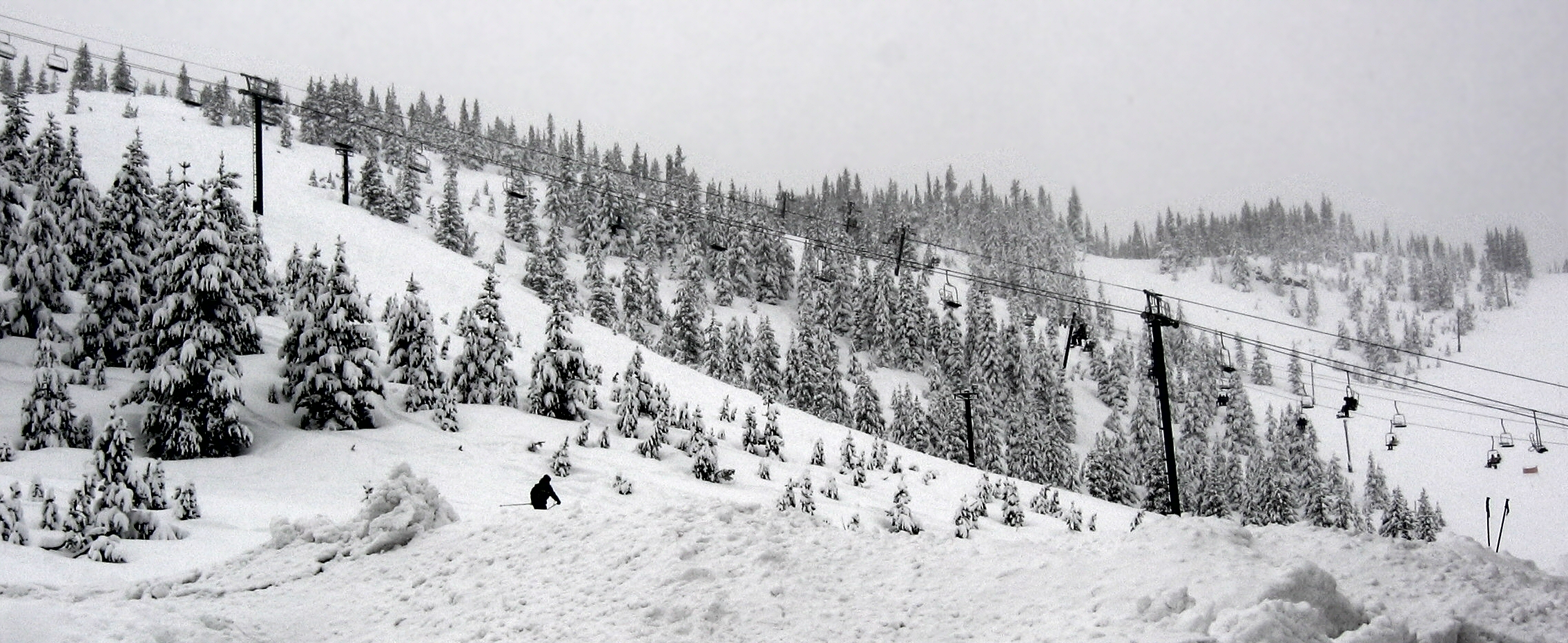
- Hoodoo Ski Area in 2006

- Location in Oregon Hoodoo (the United States)
- Location: Santiam Pass, Oregon, U.S.
- Nearest city: Salem 95 miles (150 km) northwest Eugene 80 miles (130 km), southwest Sisters 20 miles (30 km) east
- Coordinates: 44.409°N 121.872°W
- Vertical: 1,035 ft (315 m)
- Top elevation: 5,703 ft (1,738 m)
- Base elevation: 4,668 ft (1,423 m)
- Skiable area: 806 acres (3.26 km^{2})
- Trails: 32
- Longest run: 1 mile (1.6 km)
- Lift system: 3 quads, 1 triple, 1 double
- Snowfall: 360 in (30.0 ft; 9.1 m)
- Snowmaking: No
- Night skiing: Friday-Saturday
- Website: SkiHoodoo.com

Hoodoo is a ski resort in the northwest United States, in the central Cascade Range of Oregon. Located near the summit of Santiam Pass on U.S. Route 20, the ski area operates on federal land through agreement with Willamette National Forest on Hoodoo Butte, a volcanic cinder cone. Hoodoo's slopes primarily face northeast.

== History ==
The ski area was built 88 years ago in 1938, by a group funded by Ed Thurston of Bend. The group wanted to build on Three Fingered Jack but could not secure funding for a road. Following World War II, the ski area embarked on improvements, including lodging and chairlifts.

Its three-story main lodge at the base was built in the late 1940s from World War II surplus structures and included sleeping quarters for 100 guests. It was threatened by a forest fire in the summer of 1967, but was spared by the use of back fires. An antiquated chairlift, with wooden towers, was destroyed. Less than a year later and unoccupied at the time except for a family dog, the lodge was destroyed by fire in April 1968. A new two-story day lodge was constructed later in the year, and the use of pickup campers became popular at the Hoodoo parking lot. In the 1960s, the ski area was purchased by Hoodoo Ski Bowl Developers, Inc., which later built the Manzanita chair lift.

In the fall of 1985, the ski area took over the management of historic Santiam Lodge, which was built in 1940 by the Civilian Conservation Corps (CCC). Formerly operated by the United Presbyterian Church, it provided dormitory-style lodging for up to 80 guests.

In 1999, Hoodoo Ski Area was acquired by real estate developer and Umbrella Properties owner Chuck Shepard of Eugene. Since then, Hoodoo has built the Hodag chair lift, a 60,000 sq ft (5,600 m^{2}) lodge, the Autobahn Tubing Park, and replaced the green and red double chair lifts with quad chair lifts.

== Skiing ==
Hoodoo has a 60,000-square-foot (5,570 m^{2}) full service lodge. Hoodoo's flagship Green lift—a fixed grip quad chair—services the entire hill providing access to all 806 acres (3.26 km^{2}) and 1,035 feet (315 m) of vertical. Green is a 2001 replacement for the old double chair. The Ed chair, named after Hoodoo's founder, Ed Thurston, replaced the aging Red lift in 2001. The Manzanita triple chair serves the bowl, terrain park, and is open for night skiing. The Hodag lift was built in 1999 and services the backside terrain. The beginner area consists of a double chair (named Easy Rider) and is isolated from other terrain. Hoodoo also has a large selection of Nordic Skiing trails, both at high and lower altitudes.

The tube hill, called the Autobahn Tubing Park, is on the northwest flanks of Hayrick Butte. The 800-foot (240 m) long tube lanes are serviced by a handle tow.

Hoodoo offers RV camping on the south side of the parking lot.

== Stats ==
Lifts

- Green Chair - Quad chair
- Manzanita Chair (formerly known as blue) - Triple chair
- Ed Chair (formerly known as red) - Quad chair
- Hodag Chair - Quad chair
- Easy Rider - Double Chair
- None of these chairs are detachable

Runs

- Longest Run - Over Easy (from summit)
- Steepest Run - Chuck's Backside
- 34 Runs total
- 20% Easiest
- 39% Difficult
- 41% Most Difficult

== Photo gallery ==
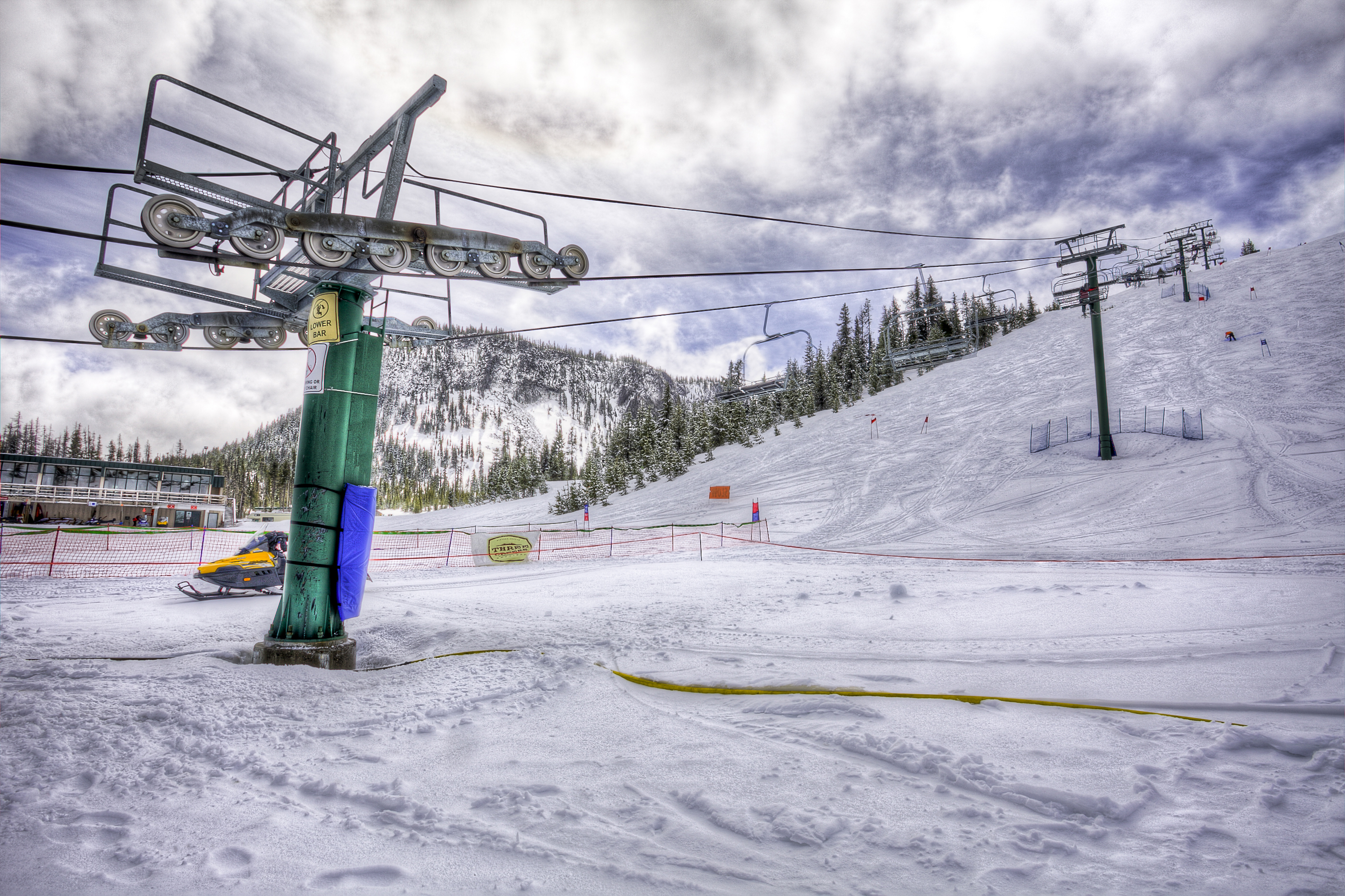
Hoodoo Ski Area's Big Green Machine chair lift takes skiers and riders from the base to the summit

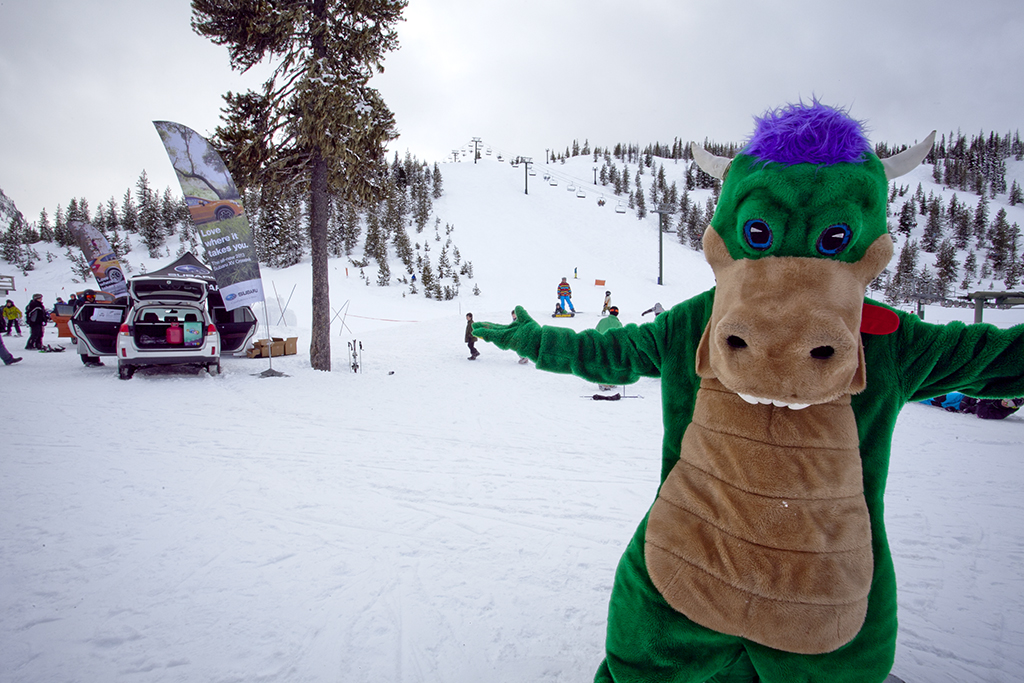
Hoodoo Ski Area's mascot, Harold the Hodag, is based on the folkloric creature from Rhinelander, Wisconsin

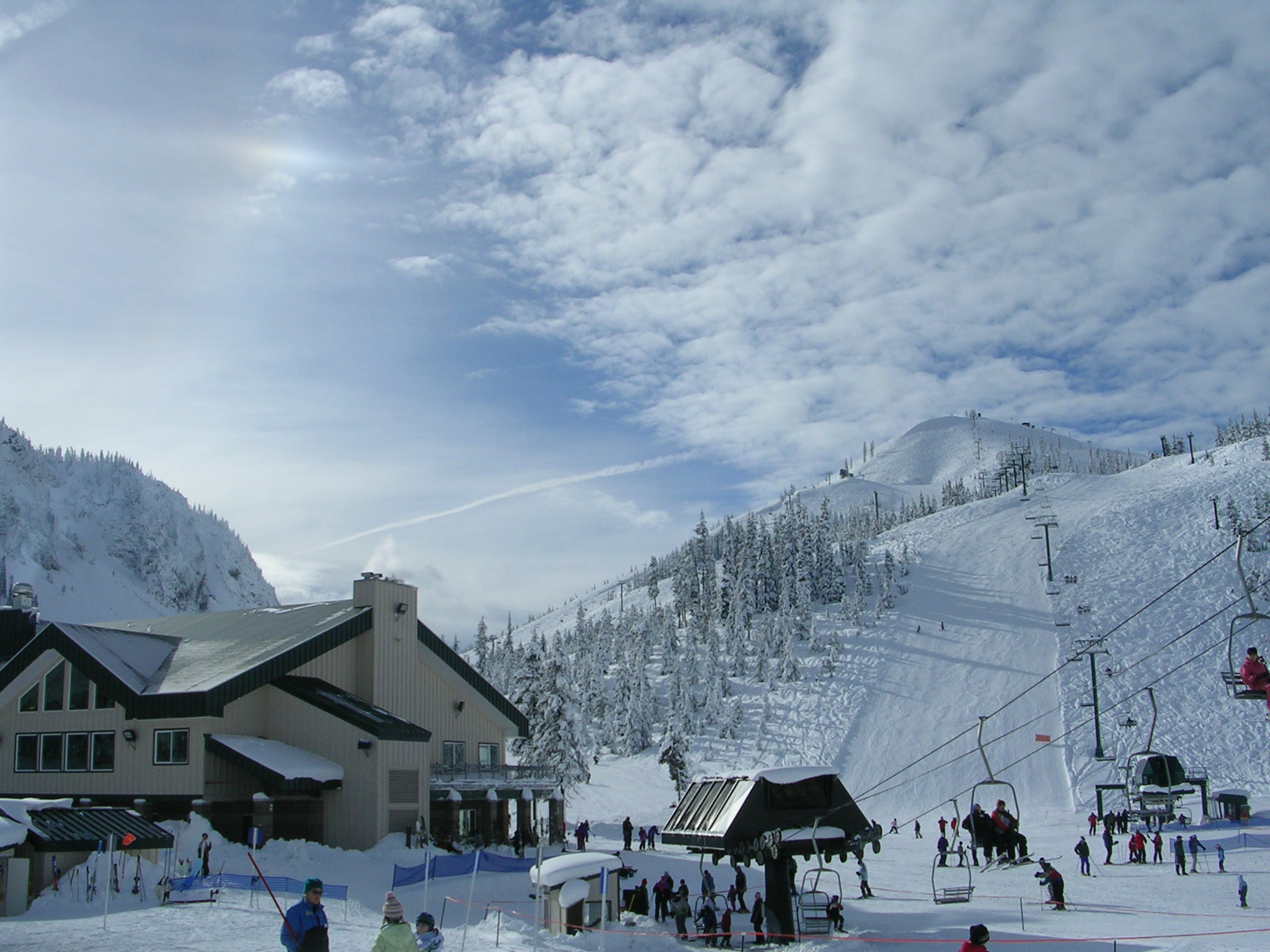
Hoodoo Ski Area's 60,000 square foot lodge includes a restaurant, full bar, powder shop, rental area, meeting rooms, arcade, daycare and locker rooms.
