= Mount Washington (Oregon) =

Deeply eroded volcano in the Cascade Range of Oregon

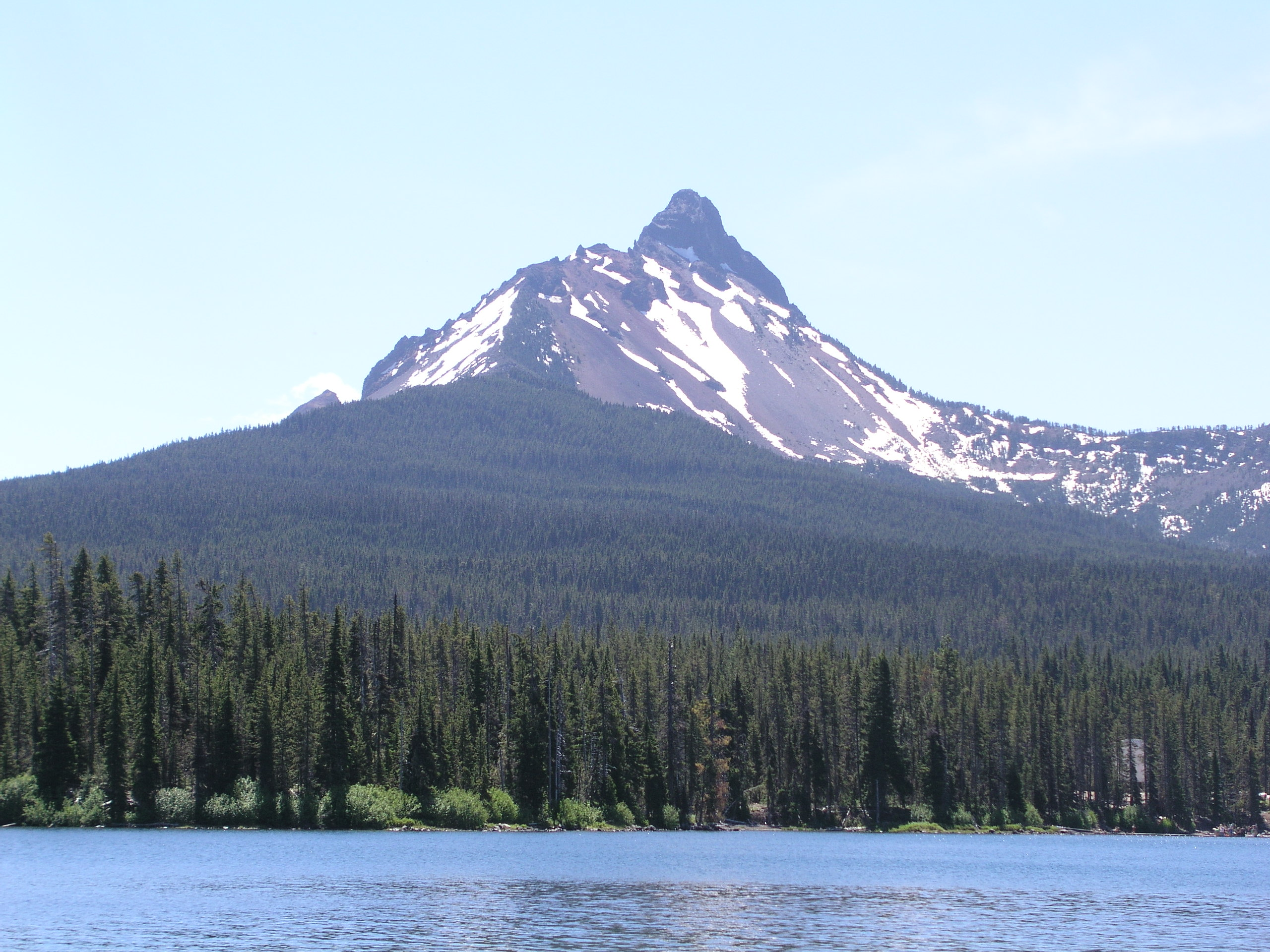
- Mount Washington as seen from Big Lake on the northwest

Highest point
- Elevation: 7,795 ft (2,376 m)
- Coordinates: 44°19′56″N 121°50′19″W

Geography
- Location within the United States
- Location: Deschutes / Linn counties, Oregon, U.S.
- Parent range: Cascade Range
- Topo map: USGS Mount Washington

Geology
- Formed by: Subduction zone volcanism
- Rock age: Pleistocene
- Mountain type(s): Shield volcano, stratovolcano, volcanic plug
- Volcanic arc: Cascade Volcanic Arc
- Last eruption: >250,000 years ago (estimated)

Climbing
- First ascent: 1923 by E. McNeal and party

Mount Washington is a deeply eroded volcano in the Cascade Range of Oregon. It lies within Deschutes and Linn counties and is surrounded by the Mount Washington Wilderness area.

Like the rest of the Oregon Cascades, Mount Washington was produced by the subduction of the oceanic Juan de Fuca tectonic plate under the continental North American tectonic plate, forming during the late Pleistocene. Made mostly of mafic (rich in magnesium and iron) volcanic rock like subalkaline basalt and basaltic andesite, it has a volcanic plug occupying its summit cone and numerous dikes. It is surrounded by other volcanic features such as cinder cones and spatter cones. The volcano's last eruptions took place from spatter cones about 1,350 years ago, generating basaltic andesite lava deposits.

Mount Washington has barren surroundings, which have seen little historical recreational use. A wagon road at McKenzie Pass was built in 1872, which was later paved during the 1930s. On August 26, 1923, the mountain was first ascended by six boys from the neighboring city of Bend. The surrounding area was designated the Mount Washington Wilderness by the federal government in 1964. The wilderness area is not heavily used, though it has a number of hiking trails. Wildlife is sparse in the region. Vegetation is mostly limited to pines and shrubs. Animal life includes deer, American black bear, cougar, various small animal species, and some fish species in the lakes.

== Geography ==
With an elevation of 7,795 feet (2,376 m) above sea level, Mount Washington is located in Deschutes and Linn counties in the U.S. state of Oregon. It lies north of McKenzie Pass, and some 12 miles (19 km) west of the city of Sisters. It is accessible by foot trails only; the western and southwestern sides of Washington intersect with the Skyline Trail about 3.1 miles (5 km) from the Big Lake trailhead near U.S. Route 20.

Despite being one of the smaller volcanic peaks in the Oregon Cascades, Mount Washington is the most prominent landmark between North Sister and Three Fingered Jack, with the Cache Mountain cinder cones to the northeast and Hayrick Butte and Hoodoo Butte to the northwest. The volcano forms a crest of steep, icy mountains with North Cinder Peak and Three Fingered Jack to the south of Mount Jefferson. The volcano has a pinnacle appearance resembling the spire-like shape of Mount Thielsen. According to Harris (2005), the volcano resembles Cleopatra's Needle from certain angles and the Sugarloaf Mountain in Brazil from others. The proximal relief for the volcano is 2,707 feet (825 m), while the draping relief is 3,363 feet (1,025 m).^{[a]} The volcano has an overall volume of 3.6 cubic miles (15 km^{3}).

=== Physical geography ===
Elevations in the Mount Washington area range from 3,200 feet (980 m) to greater than 7,700 feet (2,300 m). Most precipitation falls during the winter as snow, and summers are warm and dry. During the winter season, the Cascades are typically covered with a deep snowpack. Oregon Route 242 over McKenzie Pass is closed from fall through late spring, whereas the Santiam Highway and Oregon Route 126 are maintained and remain open year-round.

The Mount Washington Wilderness includes glacial landforms – specifically outwash plains and lateral, recessional, and terminal ground moraines. Many of these glacial deposits were created from the most recent glacial advance in the late Pleistocene, when there was an ice sheet between Mount Washington and Three Fingered Jack, although there are Holocene glacial deposits as well. The McKenzie River, fed by Clear Lake, runs south for about 15 miles (24 km) just west of Mount Washington before it turns west for another 70 miles (110 km) and meets the Willamette River near the city of Eugene.

== Wilderness ==
The Mount Washington Wilderness covers an area of 54,278 acres (219.66 km^{2}). First named a wild area by the United States Forest Service in 1975, it was designated as one of the original wilderness areas under the 1964 Wilderness Act. Located 32 miles (51 km) to the west of Bend, the Mount Washington plot is the smallest of three wilderness areas that encompass most of the High Cascades, a physiographic region located in the central part of Oregon; the two others are the Three Sisters Wilderness and Mount Jefferson Wilderness. Used mostly by hunters, hikers, and climbers, the Mount Washington area includes the Dee Wright Observatory, smaller volcanoes, and parts of the Pacific Crest Trail, which runs north–south through the wilderness for about 16.6 miles (26.7 km). Other major features include Belknap Crater and 28 lakes. The wilderness area is jointly administered by authorities for the Willamette National Forest and Deschutes National Forest.

=== Mineral and geothermal potential ===
A mineral survey from 1980 through 1981 detected little potential for metallic mineral or fossil fuel resources in the Mount Washington Wilderness. The area contains large amounts of cinder – more than 200,000,000 cubic yards (0.15 km^{3}) – but there are alternate sources in the region, which are sufficient to meet local demands. Likewise, there are no mines in the area, nor any documented history of mining claims; the closest mines are located 20 miles (32 km) to the west in the Blue River mining district. The volcanic vents throughout the Mount Washington Wilderness are underlain by Eocene to Pliocene volcanic rock layers, which do not contain hydrocarbons for fossil fuels. While there is relatively little potential for geothermal energy in the High Cascades, there are hot springs along the western edge of the mountain range. The Belknap Hot Spring lies 4 miles (6.4 km) to the southwest of the wilderness area, ejecting water at a rate of 75 U.S. gallons (280 L) per minute with a temperature of 180 °F (82 °C).

== Ecology ==
Described by Wuerthner (2003) as a "rocks and ice wilderness," much of the Mount Washington Wilderness consists of lava flows and rubble. However, it does include some forested areas, as well as 28 lakes in the northern and southwestern parts of the space. Vegetation in the area includes mountain hemlock, lodgepole pine, ponderosa pine, and whitebark pine. Ponderosa pine occurs at the eastern base of the volcano, with Douglas fir on the western side. Vegetation is sparse on lava-covered surfaces. Mountain hemlock, however, also grows on lava flows, and there is an understory of beargrass, huckleberry, and rhododendron. Animal life includes large animals such as deer and elk, with the rare American black bear or cougar. Smaller animals like pikas, marmots, martens, snowshoe hares, and ground squirrels are also found in the area. Lakes in the wilderness sustain populations of brook trout, cutthroat trout, and rainbow trout, and frogs can be observed around some of them.

== Human history ==
The barrenness of Mount Washington's surroundings means that it has seen little historical recreational use. A wagon road at McKenzie Pass was built in 1872, which was later paved during the 1930s and became Oregon Route 242. It received its name from the nearby McKenzie River, which in turn derived its name from Donald McKenzie, a fur trader who explored the area in 1812. On August 26, 1923, Mount Washington was climbed for the first time by six boys from Bend: Ervin McNeal, Phil Philbrook, Armin Furrer, Wilbur Watkins, Leo Harryman, and Ronald Sellars.

Before Mount Washington's surroundings were designated a wilderness area in 1964, the Willamette National Forest administration had planned to open them to commercial timber production to address a shortage in Lane County, asserting that the land had little aesthetic or recreational merit. The area was established anyway, as Forest Service agents argued it would improve "wilderness".

== Geology ==
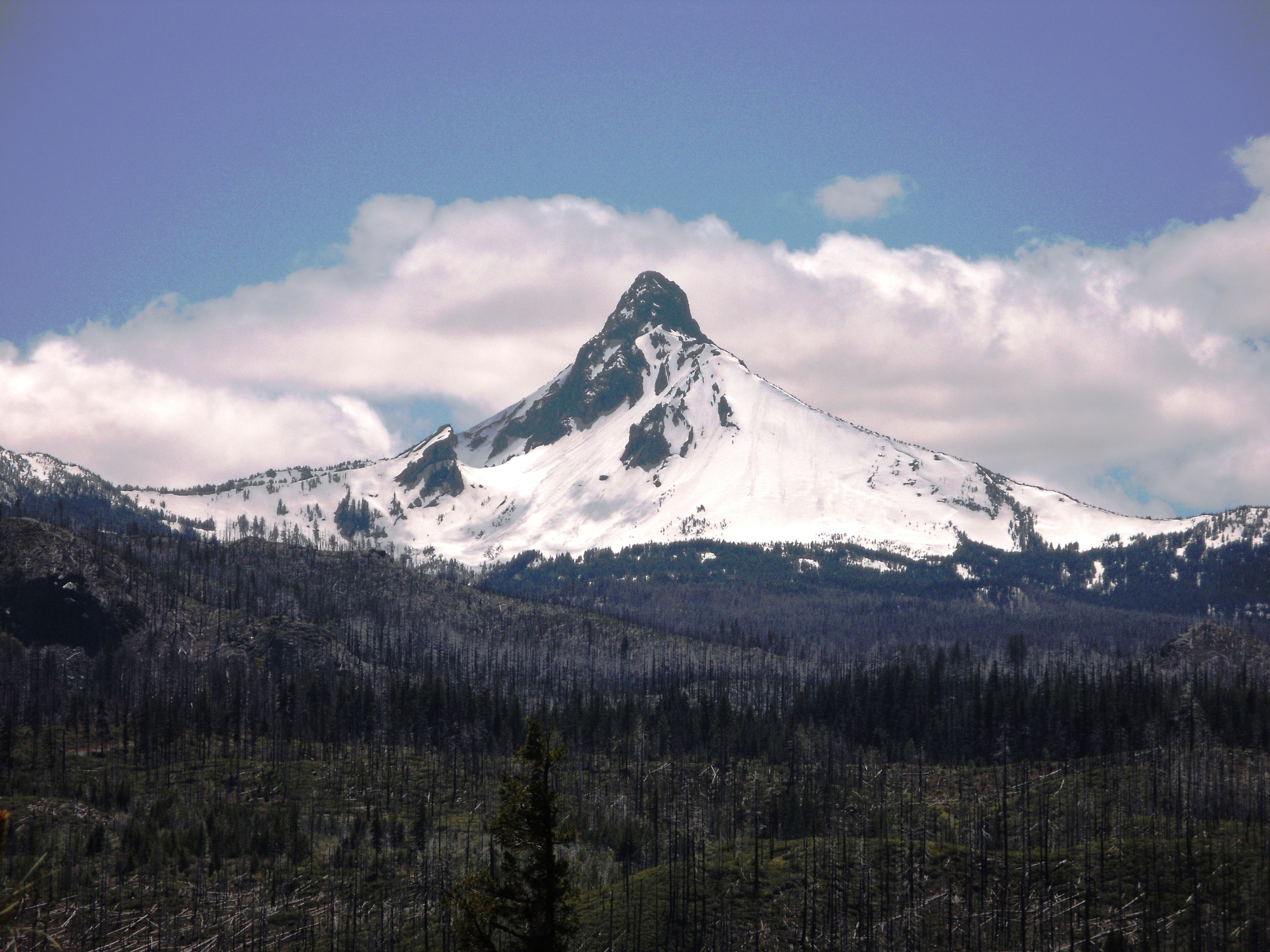
The spire-like appearance of Mount Washington

Volcanism in the Oregon segment of the Cascade Range results from intra-range rifts and the subduction of the Juan de Fuca tectonic plate under the North American tectonic plate. Mount Washington forms part of the High Cascades physiographic region in central Oregon, an arc of Pliocene to Quaternary lava flows, cinder cones, and fissure vents that trend from north to south, with occasional large stratovolcanoes. Near Mount Washington, the High Cascades form a lava field with high-alumina, diktytaxitic basalt erupted from cinder cones. These volcanoes have been eroded by glaciers and reduced to buttes in the Cascade arc, and much of the vents in the area were covered by Mount Washington. Some basalt lava flows occur on the edges of Mount Washington at the Cache Creek and Dry Creek canyons or as outcrops that form benches (long, relatively narrow strips of relatively level or gently inclined land bounded by distinctly steeper slopes above and below) about 9.9 miles (16 km) away from Washington from Patjens Lake to the McKenzie River.

Washington is part of the informal group of volcanoes known as Oregon's Matterhorns, which includes Mount Thielsen, Three Fingered Jack, Mount Bailey, and Diamond Peak. The name originates from the spire-like appearance of the volcanoes' summits, which resembles the pinnacle of the Matterhorn in Switzerland. They all ceased eruptive activity at least 100,000 to 250,000 years ago, leading to their extensive dissection by glaciers over time. Mount Washington is also part of the Sisters Reach subsegment, which extends for 56 miles (90 km) and contains at least 466 volcanoes that were active during the Quaternary. Washington represents one of 30 mafic (rich in magnesium and iron) stratovolcanoes and shield volcanoes in the group, which include Pleistocene and Holocene eruptive centers. The volcano and its wilderness area sit on a lava platform with an altitude of 4,000 to 5,000 feet (1,200 to 1,500 m), and they are bounded by faults to the east and west. Volcanic rocks contained within the wilderness area are either composed of older basalt or younger basaltic andesite, all of which were produced during the Quaternary, probably during the past 700,000 years. Pleistocene deposits show evidence of erosion by glaciers. Holocene deposits, dated between 3,000 and 1,500 years old, encompass about half of the wilderness area, and they also occur outside the wilderness area at its northwestern and southern borders.

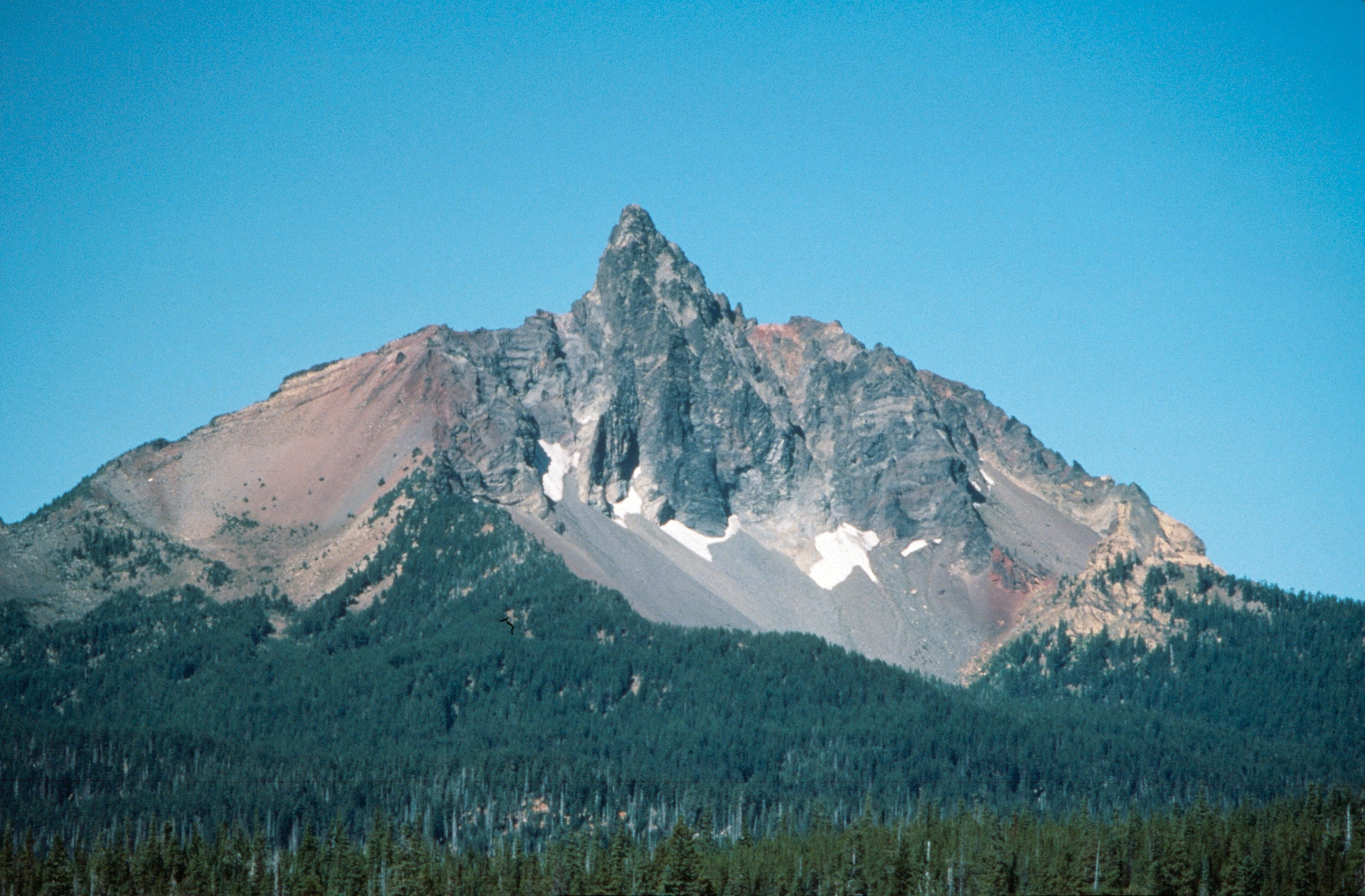
The deeply eroded Mount Washington seen from the east

Whether Mount Washington is a stratovolcano or shield volcano is debated within the literature. Wood and Kienle (1990) refer to it as a "mafic shield volcano," and the Global Volcanism Program of the Smithsonian Institution also considers it a shield volcano with a pyroclastic cone. Sherrod et al. (2004) classify Mount Washington as a "steep-sided" shield volcano. E. M. Taylor describes Mount Washington as a stratovolcano cone that reaches an elevation of 4,000 feet (1,200 m) above an older shield volcano, referring to it as "a glacially-gutted Pleistocene stratovolcano." Hildreth (2007) likewise calls it a "a glacially sculpted mafic stratocone [...] with a broad apron of mafic lavas." In his argument for classifying Mount Washington as a stratovolcano, Hildreth adds that it is made of composite materials with steep slopes and a high relief of 2,300 to 4,300 feet (700 to 1,300 m). However, Hildreth acknowledges that there is morphological continuity from steep mafic cones into transitional, cone-shaped shield volcanoes like Olallie Butte.

Mount Washington has a diameter of about 3 miles (4.8 km). It has a summit cone, a volcanic plug comprised by cinder, lava flows, and intrusive rock that covers Washington's volcanic conduit. This plug is made of micronorite with a diameter of 0.25 miles (0.4 km). There are dikes exposed throughout the summit cone, mostly oriented from north to south, with another dike swarm trending north from the central plug. The summit formed over a platform of basaltic andesite lavas from early eruptions at Mount Washington, made of thinner flows combined with pyroclastic rock.

The volcano has a mafic composition, with subalkaline basalt and basaltic andesite. Lava flows from Washington exhibit breccia with plagioclase and olivine, with palagonite tuff at the northeastern slope of the mountain that might indicate a past subglacial eruption during Washington's cone-building phase.

Mount Washington has been eroded over time and is now very dissected, with its inner contents exposed and U-shaped canyons and cirques. In the late Pleistocene, large glaciers extending more than 7.5 miles (12 km) to the east and west carved cirques into the slopes of the volcano. The George Lake and Dry Creek cirques, which face north and northeast, respectively, show evidence of holding glaciers similar to those documented at Canyon Creek cirque on Three Fingered Jack with moraines. Wood and Kienle (1990) estimate that Mount Washington once extended to an elevation of 8,500 feet (2,600 m), with an elevation of 3,900 feet (1,200 m) above the basalt lava field surrounding it.

=== Subfeatures ===
The Global Volcanism Program considers Cache Mountain, Little Cache Mountain, Hayrick Butte, and Hoodoo Butte subsidiary cones of Mount Washington. The Mount Washington Wilderness includes a number of cinder cones, typically with elevations between 150 and 300 feet (46 and 91 m). Composed of gray to red cinder, they also have scoria and welded spatter. Major cinder cones in the wilderness include Belknap Crater, Twin Craters, Scott Mountain, and the Sand Mountain craters.

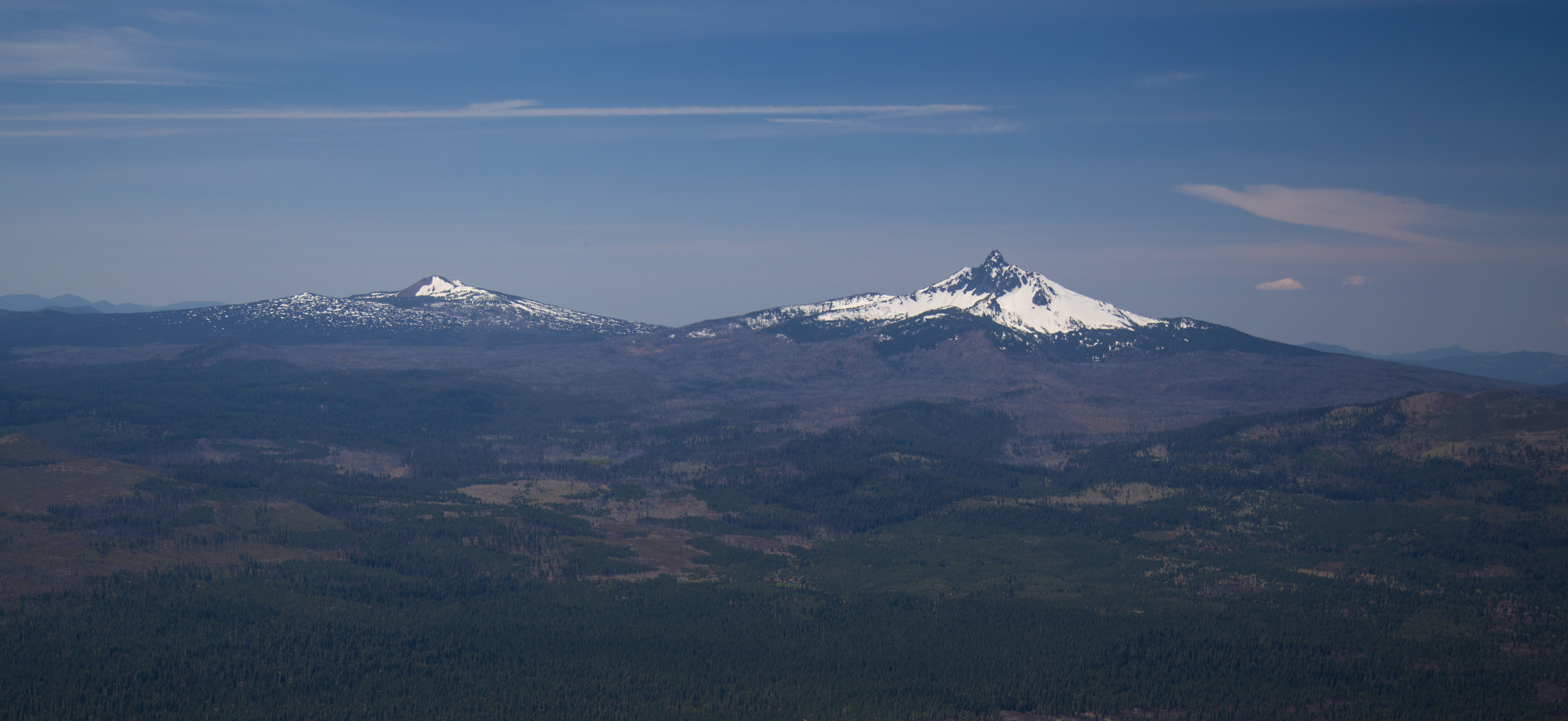
Mount Washington with Belknap Crater on the left

Eruptions from a chain of spatter cones mark the most recent activity at Mount Washington. About one mile in length, they trend northeast, with their mid-section parallel to depressions in the Cache Creek valley between Mount Washington and Blue Lake Crater. The northernmost vent of Mount Washington has a depth of 10 feet (3.0 m) and likely only ever erupted volcanic gas. The first group of four spatter cones lies 200 feet (61 m) to the south, with depths ranging from 30 to 40 feet (9.1 to 12.2 m). Farther south, there are seven other vents, including three small craters separated from three larger vents to the south by a graben, as well as a central crater with a small crater on the northern side of its rim.

=== Mount Washington basaltic andesite ===
There are four major types of basalt and basaltic andesite in the central Cascades: early high-alumina olivine tholeiitic (HAOT) basalt, normal High Cascade HAOT basalt, North Sister basaltic andesites, and Mount Washington type basaltic andesites. Hughes (1990) argues that their differences could be the result of different magma sources or magma evolution in open systems. Mount Washington basaltic andesites are also considered one of the three distinct mafic rock types in the High Cascade platform, with North Sister basaltic andesites and normal basalts. The three groups all exhibit different major and trace element abundances. Mount Washington basaltic andesite is more common than North Sister basaltic andesite, with higher levels of incompatible elements and rare-earth elements. It also extends to the east and west of the major Cascade arc. Otherwise, the Mount Washington and North Sister basaltic andesites display lithologic similarities including a dearth of pyroxene phenocrysts and augite microphenocrysts, and both groups were probably near-primary melts. According to Hughes (1982), examples of Mount Washington basaltic andesites occur at Holocene deposits from Nash Crater, Four-in-One Cone, and Little Belknap Cone, as well as undated deposits at Todd Lake Volcano, Falls Creek, Broken Top, and the abutment of Tumalo Dam.

== Eruptive history ==
Mount Washington formed during the late Pleistocene epoch; the volcano itself is not older than a few hundred thousand years. Harris (2005) estimates that it has not erupted for more than 250,000 years, similar to Mount Thielsen; this date is supported by James, Manga, and Rose (1999). Paleomagnetic evidence suggests that the volcano and associated lava flows exhibit normal magnetic polarity. Its volcanic edifice was produced through the eruption of basaltic andesite and mafic volcanic ash, the latter being preserved as palagonite tuff along the northeastern and southwestern flanks of the summit cone.

Compared to larger stratovolcanoes in the Cascade volcanic arc, Mount Washington, like the rest of Oregon's Matterhorns, had a relatively short eruptive life. Several spatter cones produced basaltic andesite on the lower northeastern side of the volcano, following a fissure that reached 2.5 miles (4 km) from Washington's summit. There were no lava flows from this eruption, nor at an eruption at the nearby Blue Lake Crater, which produced volcanic material that displayed petrographic similarities to the Mount Washington splatter cone deposits. These include similar porphyritic textures with 10 to 15 percent plagioclase phenocrysts as well as similar alignments, suggesting that they erupted simultaneously. Sherrod et al. (2004) argue that the spatter cones and activity from Blue Lake Crater represent the most recent eruptions near the McKenzie Pass and Santiam Pass region.

It is still possible that new volcanic cones could be produced at the base of Mount Washington. However, according to Taylor, Causey, and MacLeod (1983), the volcano itself is unlikely to still be active.

== Recreation ==
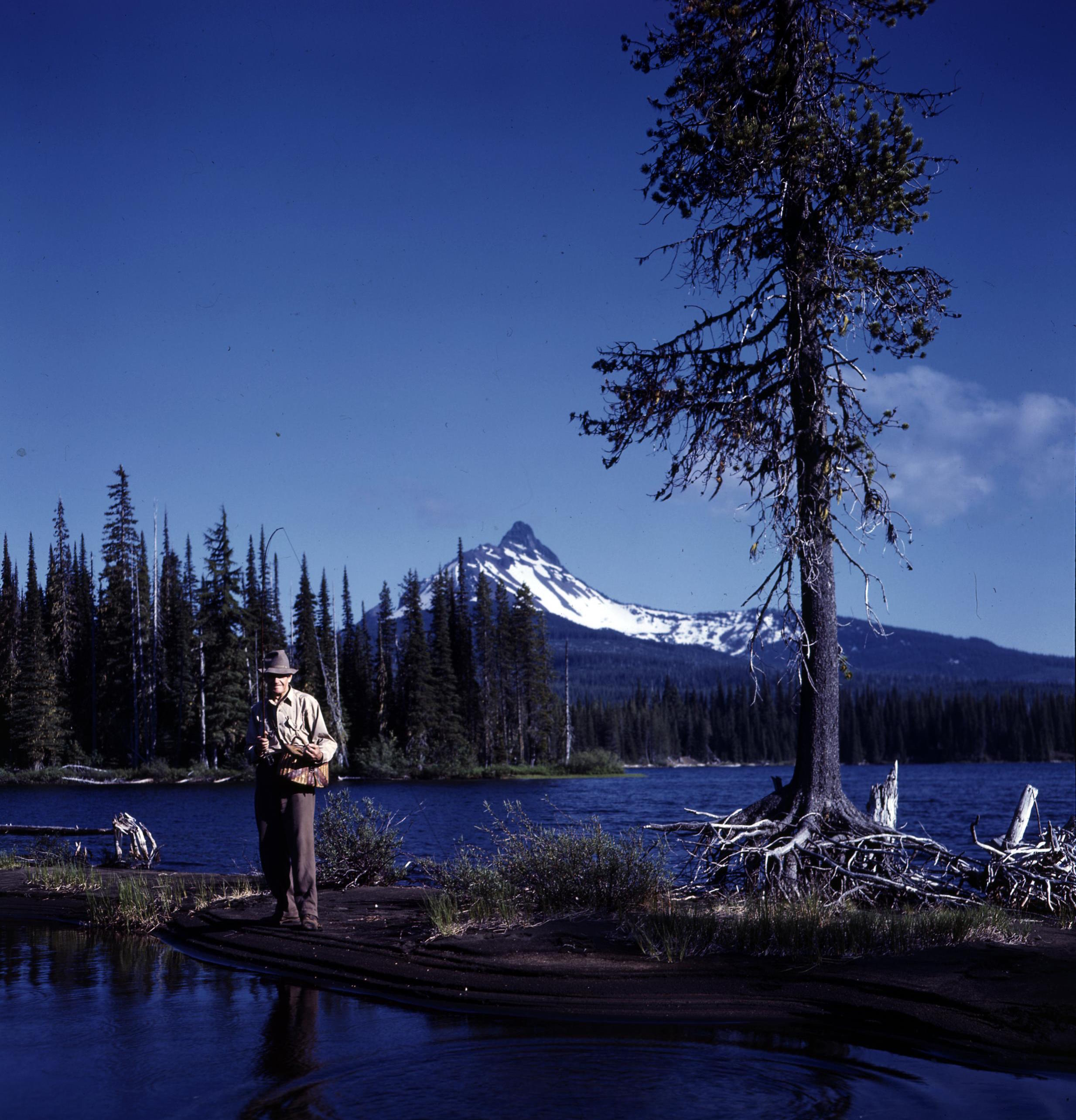
Fisherman at Big Lake with Mount Washington in the background

While the area is not used as frequently as many other wilderness areas in the Oregon branch of the Cascade Range, it offers scenic lakes and trails. The Pacific Crest Trail passes over the western side of Mount Washington. Other trails include a loop around the Patjens Lakes, the Hand Lake trail, and the Benson Lake route. The U.S. National Geodetic Survey Data Sheet for Mount Washington notes that climbing the volcano is challenging and dangerous and thus is not recommended for inexperienced climbers or climbers without proper equipment.

== Notes ==
- [a] According to Hildreth's definitions, proximal relief refers to the difference between the summit elevation and the highest exposure of old rocks under the main edifice, while draping relief marks the difference between the summit elevation and the edifice's lowest distal lava flows (excluding pyroclastic and debris flows).

== Sources ==
- Christensen, N. A.; Cole, D. N. (2000), Cole, D. N.; McCool, S. F.; Borrie, W. T.; O'Loughlin, J. (eds.), "Leave no trace practices: behaviors and preferences of wilderness visitors regarding use of cookstoves and camping away from lakes", Wilderness science in a time of change conference, vol. 4, United States Forest Service Rocky Mountain Research Station, pp. 77–85, archived from the original on 2018-11-15.
- Harris, S. L. (2005). Fire Mountains of the West: The Cascade and Mono Lake Volcanoes (3rd ed.). Mountain Press Publishing Company. ISBN 978-0878425112.
- Hildreth, W. (2007), Quaternary Magmatism in the Cascades—Geologic Perspectives (PDF), United States Geological Survey, doi:10.3133/wri884110, Professional Paper 1744, archived (PDF) from the original on 2021-01-31.
- Hughes, S. S. (1982). Petrochemical evolution of High Cascade volcanic rocks in the Three Sisters region, Oregon (Thesis). Oregon State University. Archived from the original on 2021-01-31.
- Hughes, S. S. (November 1990). "Mafic magmatism and associated tectonism of the Central High Cascade Range, Oregon". Journal of Geophysical Research. 95 (B12). American Geophysical Union: 19623–19638. Bibcode:1990JGR....9519623H. doi:10.1029/JB095iB12p19623.
- Hughes, S. S.; Taylor, E. M. (August 1986). "Geochemistry, petrogenesis, and tectonic implications of central High Cascade mafic platform lavas". GSA Bulletin. 97 (8). Geological Society of America: 1024–1036. Bibcode:1986GSAB...97.1024H. doi:10.1130/0016-7606(1986)97<1024:GPATIO>2.0.CO;2.
- James, E. R.; Manga, M.; Rose, T. P. (September 1999). "CO_{2} degassing in the Oregon Cascades". Geology. 27 (9). Geological Society of America: 823–826. Bibcode:1999Geo....27..823J. doi:10.1130/0091-7613(1999)027<0823:CDITOC>2.3.CO;2.
- Keach, R. W.; Oliver, J. E.; Brown, L. D.; Kaufman, S. (June 1989). "Cenozoic active margin and shallow Cascades structure: COCORP results from western Oregon". GSA Bulletin. 101 (6). Geological Society of America: 783–794. Bibcode:1989GSAB..101..783K. doi:10.1130/0016-7606(1989)101<0783:CAMASC>2.3.CO;2.
- Marsh, K. R. (2002). ""This Is Just the First Round": Designating Wilderness in the Central Oregon Cascades, 1950-1964". Oregon Historical Quarterly. 103 (2). Oregon Historical Society: 210–233. JSTOR 20615230.
- Schmidt, M. E.; Grunder, A. L. (May 2009). "The evolution of North Sister: A volcano shaped by extension and ice in the central Oregon Cascade Arc". GSA Bulletin. 121 (5–6). Geological Society of America: 643–662. Bibcode:2009GSAB..121..643S. doi:10.1130/B26442.1.
- Scott, W. E. (January 1, 1977). "Quaternary glaciation and volcanism, Metolius River area, Oregon". Geological Society of America Bulletin. 88 (1). Geological Society of America: 113–124. Bibcode:1977GSAB...88..113S. doi:10.1130/0016-7606(1977)88<113:QGAVMR>2.0.CO;2.
- Sellars, R. (December 1923). "The Conquest of Mount Washington". Mazama. 6 (4). Portland: Mazamas: 69–75. Archived from the original on 2021-01-31.
- Sherrod, D. R.; Taylor, E. M.; Ferns, M. L.; Scott, W. E.; Conrey, R. M.; Smith, G. A. (2004), Geologic Map of the Bend 30-×60-Minute Quadrangle, Central Oregon (PDF), Geologic Investigations Series I–2683, archived (PDF) from the original on 2012-02-01.
- Stearns, H. T. (1929), Geology and water resources of the Upper McKenzie Valley, Oregon, United States Government Publishing Office, doi:10.3133/wsp597D, Water Supply Paper 597- D, archived from the original on 2018-11-15.
- Taylor, E. M. (1981), "Guides to Some Volcanic Terranes in Washington, Idaho, Oregon, and Northern California", in Johnston, D. A.; Donnelly-Nolan, J. (eds.), Central High Cascade Roadside Geology: Bend, Sisters, McKenzie Pass, and Santiam Pass, Oregon, Circular, doi:10.3133/cir838, Circular 838, archived from the original on 2018-11-14.
- Taylor, E. M. (July 1965). "Recent volcanism between Three Fingered Jack and North Sister, Oregon Cascade Range, Part I: History of Volcanic Activity" (PDF). The Ore Bin. 27 (7). Oregon Department of Geology and Mineral Industries: 121–148. Archived (PDF) from the original on 2017-03-15.
- Taylor, E. M.; Causey, J. D. (1984), "Mount Washington Wilderness, Oregon", in Marsh, S. P.; Kropschot, S. J.; Dickinson, R. G. (eds.), Wilderness Mineral Potential: Assessment of Mineral-Resource Potential in U.S. Forest Service Lands Studied 1964-1984, United States Geological Survey, pp. 893–895, Bibcode:1984usgs.rept...15M, doi:10.3133/pp1300, Geological Survey Professional Paper Issue 1300, Volume 2, archived from the original on 2018-11-06.
- Taylor, E. M.; Causey, J. D.; MacLeod, N. S. (1983), "Geology and mineral resource potential map of the Mount Washington Wilderness, Deschutes, Lane and Linn Counties, Oregon" (PDF), Open-File Report, United States Geological Survey, doi:10.3133/ofr83662, Open-File Report 83-662, archived (PDF) from the original on 2019-04-29.
- Voth, E. (June 1963). A Survey of the Vertebrate Animals of Mount Jefferson, Oregon (Thesis). University of Oregon.
- Williams, H. (1944). Volcanoes of the Three Sisters region, Oregon Cascades. Vol. 27. Berkeley, California: University of California Press. ASIN B007QA4EWW. Archived from the original on 2018-11-14.
- Wood, C. A.; Kienle, J., eds. (1990). Volcanoes of North America: United States and Canada. Cambridge University Press. ISBN 978-0521438117.
- Wuerthner, G. (2003). "Mount Washington Wilderness". Oregon's Wilderness Areas: The Complete Guide. Big Earth Publishing. pp. 135–138. ISBN 978-1565794344.
