= Hoodoo Butte =

Mountain in Oregon, United States

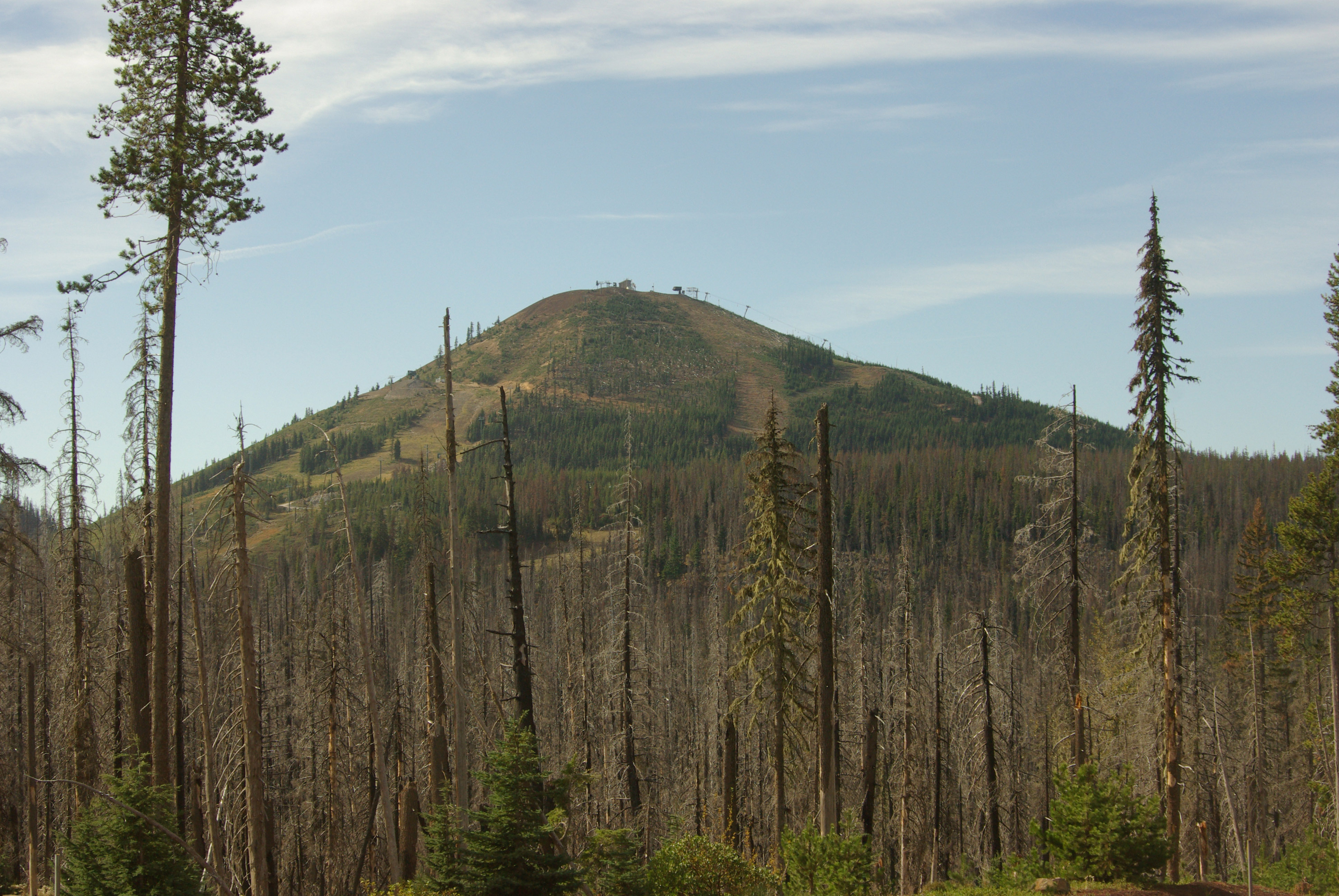

Highest point
- Elevation: 5,597 ft (1,706 m)
- Coordinates: 44°24′06″N 121°53′03″W

Geography
- Location: Linn County, Oregon, U.S.
- Parent range: Cascades
- Topo map: USGS Santiam Junction

Geology
- Mountain type: Cinder cone

Climbing
- Easiest route: Chairlift

Hoodoo Butte is a cinder cone butte in the Cascade Range of northern Oregon, located near Santiam Pass. Immediately to the east lies Hayrick Butte, a prime example of a tuya; the two mountains' names were likely mistaken for each other, but stuck with them over time. The area has been subjected to a number of historic fires. Hoodoo is sometimes considered a subfeature of the Mount Washington shield volcano, and it forms part of the Sisters Reach, which extends from South Cinder Peak to Crane Prairie Reservoir, running for 56 miles (90 km). This region has a high vent density, with many mafic (rich in magnesium and iron) volcanoes of Pleistocene to Holocene age, such as Hoodoo. While Hoodoo has an intact summit crater that was blocked from erosion by glaciers, it has an irregular topography, giving it an open appearance.

A ski area, also named Hoodoo, is located on the northwest through northeast flanks of the cone, and includes five chairlifts. Other recreational activities popular in the area include snowshoeing and snowmobiling during the winter, and fishing, hiking, camping, mountain biking, windsurfing, and water skiing popular during the summer season.

== Geography ==
Hoodoo Butte lies in Linn County, in the northern part of the U.S. state of Oregon. With an elevation of 5,597 feet (1,706 m),^{[a]} it has a large, rounded shape, rising about 500 feet (150 m) above the surrounding platform. The volcano lies 44 miles (71 km) northwest of the city of Bend and about 130 miles (210 km) southeast of Portland.

=== Physical geography ===
In 1967, a stand replacement fire (a fire that kills most if not all of the living upper canopy layer in the forest and initiates succession or regrowth) burned through 5,000 acres (20 km^{2}) of the surrounding Santiam Pass area. It reached the vegetation on the eastern and southern flanks of Hoodoo Butte, leaving patches of trees compared to the denser forest on the northern slope. Forest fires tore through the region again during the summer of 2003.

Soil on the mountain ranges from shallow to moderately deep with loam, and tends to be loose and cindery.

=== Ecology ===
Bird species near Hoodoo include woodpeckers and bald eagles. Deer and American black bears frequent the surrounding area.

== Geology ==
Hoodoo Butte lies near the Santiam Pass area, in the eastern segment of the Cascade Range known as the High Cascades, which trends north–south. Constructed towards the end of the Pleistocene epoch, these mountains are underlain by more ancient volcanoes that subsided due to parallel north–south faulting in the surrounding region. In the region stretching south from Mount Jefferson to Santiam Pass, shield volcanoes dominate, forming a broad ridge with cinder cones. Eruptions at these vents have produced rocks with compositions ranging from basaltic andesite to andesite and basalt lavas. The majority of rock in the region consists of normally polarized material less than 730,000 years old.

Hoodoo Butte is part of the Sisters Reach, which extends from South Cinder Peak to Crane Prairie Reservoir, running for 56 miles (90 km). With at least 466 volcanoes active during the Quaternary, it has a high vent density, with many mafic (rich in magnesium and iron) volcanoes of Pleistocene to Holocene age. Hoodoo Butte is one of the larger mafic volcanoes, along with Three Fingered Jack, North Sister, and the vents of the Mount Bachelor chain.

Sometimes considered a subfeature of the Mount Washington shield volcano, Hoodoo forms one of several glaciated remnants of Pleistocene volcanoes in the region, other nearby examples including Maxwell Butte and Cache Mountain. It is a cinder cone and possesses an intact summit crater, since the neighboring andesite lava dome of Hayrick Butte prevented Pleistocene glaciers from reaching Hoodoo's summit. The crater is open to the east as a result of its irregular topography, which led to uneven distribution of ejected material such that most of the volcanic rock that forms the edifice was deposited elsewhere. The cinder cone is surrounded by volcanic ash from the Sand Mountain Cones which was moved by water, and some of this ash forms a layer on the floor of the summit crater.

== Human history ==
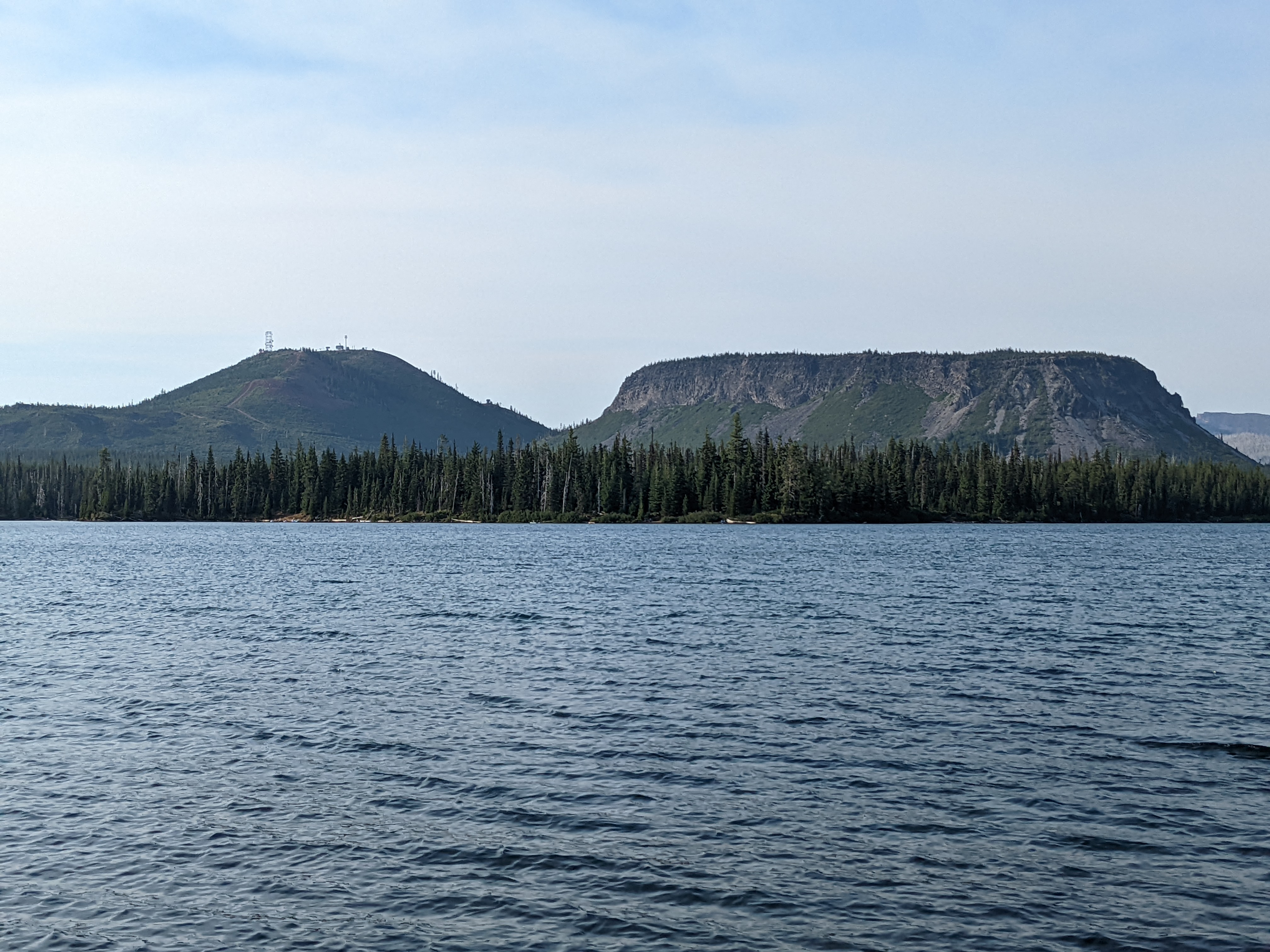
Hoodoo Butte (left) and Hayrick Butte (right). It is easy to see why some have concluded that the two names must have been accidentally mixed up.

According to one local story, a cartographer accidentally switched the names for Hoodoo Butte and the nearby tuya Hayrick Butte. The word "hoodoo" refers to rock buttresses like those observed at the nearby Hayrick Butte, while "hayrick" is a synonym for haystack, a more fitting name for Hoodoo Butte, which has a profile that resembles a haystack shape. Whether or not this error actually occurred remains unclear, but the names remain to present day. The name Hoodoo Butte was confirmed by the United States Board on Geographic Names on November 28, 1980.

The top of Hoodoo Butte has electronic communication relay sites, which are owned by AT&T and Bend Telecommunications.

== Recreation ==
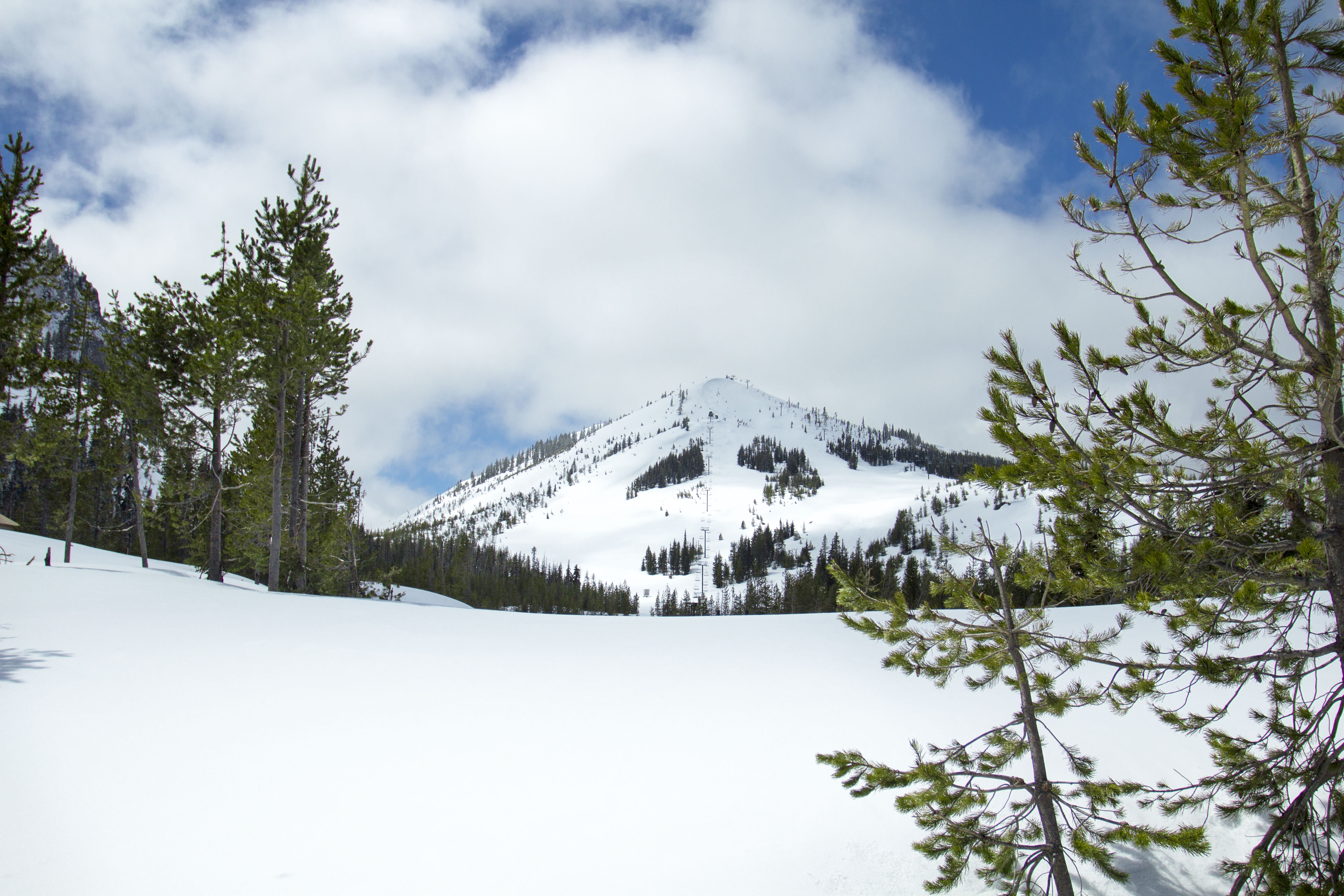
Hoodoo Butte, covered with snow

The Hoodoo ski area, a popular winter sports destination, sits on Hoodoo Butte. It encompasses 800 acres (3.2 km^{2}) with 34 trail runs, five chairlifts, a snow tubing park, night skiing, lodges, rental and repair stores, and a day-care building. First built in 1938, the original ski area was supported by a group funded by Ed Thurston of Eugene. Following World War II, the ski area embarked on improvements, including lodging and chairlifts. The oldest ski area in the Central Cascades, the Hoodoo area offers terrains for all levels of skiing. It closes to off-road motorized vehicle use from November 1 through May 15.

In addition to skiing, snowshoeing and snowmobiling are popular winter activities in the area, with fishing, hiking, camping, and mountain biking popular during the summer season. The Hoodoo Ski Bowl offers scenic views of the local region. Fishing is a popular recreational activity in the area, particularly for brook and cutthroat trout at Big Lake, 3 miles (4.8 km) south via the ski area's access road. Recreational boating, windsurfing, and water skiing are also common during the summer.

== See also ==
- Santiam Highway
- Hogg Rock

== Notes ==
- [a] Other sources list the elevation at 5,703 feet (1,738 m).
