= Scott Mountain (Lane County, Oregon) =

Mountain in Oregon, United States

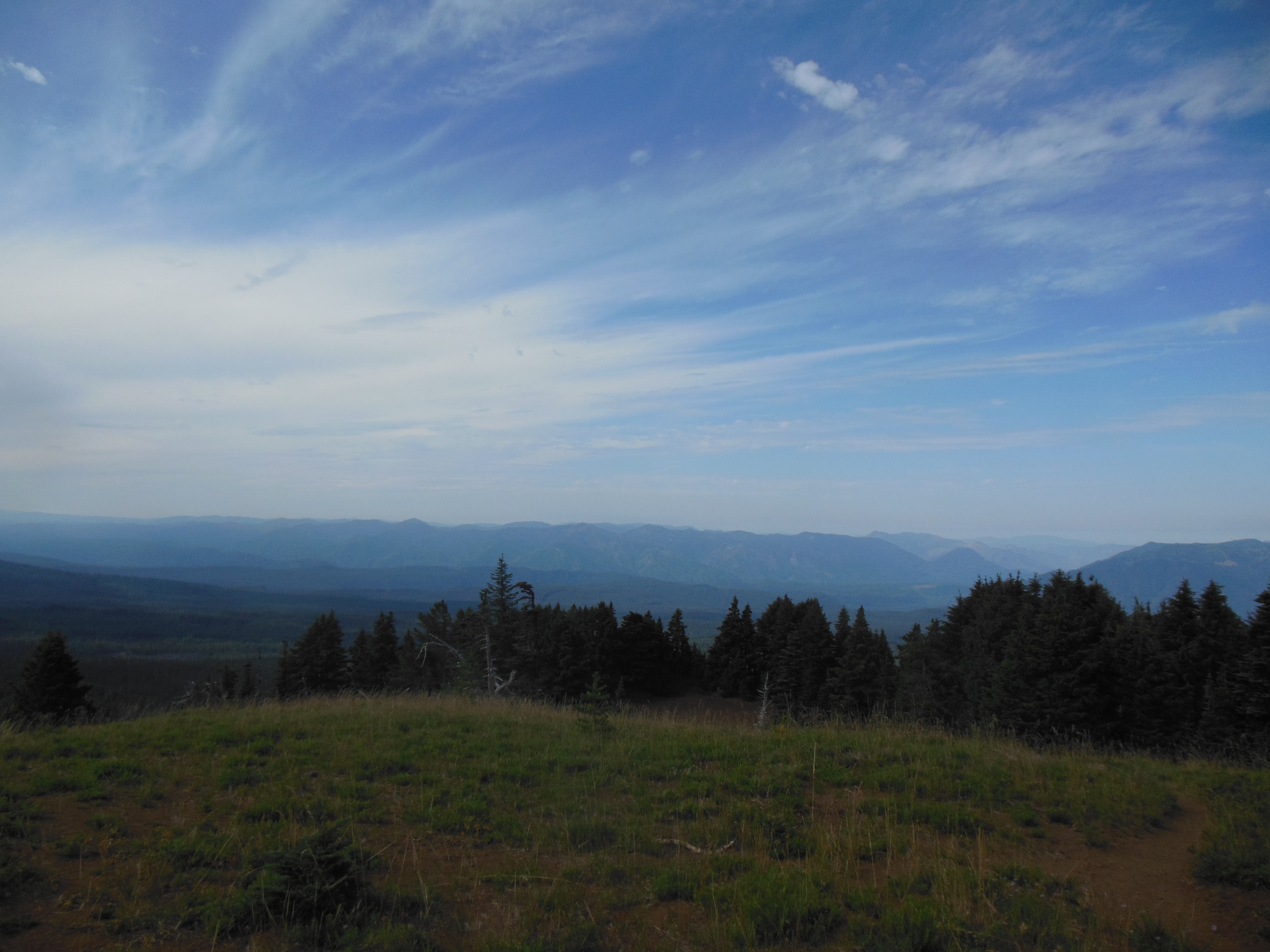
- View southwest from the meadow atop Scott Mountain

Highest point
- Elevation: 6,099 ft (1,859 m) NAVD 88
- Prominence: 1,196 ft (365 m)
- Coordinates: 44°14′26″N 121°54′54″W

Geography
- Location within Oregon
- Location: Mount Washington Wilderness; Willamette National Forest; Lane County, Oregon, U.S.
- Parent range: Cascades
- Topo map: USGS Linton Lake

Climbing
- Easiest route: Trail hike

Scott Mountain is a summit in Lane County, Oregon, in the United States. The 6,103-foot (1,860 m) mountain is in the Mount Washington Wilderness region of the Willamette National Forest.

== History ==
Scott Mountain and Scott Lake, in Lane County, were both named after Felix Scott Jr., a cattle rancher and businessman. With the help of brother Marion Scott and other local residents, Felix Scott hired fifty or more men to build a road up the McKenzie River in 1862.

== Geology ==
Scott Mountain is a cinder cone.

== See also ==
- Scott Mountain (Douglas County, Oregon)
