= Hayrick Butte =

Mountain in United States of America

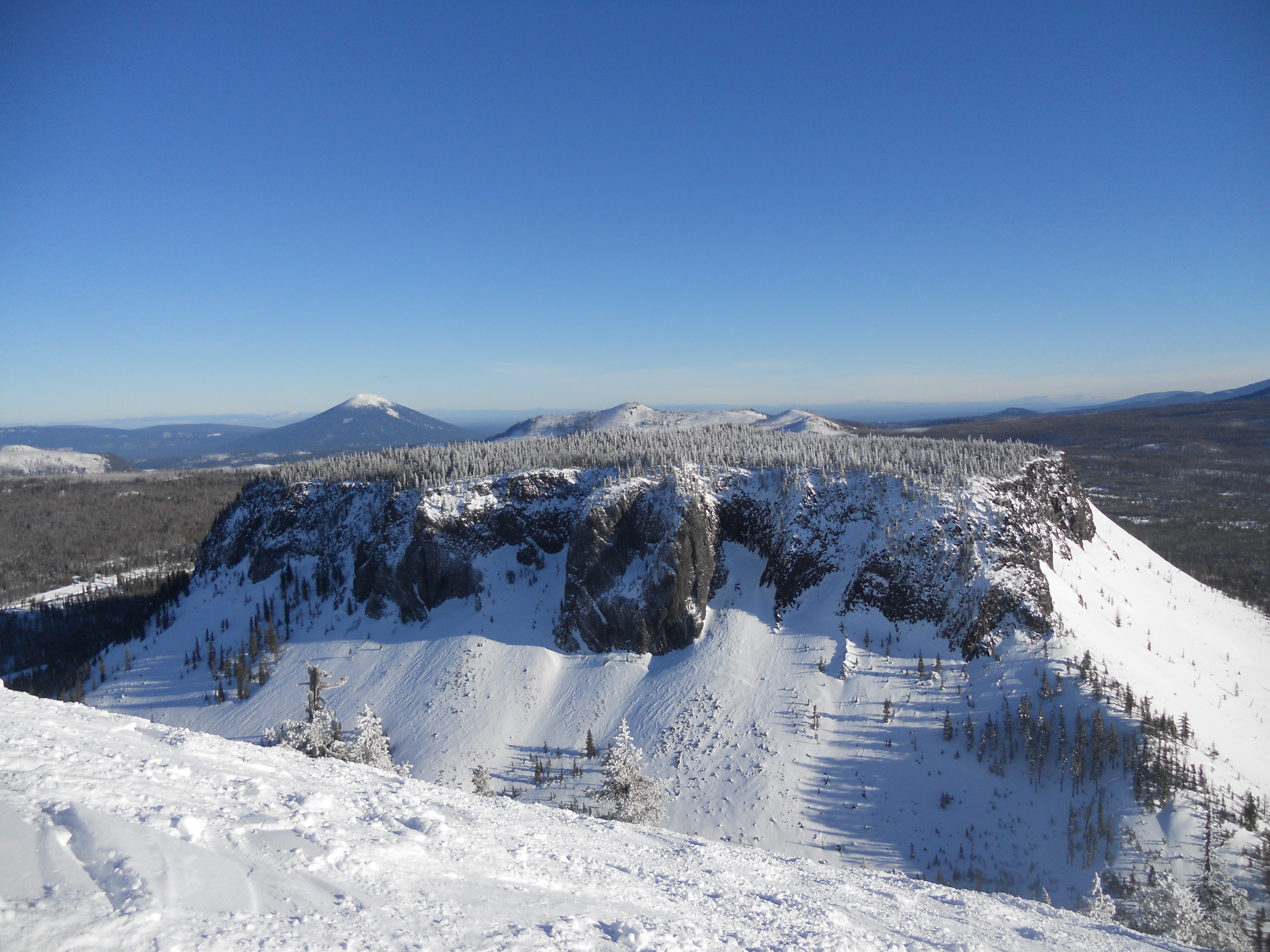
- Hayrick Butte seen from the top of Hoodoo Ski Area

Highest point
- Elevation: 5,482 ft (1,671 m)
- Coordinates: 44°23′57″N 121°52′17″W

Geography
- Location within Oregon
- Location: Linn County, Oregon, U.S.
- Parent range: Cascades
- Topo map: United States Geological Survey Three Fingered Jack

Geology
- Mountain type: Tuya

Hayrick Butte is a tuya, a type of subglacial volcano, in Linn County, Oregon, United States. Located on the Willamette National Forest near Santiam Pass, it lies adjacent to Hoodoo Butte, a cinder cone which has a ski area. Hayrick Butte likely formed when lava erupted underneath an overlying glacier or ice sheet, producing the flat top with near-vertical walls along the ice-contact margin as the lava cooled and hardened. Hayrick Butte has a nearly flat plateau about 0.5 miles (0.80 km) across and steep walls rising about 700 feet (0.21 km) above its surroundings. A cartographer accidentally switched the names for nearby Hoodoo Butte and Hayrick Butte; the word "hoodoo" usually refers to rock piles and pinnacles like those observed at Hayrick Butte.

Compared to Hoodoo Butte, Hayrick is less popular for recreation, though it can be climbed, and there are hiking, snowshoeing, and snowmobile routes surrounding the butte. Its north-facing slope has subalpine forests with mountain hemlock and fir, which are common in the Cascades.

== Geography ==
Hayrick Butte is located in the Cascade Range in eastern Linn County in the U.S. state of Oregon. It lies south of Three Fingered Jack near Hoodoo Butte, Sand Mountain Field, Potato Butte, and Black Butte, with Belknap Crater and Mount Washington farther to the south. Administratively, it is within the McKenzie Ranger District of the Willamette National Forest. According to the Geographic Names Information System, Hayrick Butte has an elevation of 5,482 feet (1,671 m); in 1980, the Willamette National Forest Gazetteer listed its elevation as 5,575 feet (1,699 m). The butte has a width of about 0.5 miles (0.80 km).

Hayrick Butte is located next to the Hoodoo ski area. In response to a new master plan at the Hoodoo Ski Bowl in 1995, the United States Forest Service released a draft environmental impact statement for the surroundings. The Forest Service argued that development at Hoodoo Butte and Hayrick Butte would require excavating and/or blasting 20,000 to 28,000 cubic yards (15,000 to 21,000 m^{3}) of soil and rock on Hayrick Butte, which would potentially exacerbate erosion of local soil. The removal of this soil and rock would also substantially limit future revegetation, further reducing soil productivity in the area.

== Ecology ==
The Oregon Department of Fish and Wildlife determined in the early 1990s that there was potential for peregrine falcon nests at Hayrick Butte, though it was considered low-quality habitat because of its lack of suitable ledges and high amounts of human disturbance. The forest on the steep, north-facing slope of Hayrick Butte consists of mountain hemlock and mature fir trees at an elevation of 5,090 feet (1,550 m). Oroboreal subalpine forests like these usually occur above elevations of 4,900 feet (1,500 m) in the Cascades, in areas with cool, wet climates. Mean precipitation for these zones ranges from 1,500 to 3,000 millimetres (59 to 118 in), with cool summers and cold, snowy winters. Dense forests are less common at higher elevations, where typically patchy forest stands are separated by shrubland or meadows.

== Geology ==
=== Summary ===
About 4.5 million years ago, eruption of mafic lava filled a subsiding Pliocene depression, creating the modern, mafic High Cascades. The part of the High Cascades that extends south from Mount Jefferson to Santiam Pass includes shield volcanoes, lava domes, and cinder cones. Like Hogg Rock, Hayrick Butte is a flat-topped, andesitic lava dome and tuya of late Pleistocene age. The andesitic lava is porphyritic and contains plagioclase, orthopyroxene and trace phenocrysts of olivine. Both Hayrick Butte and Hogg Rock have been eroded by Pleistocene glaciation, leaving glassy margins and jointing. Hayrick Butte blocked the advance of glacial ice from eroding the summit crater of Hoodoo Butte.

=== Geologic setting ===
Most lava domes in the Cascades occur in clusters or surrounding just a few major volcanic centers. There are roughly 190 known lava domes in the state of Oregon, with 40 near Mount Jefferson, 22 near the Tumalo volcanic highland, 28 near the Three Sisters, and close to 60 surrounding Mount Mazama. Hayrick Butte, however, is more isolated from other volcanoes. Hayrick Butte, along with Benchmark Butte, formed more than 12 miles (20 km) from any major stratovolcano.

The high elevation of Matuyama-aged rocks east of Santiam Pass, coupled with exposure of Brunhes-aged rocks to the west, imply the presence of a northward-trending normal fault.

=== Geochemistry ===
Hayrick Butte has a normal magnetic polarity. Like Hogg Rock and other andesite lava domes in the area, it has lower incompatible element abundances than surrounding andesitic rock deposits. A 1992 element abundance analysis of Hayrick Butte andesite samples from the margin of the volcano shows a silicon dioxide (silica) level of 60.1 percent, aluminum oxide level of 18.4 percent, calcium oxide level of 6.24 percent, iron(II) oxide level of 5.55 percent, and sodium oxide level of 4.42 percent. Magnesium oxide made up 3.3 percent of the samples, with potassium oxide levels at 1.08 percent and manganese(II) oxide, phosphorus pentoxide, and titanium dioxide all below 1 percent. Additional studies from 1980 and 1983 exhibit similar levels of silica in samples from Hogg Rock and Hayrick Butte at about 59–60 percent.

== Human history ==
According to cartographer Stuart Allen, an early cartographer accidentally switched the names for nearby Hoodoo Butte and Hayrick Butte. The word "hoodoo" refers to rock piles and pinnacles like those observed at Hayrick Butte, while "hayrick" is a synonym for haystack, a more fitting name for Hoodoo Butte, which has a profile that resembles a haystack shape. Whether or not this error actually occurred remains unclear, but the names remain to present day.

== Recreation ==
The Obsidian Climb School and Eugene Mountain Rescue offer climbing classes and field sessions at Hayrick Butte. A tubing hill (Autobahn Tubing Park) is on the lower part of the north flank of the butte with 800-foot (240 m) long tube lanes serviced by a handle tow. A backcountry snowshoeing trail runs for 4 miles (6.4 km) from the Hoodoo ski area, rising about 200 feet (61 m) in elevation over its course. The route travels between Hayrick and Hoodoo Butte, offering views of Mount Washington. There is an avalanche hazard near Hayrick's base. An old roadbed next to the trail travels up Hoodoo Butte to the Hoodoo Butte Plateau and the butte's summit, where a historic fire cleared many trees. There are snowmobile routes down the old Santiam Pass Wagon Road to the south and Forest Road 2690 to the east, as well as a geocache at Hayrick's summit. Markian Hawryluk of The Bulletin in Bend described Hayrick as "antisocial" compared to the "family-friendly ski area" of Hoodoo Butte, citing its 700-foot (210 m) tall, nearly vertical walls. The tuya is also surrounded by cliffs. William Sullivan of The Register-Guard wrote that Hayrick offered "breathtaking views" of Mount Jefferson, Big Lake, Hoodoo Butte, Mount Washington, and Black Butte. Hayrick Butte is also visible from the 6.9-mile (11.1 km) Patjens Lake Loop trail near Santiam Pass.

== Sources ==
- Andersen, S. (2001). "Hayrick Butte". Snowshoe Routes: Oregon. The Mountaineers Books. pp. 107–109. ISBN 978-0898868333.
- "Chapter 3: Affected Environment", Willamette National Forest (N.F.), Hoodoo Master Plan, Linn County: Environmental Impact Statement, United States Forest Service, August 1995, archived from the original on January 31, 2021.
- Conrey, R. M.; Taylor, E. M.; Donnelly-Nolan, J. M.; Sherrod, D. R. (2002), Moore, G. W. (ed.), "North-central Oregon Cascades; exploring petrologic and tectonic intimacy in a propagating intra-arc rift" (PDF), Field guide to geologic processes in Cascadia; field trips to accompany the 98th annual meeting of the Cordilleran Section of the Geological Society of America, vol. 36, Oregon Department of Geology and Mineral Industries, pp. 47–90, archived (PDF) from the original on August 27, 2017.
- "Directory to Campgrounds, Picnic Areas, Mountains, Lakes, Rivers, Creeks and Prairies", Willamette National Forest Gazetteer, United States Forest Service, 1980, archived from the original on December 19, 2018.
- Gannett, H. (1903), Langille, H. D.; Plummer, F. G.; Dodwell, A.; Rixon, T. F.; Leiberg, J. B. (eds.), "Forest conditions in the Cascade Range Forest Reserve, Oregon", USGS Report, 9, United States Geological Survey: 15–26, Bibcode:1903usgs.rept....1L, doi:10.3133/pp9, hdl:027/hvd.32044102886108, Professional Paper 9, archived from the original on December 18, 2018
- Harris, S. L. (2005). Fire Mountains of the West: The Cascade and Mono Lake Volcanoes (3rd ed.). Mountain Press Publishing Company. ISBN 978-0-87842-511-2.
- Hildreth, W. (2007), Quaternary Magmatism in the Cascades, Geologic Perspectives, United States Geological Survey, Professional Paper 1744, archived from the original on March 25, 2019.
- Hill, B. E. (1991). Petrogenesis of compositionally distinct silicic volcanoes in the Three Sisters region of the Oregon Cascade Range: the effects of crustal extension on the development of continental arc silicic magmatism (Thesis). Oregon State University. Archived from the original on December 19, 2018.
- Hill, B. E.; Priest, G. R. (1992), Hill, B. E. (ed.), "Geologic setting of the Santiam Pass area, central Cascade Range, Oregon", Geology and geothermal resources of the Santiam Pass area of the Oregon Cascade Range, Deschutes, Jefferson, and Linn Counties, Oregon, Oregon Department of Geology and Mineral Industries, pp. 5–18, doi:10.2172/7018867, OSTI 7018867, Open-File Report O-92-3, archived from the original on January 31, 2021.
- Hughes, S. S.; Taylor, E. M. (August 1986). "Geochemistry, petrogenesis, and tectonic implications of central High Cascade mafic platform lavas". GSA Bulletin. 97 (8). Geological Society of America: 1024–1036. Bibcode:1986GSAB...97.1024H. doi:10.1130/0016-7606(1986)97<1024:GPATIO>2.0.CO;2.
- "Obsidian Climb School at the Coburg Caves" (PDF), The Obsidian Bulletin, vol. 78, no. 3, The Obsidians, pp. 1–14, March 2018, archived (PDF) from the original on December 19, 2018.
- Rikkinen, J. (2003a). "Calicioid lichens and fungi in the forests and woodlands of western Oregon". Acta Botanica Fennica. 175. Finnish Zoological and Botanical Publishing Board: 1–41. ISSN 0001-5369. Archived from the original on January 31, 2021.
- Rikkinen, J. (2003b). "New resinicolous ascomycetes from beaver scars in western North America". Annales Botanici Fennici. 40 (6). Finnish Zoological and Botanical Publishing Board: 443–450. ISSN 0003-3847. JSTOR 23726801.
- Sherrod, D. R.; Taylor, E. M.; Ferns, M. L.; Scott, W. E.; Conrey, R. M.; Smith, G. A. (2004), Geologic Map of the Bend 30- × 60-Minute Quadrangle, Central Oregon (PDF), United States Geological Survey, Geologic Investigations Series I–2683, archived from the original on January 7, 2019.
- Taylor, E. M. (1981), "Guides to Some Volcanic Terranes in Washington, Idaho, Oregon, and Northern California", in Johnston, D. A.; Donnelly-Nolan, J. (eds.), Road log for central High Cascade geology, Bend, Sisters, McKenzie Pass, and Santiam Pass, Oregon, Circular, pp. 59–83, doi:10.3133/cir838, Circular 838, archived from the original on November 14, 2018.
- Willamette National Forest (N.F.), Santiam Pass Forest Health Project, Linn County: Environmental Impact Statement, United States Forest Service, May 1995, archived from the original on January 31, 2021.
- Wood, C. A.; Kienle, J., eds. (1990). Volcanoes of North America: United States and Canada. Cambridge University Press. ISBN 978-0521438117.
