= Santiam Pass =

Mountain Pass in Oregon, United States

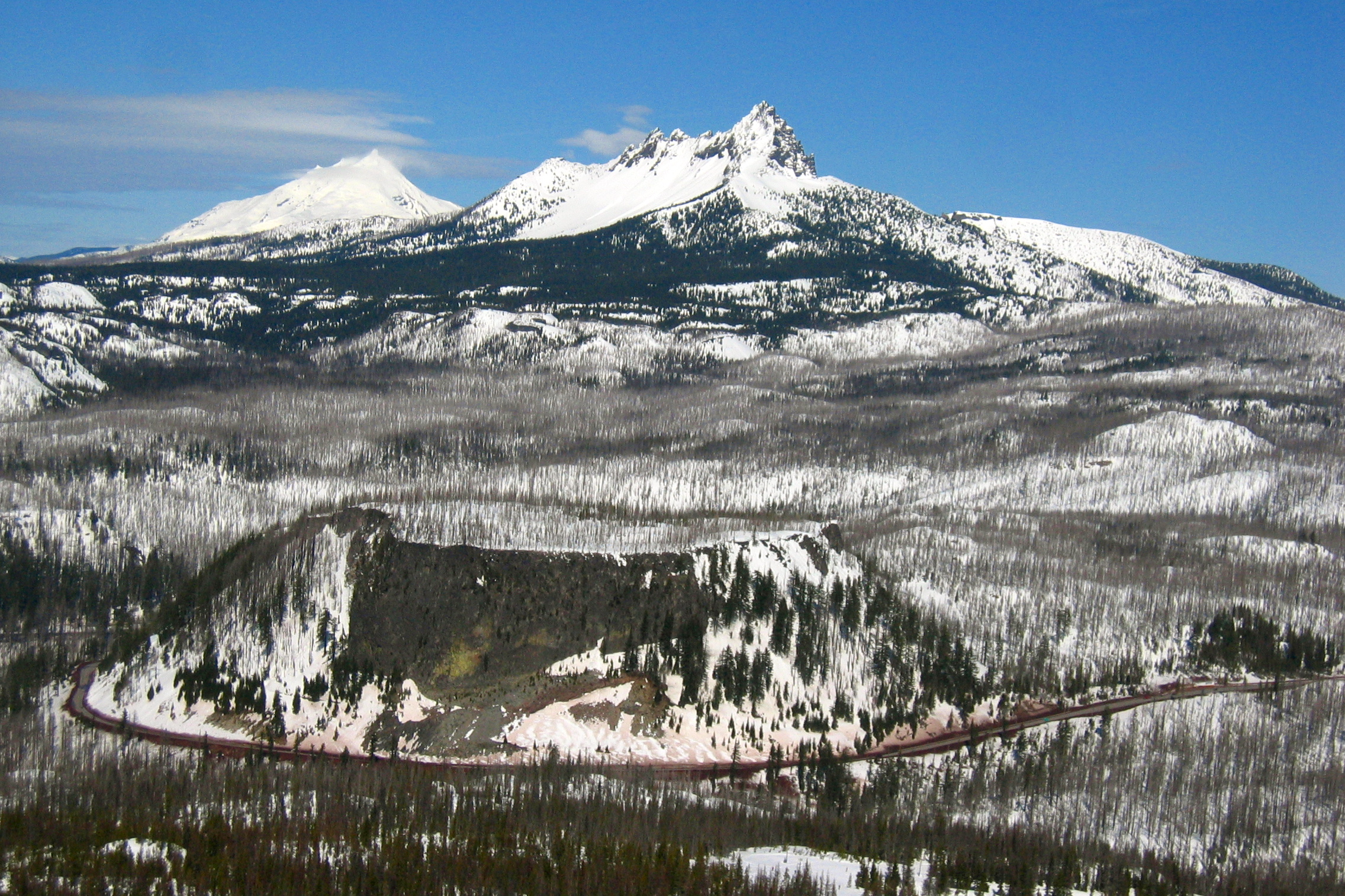
- Mount Jefferson, Three Fingered Jack, Hogg Rock and U.S. Route 20 near Santiam Pass
- Interactive map of Santiam Pass
- Elevation: 4,817 ft (1,468 m)
- Traversed by: US 20

Third Approach
- Location: Jefferson – Linn counties, Oregon, United States
- Range: Cascades
- Coordinates: 44°23.3′N 121°50.7′W

Santiam Pass is a 4,817-foot (1,468 m) mountain pass in the Cascade Range in central Oregon in the United States. It is located on the border between Linn and Jefferson counties, about 18 mi (29 km) northwest of Sisters, between the prominent volcanic horns of Three Fingered Jack to the north and Mount Washington to the south. Several other smaller volcanoes, including cinder cones and tuyas, are found near the summit of the pass. U.S. Route 20 connects eastern Oregon with the valley of the Santiam River on the west via Santiam Pass. One of the 19 or 20 lakes by the name of Lost Lake is located beside the highway just west of Santiam Pass. The pass may be approached from the west by three distinct routes:

- Oregon Route 22, also known as the North Santiam Highway, proceeds southeast from Salem and follows the North Santiam River to Santiam Junction.
- U.S. Route 20, which follows the South Santiam River from the Albany–Corvallis area to Santiam Junction.
- Oregon Route 126, which follows the McKenzie River northeast from Eugene.

From the east, Santiam Pass is approached from the town of Sisters; however, immediately east of Sisters, U. S. Highway 20 and Oregon Route 126, which share the route over the pass, split with Oregon Route 126 going northeast to Redmond and Prineville, Oregon and U. S. Route 20 heading southeast to Bend.

== History ==
While the pass was known by native peoples, the first recorded crossing of the pass was in April 1859 by an expedition searching for a cattle trail over the Cascade Range from the Willamette Valley to Central Oregon. This expedition was led by Andrew Wiley, who reportedly climbed a tall tree on a mountain near Lost Prairie to help determine the route. Lost Prairie is located along Hackleman Creek between Fish Lake and Tombstone Prairie. Wiley later helped establish the Santiam Wagon Road.

Originally known as Hogg Pass, after Col. T. Egenton Hogg who designated this crossing for his proposed railroad, Santiam Pass was renamed in 1929 when the Santiam Highway was completed. The original Santiam Pass is located three miles south and was discovered in 1859.

== Climate ==
Santiam Pass has a subarctic climate with cold, extremely snowy winters and mild to sometimes warm summers with occasional precipitation. While it is subarctic, the average winter temperatures hover around the upper 20s. Part of this is due to its latitudal location and being only over 4000 feet in elevation, but it is also due to the significant amount of winter snow, at about 450 inches seen annually, that can moderate the temperatures. Temperatures can, however, still reach the negatives a couple days per year and single digits for a good number of days, usually dry. Santiam Pass's crest location allows for some of the highest snowfall totals in the US to fall onto it and for more summer rainfall than the surrounding lower elevated areas may see as well.

== Nearby volcanoes ==
- Three Fingered Jack
- Hogg Rock
- Hoodoo Butte
- Hayrick Butte
- Mount Washington

== See also ==
- McKenzie Pass – Santiam Pass Scenic Byway
- Santiam Junction State Airport, located west of the pass along U.S. Route 20
- Santiam Wagon Road
