= Mount Washington Wilderness =

Wilderness area on and around Mount Washington in Oregon

- IUCN category Ib (wilderness area)
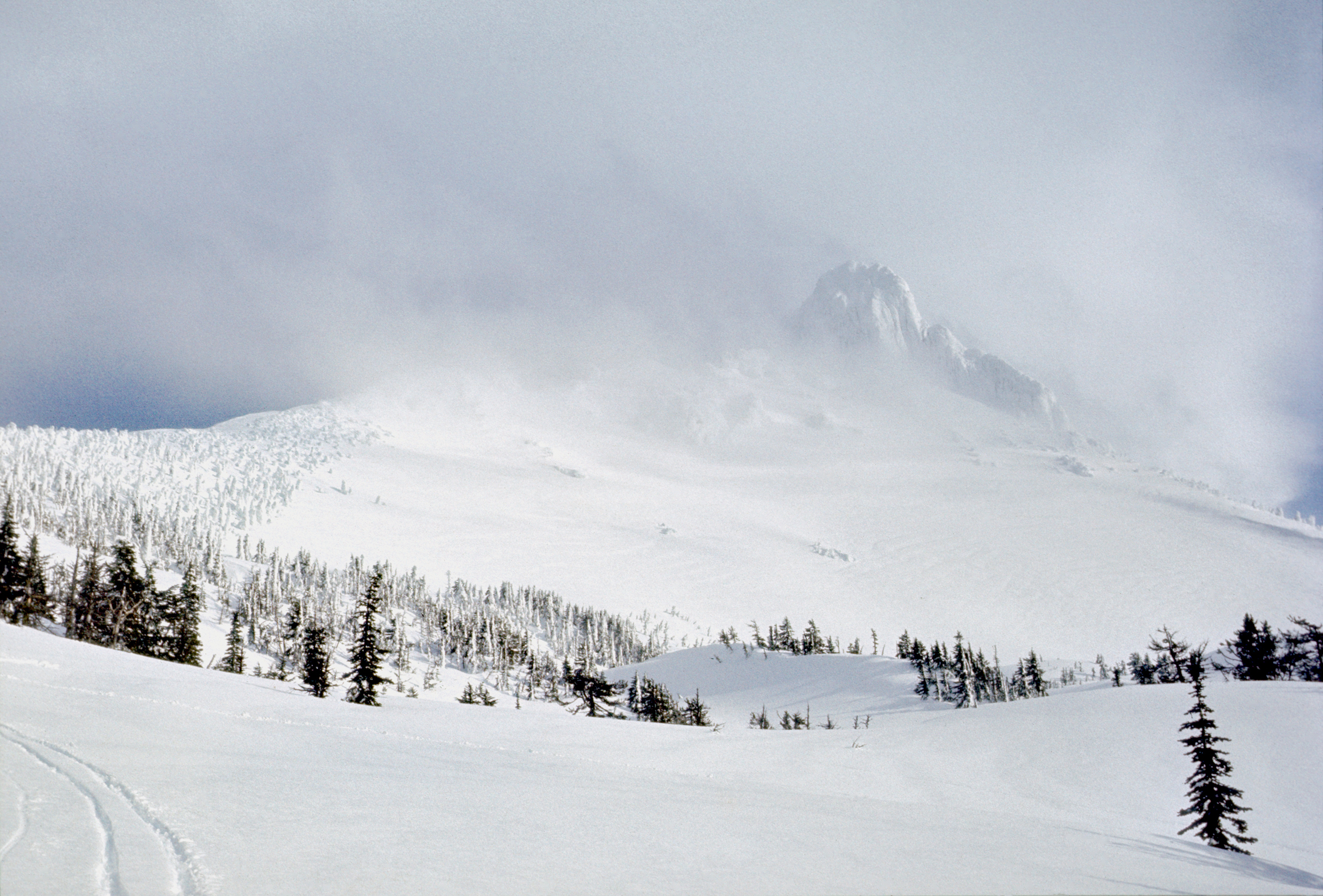
- On the route to a winter ascent of Mount Washington

- Location within the United States
- Location: Linn / Deschutes / Lane counties, Oregon, United States
- Nearest city: Sisters, Oregon
- Coordinates: 44°19′55.65″N 121°50′18.70″W
- Area: 54,278 acres (219.66 km^{2})
- Established: 1964
- Governing body: U.S. Forest Service

The Mount Washington Wilderness is a wilderness area located on and around Mount Washington in the central Cascade Range of Oregon in the United States. The wilderness was established in 1964 and comprises 54,278 acres (219.66 km^{2}) of the Willamette National Forest and Deschutes National Forest. It is administered by the U.S. Forest Service.

== Geography ==
Mount Washington is a shield volcano rising above 75 square miles (190 km^{2}) of lava-strewn plains. The wilderness includes Belknap Crater, a 6,873-foot (2,095 m) cinder and ash volcanic cone. Vegetation consists primarily of lodgepole pine, other species of pine, and mountain hemlock. There are 28 lakes in the wilderness. The Pacific Crest National Scenic Trail extends for 16.6 miles (26.7 km) through the Mount Washington Wilderness. It is the primary trail and extends from the north boundary near Big Lake to where it leaves the wilderness at its southern boundary near the Dee Wright Observatory.

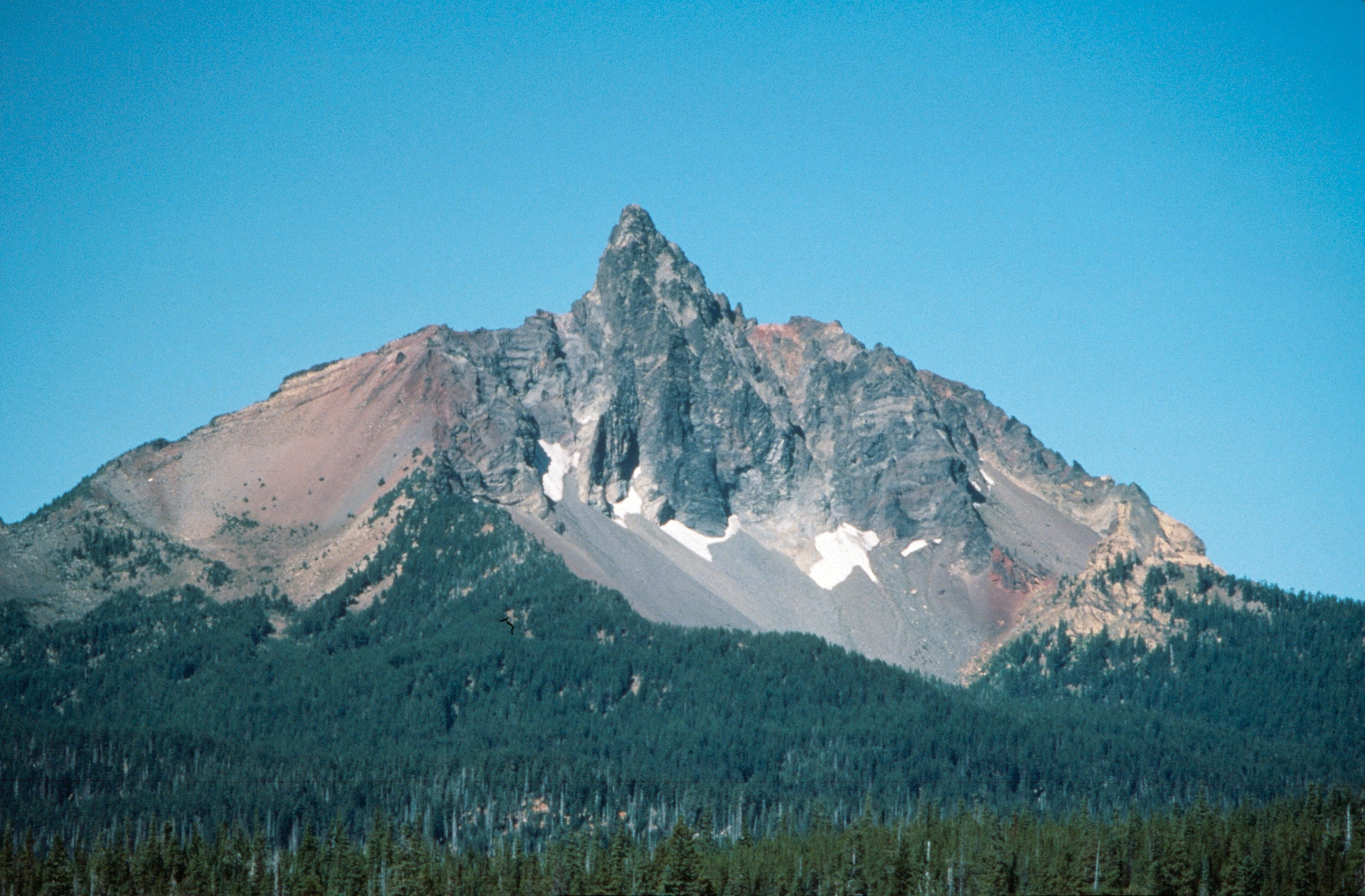
Mount Washington

== Ecology ==
Described by Wuerthner (2003) as a "rocks and ice wilderness", much of the Mount Washington Wilderness consists of lava flows and rubble. However, it does include some forested areas with stands of lodgepole pine, and there are 28 lakes in the northern and southwestern parts of the space. Vegetation in the Mount Washington Wilderness includes mountain hemlock, lodgepole pine, ponderosa pine, and whitebark pine. Ponderosa pine occurs at the eastern base of the volcano, with Douglas fir on the western side. On rough surfaces covered with lava, vegetation is less common, but there are some flows, including young lava flows, with trees growing on them. Mountain hemlock also grows on lava flows, and there is an understory of beargrass, huckleberry, and rhododendron. Animal life includes large animals such as deer and elk, with the rare American black bear or cougar. There are small animals in the Mount Washington Wilderness like pikas, marmots, martens, snowshoe hares, and ground squirrels. Lakes in the wilderness sustain populations of brook trout, cutthroat trout, and rainbow trout, and frogs can be observed around some of them.

== Recreation ==
The Mount Washington Wilderness lies near the Willamette Valley, which is heavily populated. While the area is not used as frequently as many other wilderness areas in the Oregon branch of the Cascade Range, it offers scenic lakes and trails. These include volcanic features such as lava flows from Mount Washington and Belknap Crater. Permits have been required for visitors since 1991; they are offered for no charge after Memorial Day through October 31. Motorized and mechanical equipment like drones or bicycles are prohibited. Visitation to the wilderness has declined since the mid-1990s but leveled off after the B&B Complex fires in 2003. Surveys suggest that about 50 percent of visitors to the Mount Washington Wilderness do not make campfires, a lower rate than other nearby wilderness areas. Additional surveys suggest that about 82 percent of respondents who come to the wilderness area to camp do so within 200 feet (61 m) of a lake.

There are forest roads which extend to the base of Mount Washington. The Pacific Crest Trail is the major path through the Mount Washington Wilderness, extending 16.6 miles (26.7 km) from the northern to southern edge of the area. Traversing lodgepole pine forest and lava flows, the trail passes over the western side of Mount Washington. The hike is challenging, ranging in elevation from 4,700 to 6,100 feet (1,400 to 1,900 m) with little sources of water. Other trails include a loop around the Patjens Lakes, the Hand Lake trail, and the Benson Lake route. Friendly for families and children, the Patjens Lake trail runs for 6 miles (9.7 km), only gaining 350 feet (110 m) in elevation. Water is abundant along the route, which passes through lodgepole pine forests with the occasional meadow. The Hand Lake and Benson Lake trails are also easy day hikes, lasting 0.5 miles (0.80 km) and 1.4 miles (2.3 km), respectively. One of the trails within the wilderness area, known as the Dry Creek Trail, is not maintained by the United States Forest Service and is no longer recommended as a hiking route due to fallen trees in fire-damaged forest. The U.S. National Geodetic Survey Data Sheet for Mount Washington notes that climbing the volcano is challenging and dangerous and thus is not recommended for inexperienced climbers or climbers without proper equipment.

== Mineral and geothermal potential ==
A mineral survey from 1980 through 1981 detected little potential for metallic mineral or fossil fuel resources in the Mount Washington Wilderness. The area contains large amounts of cinder, more than 200,000,000 cubic yards (0.15 km^{3}), but there are alternate sources in the region, which are sufficient to meet local demands. Likewise, there are no mines in the area, nor any documented history of mining claims; the closest mines are located 20 miles (32 km) to the west in the Blue River mining district. The volcanic vents throughout the Mount Washington Wilderness are underlain by Eocene to Pliocene volcanic rock layers, which do not contain hydrocarbons for fossil fuels. While there is relatively little potential for geothermal energy in the High Cascades, there are hot springs along the western edge of the mountain range. The Belknap Hot Spring lies 4 miles (6.4 km) to the southwest of the wilderness area, ejecting water at a rate of 75 U.S. gallons (280 L) per minute with a temperature of 180 °F (82 °C). The Mount Washington Wilderness has unknown geothermal potential as there have been few holes deep enough to assess its geothermal resources. Silicic bodies of intrusive rock are typically greater in size than more mafic rock in shallow crust, but geologically young, silicic rock does not occur within the Washington wilderness area.

== See also ==
- List of Oregon Wildernesses
- List of U.S. Wilderness Areas
- Wilderness Act

== Sources ==
- Brown, Ryan N.K.; Rosenberger, Randall S.; Kline, Jeffrey D.; Hall, Troy E.; Needham, Mark D. (January 2008), "Visitor Preferences for Managing Wilderness Recreation after Wildfire", Journal of Forestry, 106 (1): 9–16, doi:10.1093/jof/106.1.9
- Christensen, N. A.; Cole, D. N. (2000), Cole, D. N.; McCool, S. F.; Borrie, W. T.; O'Loughlin, J. (eds.), "Leave no trace practices: behaviors and preferences of wilderness visitors regarding use of cookstoves and camping away from lakes", Wilderness science in a time of change conference, vol. 4, United States Forest Service Rocky Mountain Research Station, pp. 77–85, archived from the original on November 15, 2018.
- Taylor, E. M.; Causey, J. D. (1984), "Mount Washington Wilderness, Oregon", in Marsh, S. P.; Kropschot, S. J.; Dickinson, R. G. (eds.), Wilderness Mineral Potential: Assessment of Mineral-Resource Potential in U.S. Forest Service Lands Studied 1964-1984, United States Geological Survey, pp. 893–895, doi:10.3133/pp1300, Geological Survey Professional Paper Issue 1300, Volume 2, archived from the original on November 6, 2018.
- Taylor, E. M.; Causey, J. D.; MacLeod, N. S. (1983), "Geology and mineral resource potential map of the Mount Washington Wilderness, Deschutes, Lane and Linn Counties, Oregon" (PDF), Open-File Report, United States Geological Survey, doi:10.3133/ofr83662, Open-File Report 83-662, archived (PDF) from the original on April 29, 2019.
- Wuerthner, G. (2003). "Mount Washington Wilderness". Oregon's Wilderness Areas: The Complete Guide. Big Earth Publishing. pp. 135–138. ISBN 978-1565794344.
