= Oregon Department of Geology and Mineral Industries =

Oregon Department of Geology and Mineral Industries (DOGAMI)
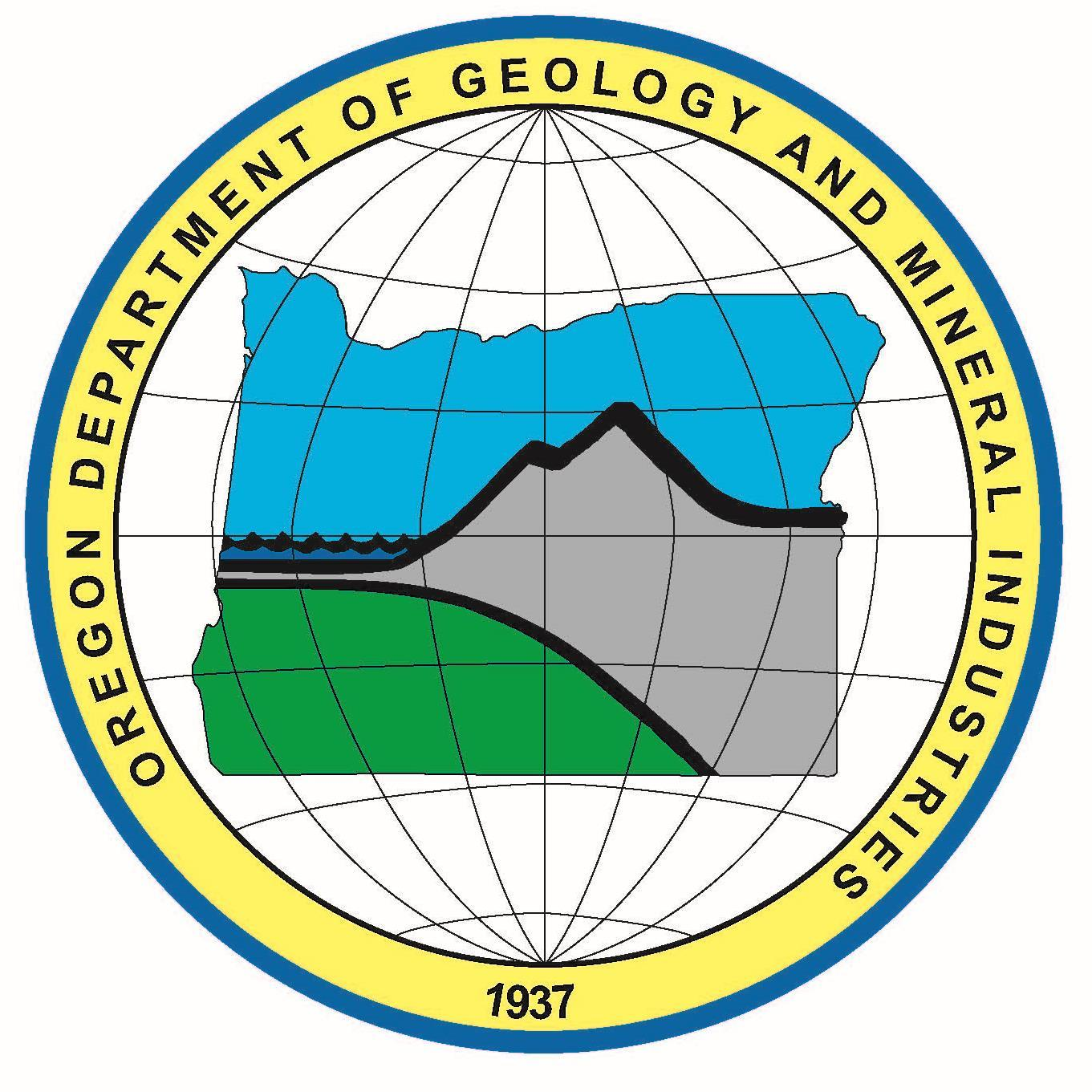
- Official seal of the Oregon Department of Geology and Mineral Industries

Agency overview
- Formed: 1937
- Headquarters: 800 NE Oregon Street, Suite 965 Portland, Oregon
- Annual budget: $20 Million 2021-23 (bi-annual)
- Agency executive: Brad Avy, State Geologist & Director
- Website: oregongeology.org

The Oregon Department of Geology and Mineral Industries (DOGAMI) is the agency of the government of the U.S. state of Oregon responsible for collecting, maintaining and disseminating geologic information, and regulation of industries which commercially develop the state's geological resources, including Natural gas, Crude oil, and other Mineral exploration and Mining.

== Establishment ==
DOGAMI was established in 1937 by the Oregon Legislative Assembly and placed under the direction of the State Geologist, an office established in 1872 and first held by pioneer Congregational missionary and fossil expert Thomas Condon.

“In prying apart the stone layers of the rocks, the scientist is, in reality, opening the leaves of the past history of our world.” Thomas Condon, 1902.

== Maps, data, and other publications ==
The department releases the results of its geologic studies in several formats including: CD-ROM disks, computer files, and publications such as maps, books, open file reports, special papers, and brochures. All of this is made available to the public at the Nature of the Northwest Information Center at the state office building in Portland, Oregon.

== Hazards ==
In the Pacific Northwest, natural geologic catastrophes may be placed into five categories: floods, landslides, earthquakes, volcanic eruptions, and tsunamis. All five of these catastrophes have occurred in Oregon within the past century. Quite often the effect of two or more events occurring simultaneously greatly accentuates the destructiveness of the episode. Floods are nearly always accompanied by landslides, mudflows are often a significant part of volcanic activity, and a major quake following a flood results in a multitude of large and small landslides. Earthquakes in coastal areas frequently precede tsunamis.

The department also offers extensive information regarding hazards such as earthquakes and other natural hazards in the Pacific Northwest. They're categorized as follows: Earthquakes, Landslides, and debris flows, Volcanic eruption, geologic hazards on the Oregon Coast, as well as other guides and information regarding risk from natural hazards, emergency management, and resource guides.

== Permits - Mineral Land Regulation & Reclamation ==
=== Surface Mining Permitting Process ===
==== Operating Permit ====
An Operating Permit is required for mining operations with an activity level that exceeds one acre and/or 5,000 cubic yards of new disturbance in any 12-month period, unless the excavated material stays on the property.

- Quantity restrictions – none (within the permitted area).
- Mine reclamation is required
- The permit is renewed annually until mining and reclamation are complete. The renewal fee is based on production.

Operating Permit Application Requirements:

- Application Fee
- Completed Application
- Proof of Land Ownership
- Mine reclamation Plan
- Site Plan Map
- Location Map
- Reclamation security (amount is site specific)
- Land survey

Additional information may be required for sites on floodplains, in hydrologically sensitive areas, or on steep slopes.

There is a 35-day comment period. The application is reviewed for completeness, a site visit is scheduled. The application is reviewed for adequacy to determine if there are deficiencies. (Deficiencies are addressed as draft permit conditions.) The application materials, along with a report and draft permit conditions, will be sent to the other natural resource agencies for review. There is a 35-day comment period allowed for a response. Comments received from agencies are addressed and a reclamation bond amount is calculated. At the end of the 35 days, the permit is eligible to be issued.

The permit must be renewed every year until mining and reclamation are complete. The permit renewal fee is based on the number of tons mined during the permitted year.

==== Exploration Permit ====
An Exploration Permit is required for operations that disturb more than one surface acre or involves drilling to greater than 50 feet.

- Reclamation is required.
- The permit is renewed annually until exploration activity and reclamation are complete.

Upon receipt of a complete exploration application, other natural resource agencies are notified and have at least 21 days in which to comment.

=== Oil & Gas Permitting Process ===
To obtain a permit to drill an oil or gas well, the following items must be submitted to the Department of Geology's Mineral Land Regulation & Reclamation office:

- A completed application form.
- Application fee (see Oil & Gas Fee Schedule).
- A drilling bond (amount based on depth of well).
- Evidence of mineral rights ownership or lease.
- New operators: an organization report giving information on the individual, the partnership, or the corporation.
- A plan of operation to include information on logging, coring, testing, directional surveys, directional drilling, and any other planned procedures.
- A plat of the drilling pad showing the slope of natural contours and the location of the mud sump with respect to cut/fill. Dimensions of these items is to be indicated on the plat.

The application is reviewed for completeness and then proposed permit conditions are sent, with the application materials, to the other natural resource agencies for their review.

Other natural resource agencies have a 45-day comment period for review of the application and to respond.

- Reclamation security must be submitted before the permit can be issued.
- The purpose of the reclamation security is to insure that reclamation is completed.

The permit must be renewed every year until reclamation is complete.
