= Outline of the Cascade Range =

Mountain range in western North America

The following outline is provided as an overview of and topical guide to the Cascade Range:

The Cascade Range, or Cascades, is a major mountain range of western North America, extending from southern British Columbia through Washington and Oregon to Northern California. It includes both non-volcanic mountains, such as many of those in the North Cascades, and the notable volcanoes known as the High Cascades. The small part of the range in British Columbia is referred to as the Canadian Cascades or, locally, as the Cascade Mountains. The highest peak in the range is Mount Rainier in Washington at 14,411 feet (4,392 m).

The Cascades are part of the Pacific Ocean's Ring of Fire, the ring of volcanoes and associated mountains around the Pacific Ocean. All of the eruptions in the contiguous United States over the last 200 years have been from the Cascade Volcanoes. The two most recent were Lassen Peak from 1914 to 1921 and a major eruption of Mount St. Helens in 1980. Minor eruptions of Mount St. Helens have also occurred since, most recently from 2004 to 2008. The Cascade Range is a part of the American Cordillera, a nearly continuous chain of mountain ranges (cordillera) that form the western "backbone" of North, Central, and South America.

This article contains a list of volcanoes and a list of protected areas associated with the Cascade Range (northern portion of the Sierra Nevada range and east of the West Coast and Pacific Ocean, and west of the Canadian Rockies / Rocky Mountains chain) of the Pacific Northwest region of the Western United States, on the continent of North America.

== Volcanoes ==
Volcanoes south of the Fraser River in the Cascade Volcanic Arc (a geological term) belong to the Cascade Range (a geographic term). Peaks are listed north to south.

=== North Cascades ===
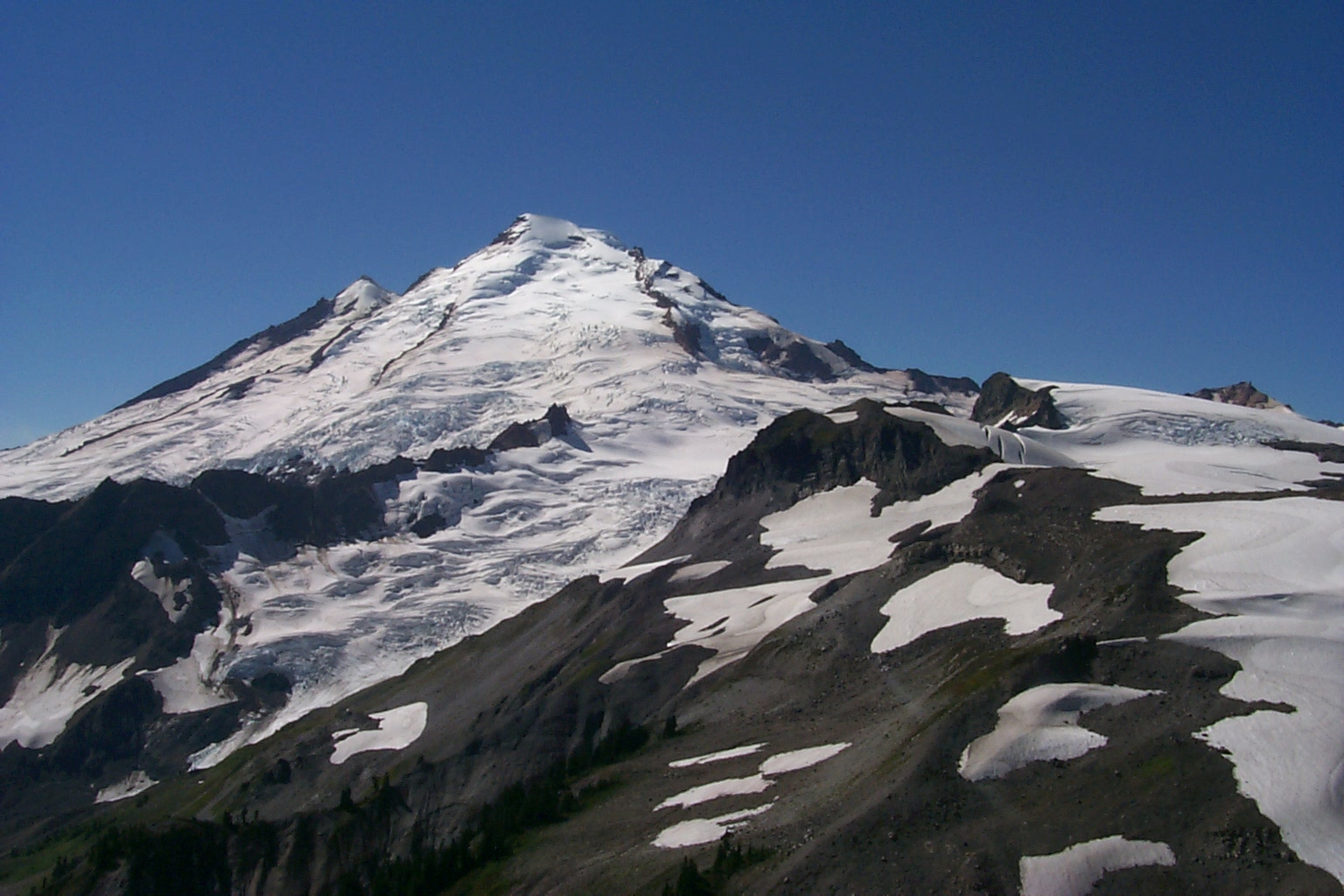
Mount Baker

- Coquihalla Mountain (southern British Columbia) — highest peak in the Bedded Range. It is a major preserved stratovolcano in the Pemberton Volcanic Belt, an extinct portion of the Canadian Cascade Arc.
- Mount Baker (Near the United States-Canada border) — highest peak in northern Washington. It is an active volcano. Steam activity from its crater occurs relatively frequently. Mount Baker is one of the snowiest places on Earth; in 1999 the ski area (on a subsidiary peak) recorded the world's greatest single-season snowfall: 1,140 in (29,000 mm).
- Glacier Peak (northern Washington) — secluded and relatively inaccessible peak. Contrary to its name, its glacial cover is not that extensive. The volcano is surprisingly small in volume, and gets most of its height by having grown atop a nonvolcanic ridge.

=== High Cascades ===
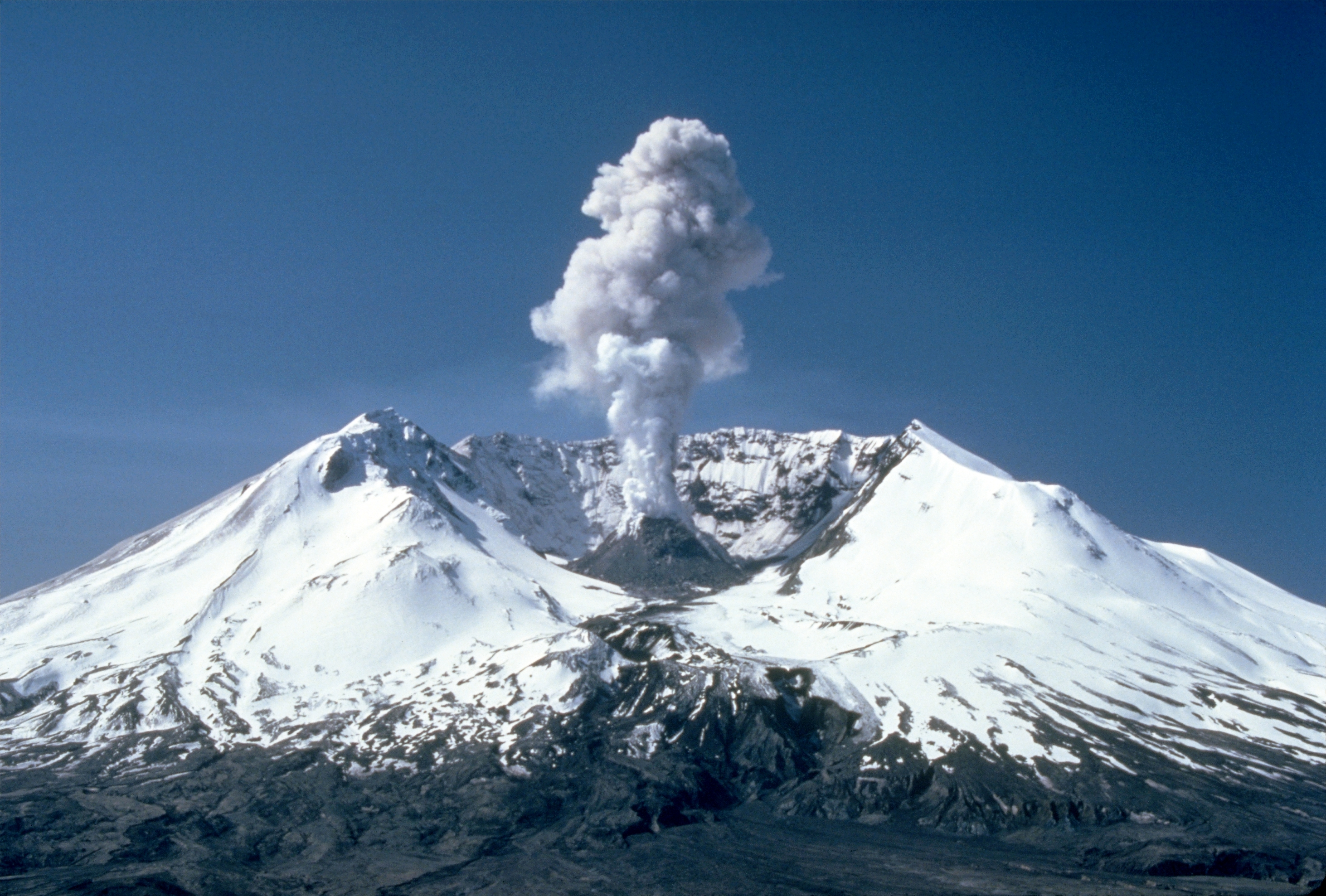
1982 minor eruption of Mount St. Helens

- Mount Rainier (southeast of Tacoma, Washington) — highest peak in the Cascades, it dominates the surrounding landscape. There is no other higher peak northward until the Yukon-Alaska-BC border apex beyond the Alsek River.
- Mount St. Helens (southern Washington) — Erupted in 1980, leveling forests to the north of the mountain and sending ash across the northwest. The northern part of the mountain was destroyed in the blast (1980 Mount St. Helens eruption).
- Mount Adams (east of Mount St. Helens) — the second highest peak in Washington and third highest in the Cascade Range.
- Mount Hood (northern Oregon) — the highest peak in Oregon and arguably the most frequently climbed major peak in the Cascades.
- Mount Jefferson (northcentral Oregon) — the second highest peak in Oregon.
- Three Fingered Jack (northcentral Oregon) — Highly eroded Pleistocene volcano.
- Mount Washington (between Santiam and McKenzie passes) — a highly eroded shield volcano.
- Three Sisters (near the city of Bend, Oregon) — South Sister is the highest and youngest, with a well-defined crater. Middle Sister is more pyramidal and eroded. North Sister is the oldest and has a crumbling rock pinnacle.
- Broken Top (to the southeast of South Sister) — a highly eroded extinct stratovolcano. Contains Bend and Crook Glaciers.
- Newberry Volcano — isolated caldera with two crater lakes. Very variable lavas. Flows from here have reached the city of Bend.
- Mount Bachelor (near Three Sisters) — a geologically young (less than 15,000 years) shield-to-stratovolcano which is now the site of a popular ski resort. (Mt. Bachelor ski area)
- Diamond Peak (south of Willamette Pass) — a 8,744 ft (2,665 m) volcano composed of 15 km^{3} (3.6 cu mi) of basaltic andesite.
- Mount Bailey (north of Mount Mazama)
- Mount Thielsen (east of Mount Bailey) — highly eroded volcano with a prominent spire, making it the Lightning Rod of the Cascades.
- Mount Mazama (southern Oregon) — better known for its Crater Lake, which is a caldera formed by a catastrophic eruption which took out most of the summit roughly 6,900 years ago. Mount Mazama is estimated to have been about 11,000 ft (3,400 m) elevation prior to the blast.
- Mount Scott (southern Oregon) — on the southeastern flank of Crater Lake. At 8,929 ft (2,722 m) elevation, this small stratovolcano is the highest peak in Crater Lake National Park.
- Mount McLoughlin (near Klamath Falls, Oregon) — presents a symmetrical appearance when viewed from Klamath Lake.
- Medicine Lake Volcano — a shield volcano in northern California which is the largest volcano by volume in the Cascades.
- Mount Shasta (northern California) — second highest peak in the Cascades. Can be seen in the Sacramento Valley as far as 140 mi (230 km) away, as it is a dominating feature of the region.
- Lassen Peak (south of Mount Shasta) — southernmost volcano in the Cascades and the most easily climbed peak in the Cascades. It erupted from 1914 to 1921, and like Mount Shasta, it too can be seen in the Sacramento Valley, up to 120 mi (190 km) away. Lowest Peak because the Cascades extend from it.
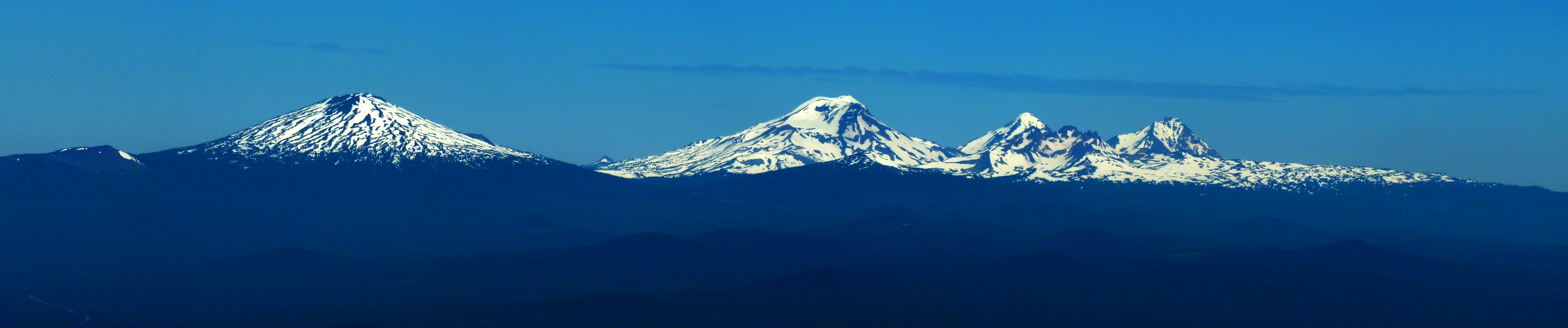
Mt. Bachelor, Broken Top, and The Three Sisters.

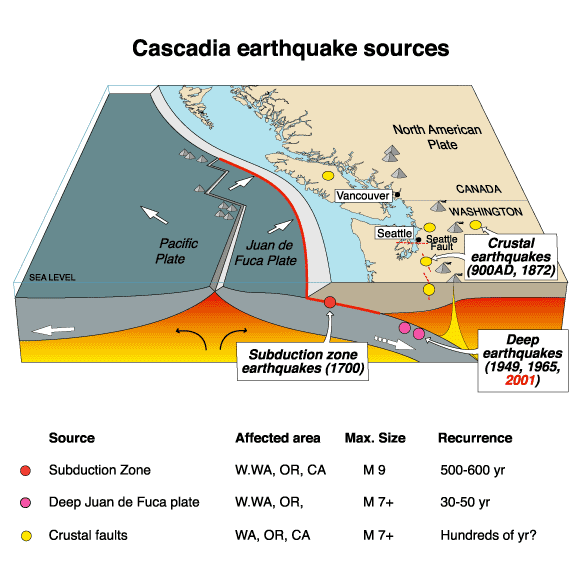

== Protected areas ==
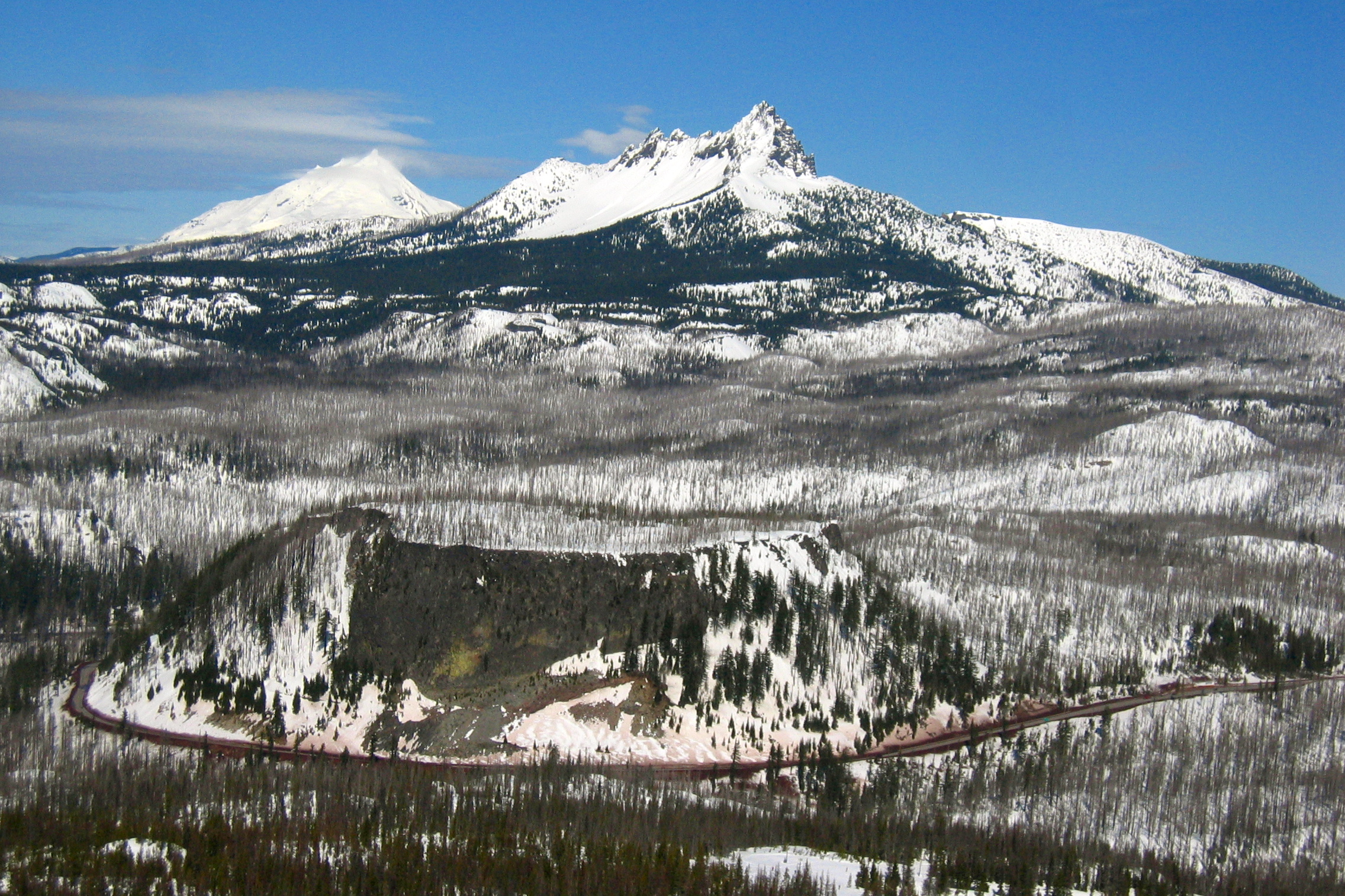
Three Fingered Jack and Santiam Pass, Oregon

There are four U.S. National Parks in the Cascade Range, one National Scenic Area, and many U.S. National Monuments, U.S. Wilderness Areas, and U.S. National Forests. Each classification protects the various glaciers, volcanoes, geothermal fields, rivers, lakes, forests, and wildlife to varying degrees.

=== National parks ===
- Lassen Volcanic National Park was established in 1916 while its namesake peak was erupting. The park includes the most extensive and active thermal areas in the United States outside Yellowstone National Park.
- Crater Lake National Park preserves the remains of Mount Mazama, a large volcano that imploded thousands of years ago, forming a caldera that was later filled with rain and ground water, later to be known as Crater Lake.
- Mount Rainier National Park surrounds the Cascades' highest volcano, Mount Rainier, which in turn is covered by the largest glacier system in the United States south of Alaska.
- North Cascades National Park was carved out of a primitive part of the range composed of ancient metamorphic and sedimentary rock. Mount Baker and Glacier Peak are nearby.

=== National Scenic Areas ===
- Columbia River Gorge National Scenic Area

=== National monuments ===
- Mount St. Helens National Volcanic Monument was formed following the 1980 eruption of Mount St. Helens in order to preserve the devastated area and give scientists a chance to study its recovery.
- Newberry National Volcanic Monument includes the area around Newberry Volcano in central Oregon.
- Cascade–Siskiyou National Monument is located in southern Oregon at the junction of the Cascades and the Siskiyou Mountains.
- Lava Beds National Monument in California lies on the northeast flank of the Medicine Lake Volcano and is the site of the largest concentration of lava tubes in the United States.

=== Provincial Parks ===
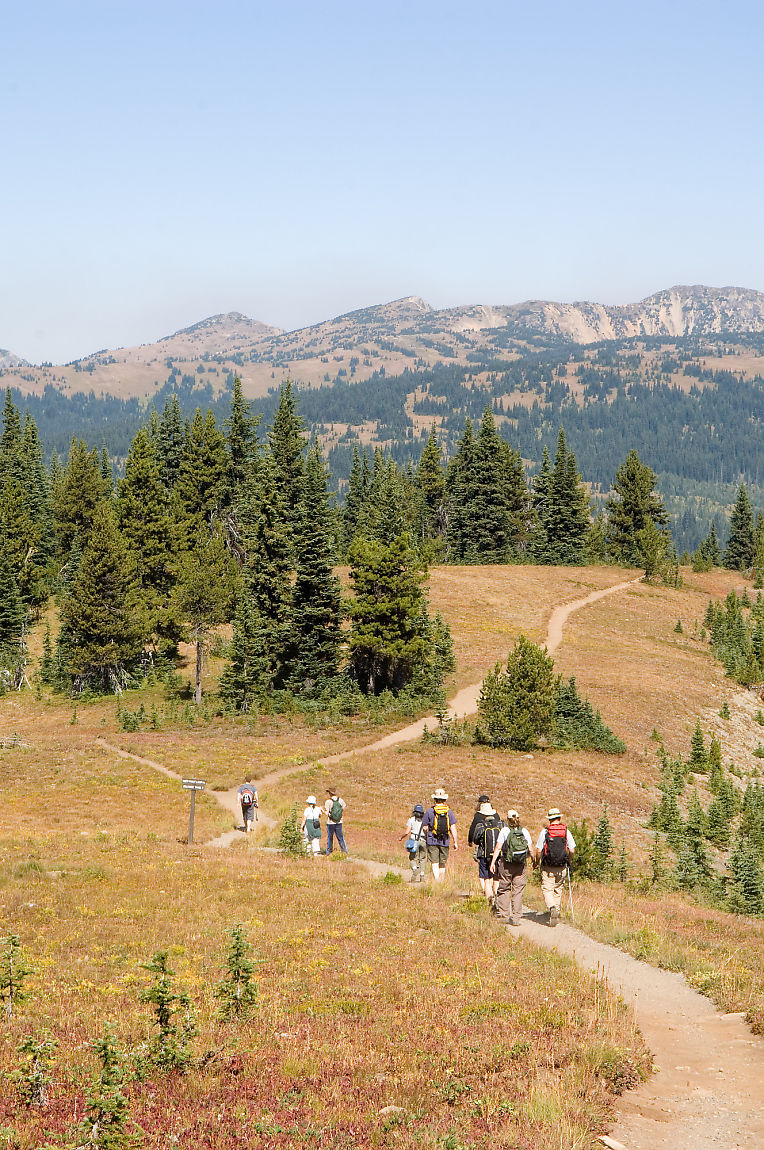
E. C. Manning Provincial Park

- Skagit Valley Provincial Park
- E. C. Manning Provincial Park
- Cascade Recreation Area
- Cathedral Provincial Park and Protected Area
- Coquihalla Canyon Provincial Park
- Chilliwack Lake Provincial Park
- Coquihalla Summit Recreation Area
- Silver Lake Provincial Park
- Nicolum River Provincial Park
- Skihist Provincial Park
- Bridal Veil Falls Provincial Park
- Cultus Lake Provincial Park

=== Wilderness areas ===
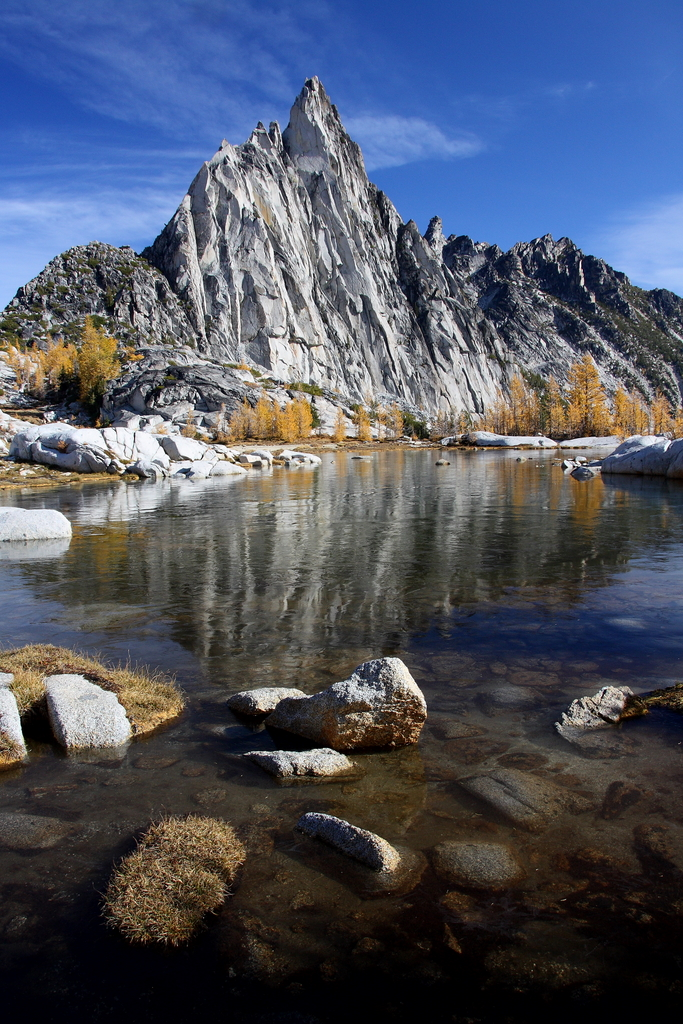
Gnome tarn, The Enchantments, Alpine Lakes Wilderness

- Wenatchee National Forest Wilderness Areas
  - Alpine Lakes Wilderness
  - Glacier Peak Wilderness
  - Henry M. Jackson Wilderness
  - Lake Chelan-Sawtooth Wilderness
  - Norse Peak Wilderness
  - William O. Douglas Wilderness
  - Goat Rocks Wilderness
- Gifford Pinchot National Forest Wilderness Areas
  - Goat Rocks Wilderness
  - Tatoosh Wilderness
  - Mount Adams Wilderness
  - Indian Heaven Wilderness
  - Trapper Creek Wilderness
  - William O. Douglas Wilderness
- Mount Baker-Snoqualmie National Forest Wilderness Areas
  - Alpine Lakes Wilderness
  - Boulder River Wilderness
  - Clearwater Wilderness
  - Glacier Peak Wilderness
  - Henry M. Jackson Wilderness
  - Mount Baker Wilderness
  - Noisy-Diobsud Wilderness
  - Norse Peak Wilderness
  - Wild Sky Wilderness
- Mount Hood National Forest Wilderness Areas
  - Badger Creek Wilderness
  - Bull of the Woods Wilderness
  - Mark O. Hatfield Wilderness
  - Mount Hood Wilderness
  - Salmon–Huckleberry Wilderness
- Deschutes National Forest Wilderness Areas
  - Diamond Peak Wilderness
  - Mount Jefferson Wilderness
  - Mount Thielsen Wilderness
  - Mount Washington Wilderness
  - Three Sisters Wilderness
- Willamette National Forest Wilderness Areas
  - Opal Creek Wilderness
  - Middle Santiam Wilderness
  - Menagerie Wilderness
  - Waldo Lake Wilderness
- Umpqua National Forest Wilderness Areas
  - Boulder Creek Wilderness
- Rogue River – Siskiyou National Forest Wilderness Areas
  - Sky Lakes Wilderness
  - Rogue–Umpqua Divide Wilderness
- Fremont–Winema National Forests Wilderness Areas
  - Mountain Lakes Wilderness
- Shasta-Trinity National Forest Wilderness Areas
  - Mount Shasta Wilderness
- Lassen National Forest Wilderness Areas
  - Caribou Wilderness
  - Ishi Wilderness
  - Thousand Lakes Wilderness

== Natural history ==
- Cascades Ecoregion
- Ecology of the North Cascades
- Flora of the Cascade Range
