= Broken Top =

Glacially eroded stratovolcano in the US State of Oregon

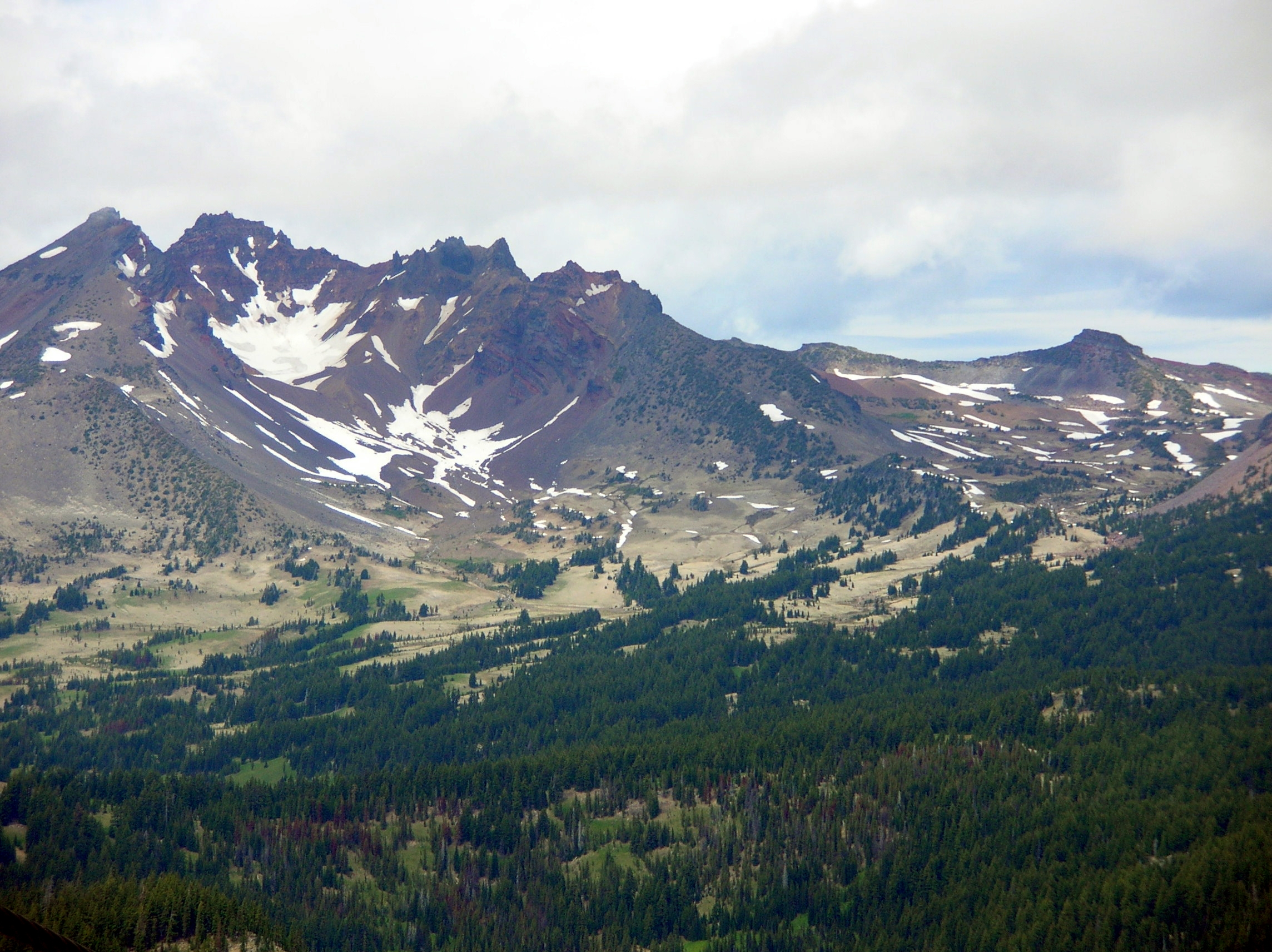

Highest point
- Elevation: 9,177 ft (2,797 m) NAVD 88
- Coordinates: 44°04′58″N 121°41′59″W

Geography
- Location: Deschutes County, Oregon, U.S.
- Parent range: Cascade Range
- Topo map: USGS Broken Top

Geology
- Rock age: Pleistocene
- Mountain type: Stratovolcano
- Volcanic arc: Cascade Volcanic Arc
- Last eruption: About 100,000 years ago

Broken Top is a glacially eroded complex stratovolcano. It lies in the Cascade Volcanic Arc, part of the extensive Cascade Range in the U.S. state of Oregon. Located southeast of the Three Sisters peaks, the volcano, residing within the Three Sisters Wilderness, is 20 miles (32 km) west of Bend, Oregon, in Deschutes County. Eruptive activity stopped roughly 100,000 years ago, and erosion by glaciers has since reduced the volcano's cone to where its contents are exposed. There are two named glaciers on the peak, Bend and Crook Glacier.

Diverse species of flora and fauna inhabit the area, which is subject to frequent snowfall, occasional rain, and extreme temperature variation between seasons. Broken Top and its surrounding area constitute popular destinations for hiking, climbing, and scrambling.

== Geography ==
Broken Top lies in the Cascade Volcanic Arc, roughly located at 44.08°N 121.70°W. It is part of the Cascade Range in Oregon, in the Three Sisters Wilderness, which lies in Deschutes County. The mountain has an elevation of 2,797 metres (9,177 ft) according to Hildreth (2007).

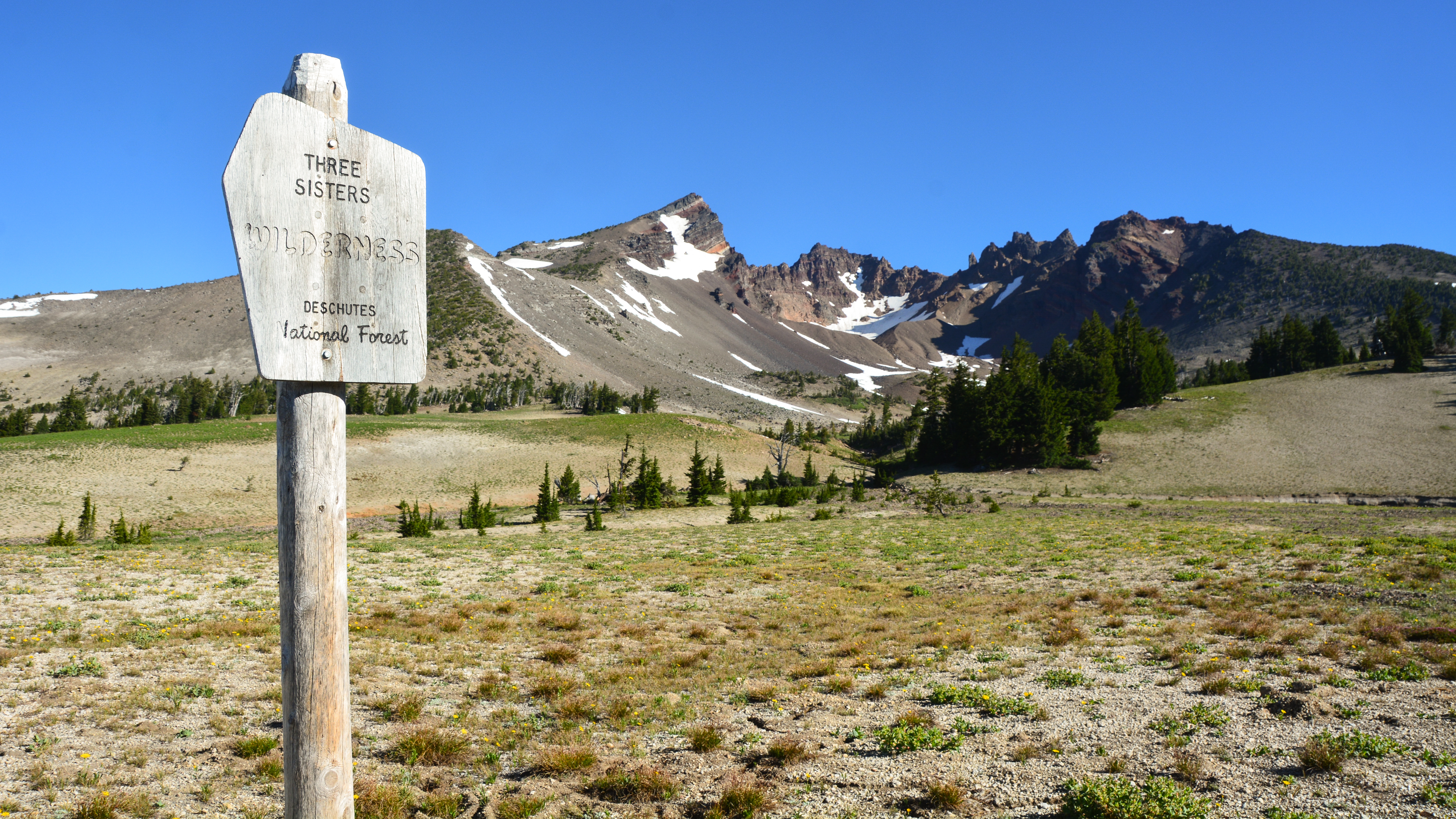
Wilderness boundary on the south side of Broken Top

=== Wilderness ===
The Three Sisters Wilderness covers an area of 281,190 acres (1,137.9 km^{2}), making it the second-largest wilderness area in Oregon, after the Eagle Cap Wilderness area. Designated by the United States Congress in 1964, it borders the Mount Washington Wilderness to the north and shares its southern edge with the Waldo Lake Wilderness. The area includes 260 miles (420 km) of trails and many forests, lakes, waterfalls, and streams, including the source of Whychus Creek. The Three Sisters and Broken Top account for about a third of the Three Sisters Wilderness, and this area is known as the Alpine Crest Region. Rising from about 5,200 feet (1,600 m) to 10,358 feet (3,157 m) in elevation, the Alpine Crest Region features the wilderness area's most-frequented glaciers, lakes, and meadows.

=== Physical geography ===
Weather varies greatly in the area due to the rain shadow caused by the Cascade Range. Air from the Pacific Ocean rises over the western slopes, which causes it to cool and dump its moisture as rain (or snow in the winter). Precipitation increases with elevation. Once the moisture is wrung from the air, it descends on the eastern side of the crest, which causes the air to be warmer and drier. On the western slopes, precipitation ranges from 80 to 125 inches (200 to 320 cm) annually, while precipitation over the eastern slopes varies from 40 to 80 inches (100 to 200 cm) in the east. Temperature extremes reach 80 to 90 °F (27 to 32 °C) in summers and −20 to −30 °F (−29 to −34 °C) during the winters.

Before non-indigenous settlement of the area at the end of the 19th century, wildfires frequently burned through the local forests, especially the ponderosa pine forests on the eastern slopes. Due to fire suppression over the past century the forests have become overgrown, and at higher elevations they are further susceptible to summertime fires, which threaten surrounding life and property. In the 21st century, wildfires have been larger and more common in the Deschutes National Forest. In September 2012, a lightning strike caused a fire that burned 41 square miles (110 km^{2}) in the Pole Creek area within the Three Sisters Wilderness, leaving the area closed until May 2013. In August 2017, officials closed 417 square miles (1,080 km^{2}) in the western half of the Three Sisters Wilderness, including 24 miles (39 km) of the Pacific Crest Trail, to the public because of 11 lightning-caused fires, including the Milli Fire. As a result of the increasing incidence of fires, public officials have factored the role of wildfire into planning, including organizing prescribed fires with scientists to protect habitats at risk while minimizing adverse effects on air quality and environmental health.

== Geology ==
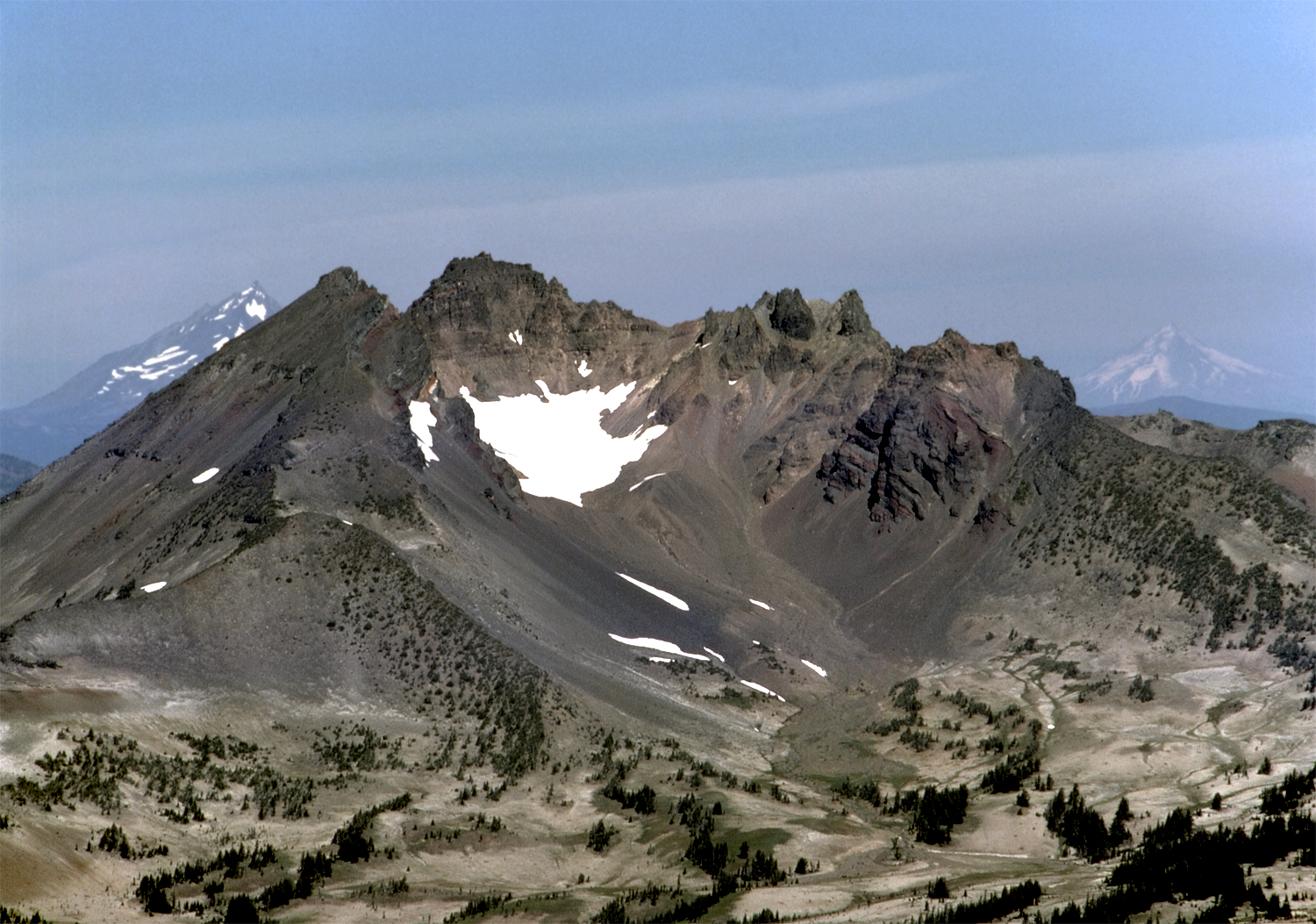
Broken Top as seen from Mount Bachelor, with Mount Jefferson on the left and Mount Hood on the right.

Broken Top is a complex stratovolcano. It lies northwest of Ball Butte and southeast of South Sister (part of the Three Sisters complex volcano), which is located at longitude 121.7° W and latitude 44.08° N. It has an elevation of 9,186 feet (2,800 m), with a volume of 2.4 cubic miles (10 km^{3}). Like other Cascade volcanoes, Broken Top was fed by magma chambers produced by the subduction of the Juan de Fuca tectonic plate under the western edge of the North American tectonic plate. The mountain was also shaped by the changing climate of the Pleistocene Epoch, during which multiple glacial periods occurred and glacial advance eroded local mountains.

Broken Top joins several other volcanoes in the eastern segment of the Cascade Range known as the High Cascades, which trends from north–south. This includes the Three Sisters complex, Belknap Crater, Mount Washington, Black Butte, and Three Fingered Jack, and Mount Bachelor. Constructed towards the end of the Pleistocene epoch, these mountains are underlain by more ancient volcanoes that sank within parallel north–south trending faults in the surrounding region. The Three Sisters form the centerpiece of a region of closely grouped volcanic peaks, an exception to the typical 40-to-60-mile (64 to 97 km) spacing between volcanoes elsewhere in the Cascades. This vicinity is among the most active volcanic areas in the Cascades and one of the most densely populated volcanic centers in the world, as well as the second largest volcanic field of silicic rock within the Quaternary Cascades. The 193 square miles (500 km^{2}) area from the Three Sisters to Broken Top and Mount Bachelor features at least 50 eruptive vents for rhyolitic and rhyodacitic lava.

East of Broken Top, the c, a 115.8 square miles (300 km^{2}) area of andesitic and mafic scoria cones, features similarly rhyolitic and rhyodacitic lava deposits. The Tumalo volcano spread ignimbrites and plinian deposits in ground eruptions across the area (Plinian eruptions are similar to the eruption of Vesuvius that destroyed Pompeii). These deposits spread from Tumalo to the town of Bend.

=== Eruptive history ===
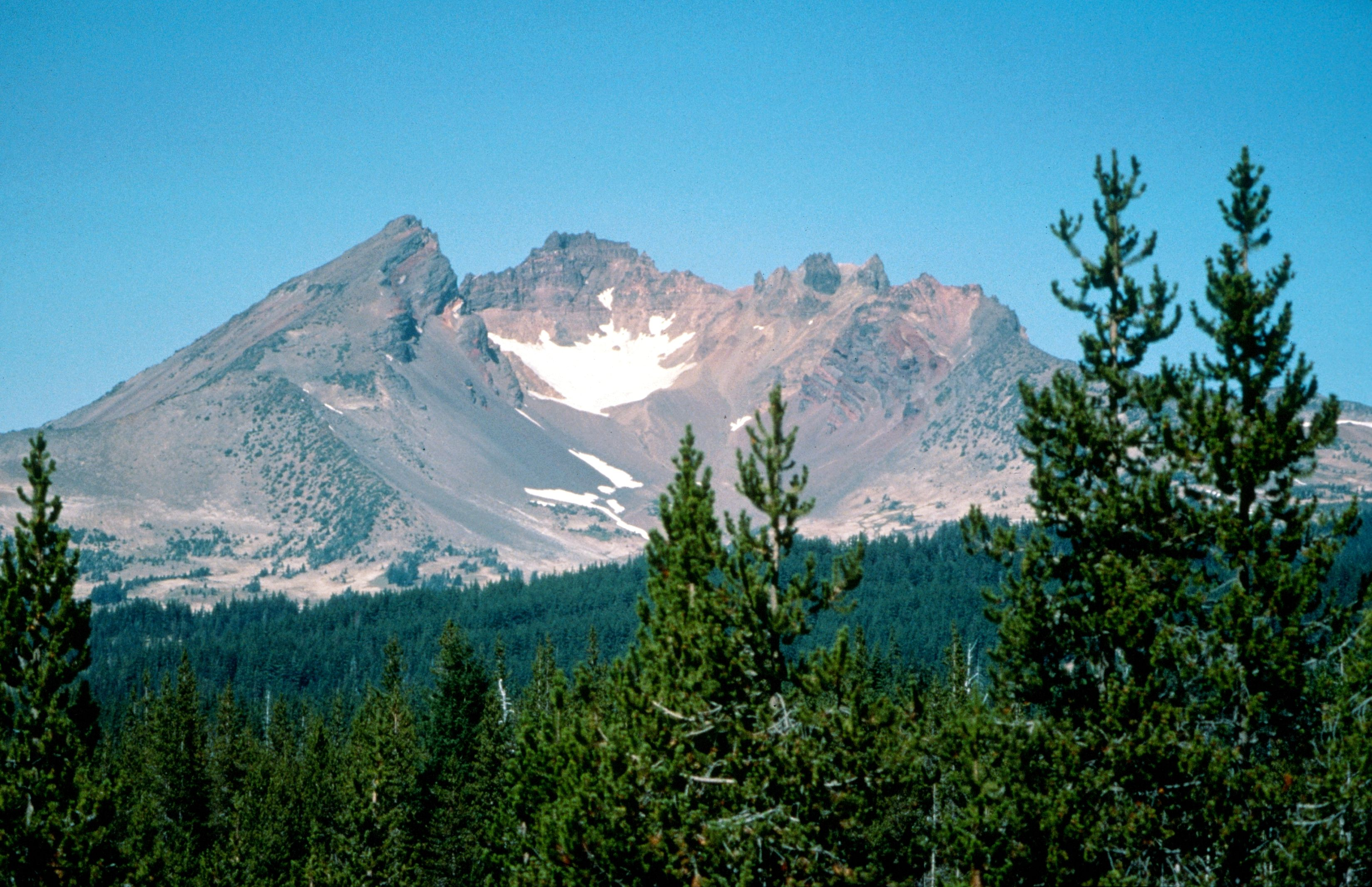
Broken Top, with its eroded crater

Broken Top's initial eruptions, beginning about 300,000 years ago during the middle of the Pleistocene epoch and overlapping with eruptions at the North Sister volcano, consisted of basaltic andesite lava that contributed to a base shield. The center of this edifice consists of oxidized agglomerate that was invaded by intrusive dikes and geologic sills. The scoria, dike rocks, and lava that comprised this cone had a uniform composition made up of phenocrysts with plagioclase, olivine, two types of pyroxene, and magnetite. Erratic eruptions continued afterward, erupting silicic lava off and on until 150,000 years ago, including pyroxene andesites that lacked olivine, as well as obsidian, which was rare among local volcanoes during that time period. Much of the current cone is occupied by flows from eruptions of mafic lava (rich in magnesium and iron) including andesite, dacite, rhyodacite, and pyroclastic flows. These deposits extend from the subordinate volcano to the summit, and reach Todd Lake Volcano as well as rhyodacitic lava at Tam MacArthur rim and Whychus Creek Falls. Another set of rhyodacitic lava domes runs for 6.2 miles (10 km) from south of Broken Top to Demaris Lake to its north, but they were partially covered by andesitic deposits from eruptions at the South Sister volcano. In total, throughout its 150,000 years of eruptive activity, Broken Top erupted between 1.7 to 2.4 cubic miles (7 to 10 km^{3}) of lava. Though most of the material that forms Broken Top's volcanic cone originated from its main vent, the edifice was also built up by auxiliary vents on its flanks and parasitic cones that surrounded the main edifice. The side vents erupted to form fissure vents, producing basalt and andesite, while the parasitic vents erupted scoria.

Broken Top's volcanic crater, now 0.50 miles (0.8 km) in diameter, was most likely created through subsidence, which created a depression that was filled with thick basaltic andesite lava flows topped by thin lavas. Once the volcano's central conduit congealed, it underwent hydrothermal alteration over time, which has been revealed by several cirques.^{[a]} The summit cone has also undergone extensive glacial erosion, with embayments and a major cirque on its southern side. It forms an amphitheatre shape that opens to the southeast. Due to this extensive erosion, the contents of Broken Top's cone are exposed, which allows volcanologists to classify Broken Top as a complex stratovolcano. Erosion has destroyed the original summit of the mountain, along with its southeastern slope and much of the volcano's interior, revealing purple, red, and black scoria layers that alternate with yellow, brown, and orange pumice and tuffs, along with white pumice interbedded in a matrix with black lava fragments.

=== Glaciation and flash floods ===
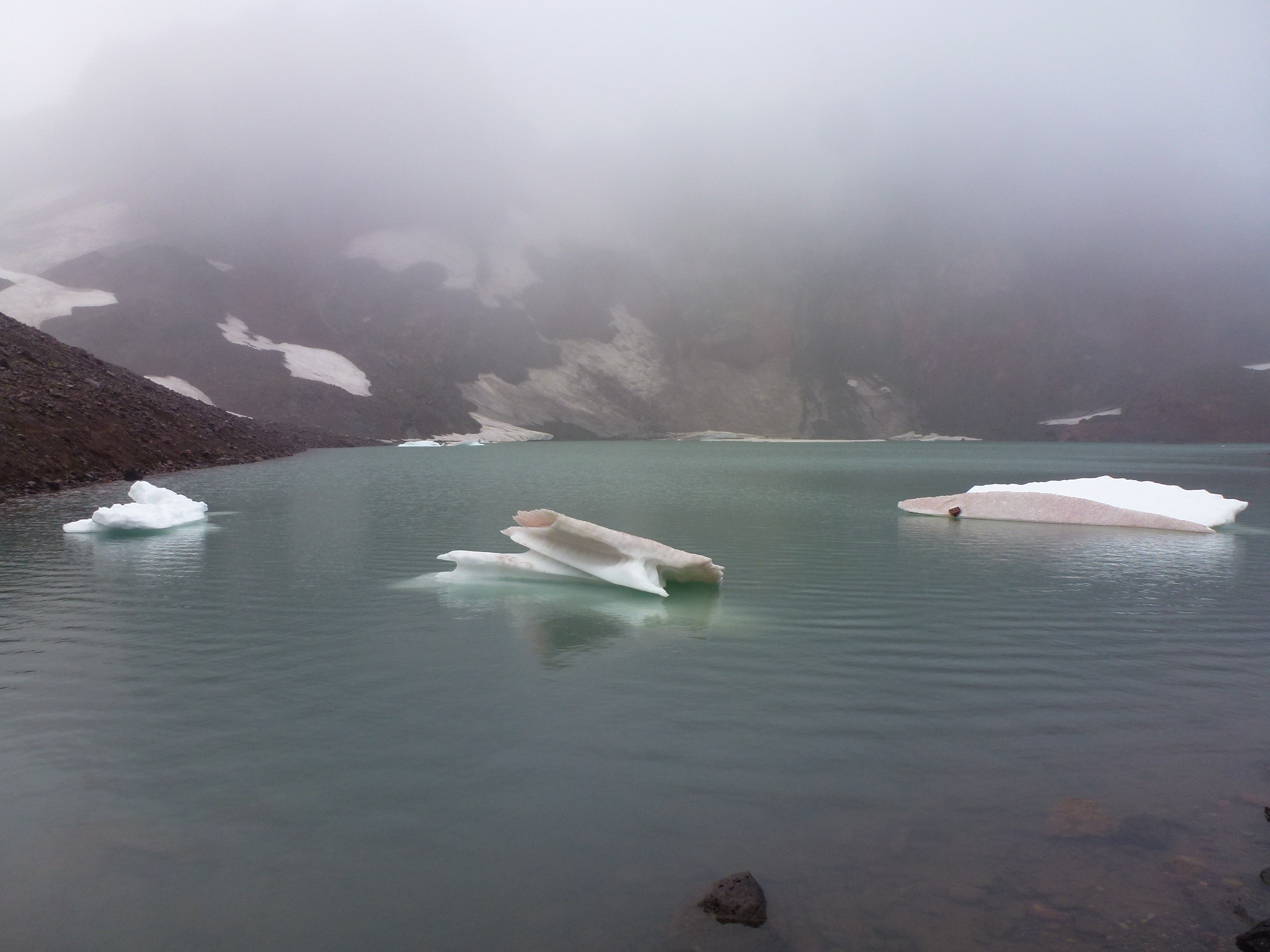
Icebergs in a small, unnamed glacial lake near the summit of Broken Top.

During the late Pleistocene, Broken Top and its surroundings were almost entirely covered by glaciers. The only features in the area not buried by glaciers were the summit of Tumalo Mountain and the summit of Broken Top, including the northwest ridge crest. No geologic evidence suggests that any eruptive activity took place subglacially.

Currently, the Bend and Crook glaciers, located at elevations of 7,762 feet (2,366 m) and 8,209 feet (2,502 m), respectively, continue to erode the mountain's interior contents. Both small ice streams, they have decreased significantly in size over the past few decades, and retreat continues at a rapid rate. The pace of glacial retreat from Broken Top's glaciers are reported to be the highest among Oregon Cascade Range glaciers, at over 11% per year. This is up from around 1.9% in annual loss in prior measurements.

When Little Ice Age glaciers retreated during the 20th century, water filled in the spaces left behind, forming moraine-dammed lakes, which are more common in the Three Sisters Wilderness than anywhere else in the contiguous United States. The local area has a history of flash floods, including at Broken Top itself, where a flash flood took place on October 7, 1966. Analysis of the event by forest ranger David Rasmussen determined that it had originated from a lake on Broken Top, located at an elevation of 8,000 feet (2,400 m) with an area of 11 acres (0.045 km^{2}). This lake sits at the foot of Crook Glacier and is fed by Bend Glacier. The event was likely initiated by glacial ice that fell into the lake, spawning a large wave that breached the moraine and drained 50,000,000 US gallons (190,000,000 L) of water into a channel underneath the lake. The resulting flood reached depths of 10–15 feet (3.0–4.6 m), cascading down the eastern and southern flanks of the mountain and reaching the Cascade Lakes Scenic Byway. The flood moved logs, rocks, and mud to the Sparks Lake meadow basin; it covered between 35 and 45 percent of the lake's basin with silt and deposited at least 10,000–20,000 short tons (9,100–18,100 t) of sediment in the lake and surrounding meadow.

=== Additional cones ===
Todd Lake volcano, which erupted porphyritic andesite (andesite with distinct differences among its crystal size) with a pale gray color, sits at Broken Top's southern foot. Its lava flows have been exposed and are covered with red scoria and agglutinate from a separate volcanic vent. It began to erupt as Broken Top stopped eruptive activity, since the two have overlapping layers of lava.

As Pleistocene glaciers retreated, basaltic cinder cone volcanoes formed south of Todd Lake right as Cayuse Crater was forming. Cayuse Crater, an unrelated postglacial volcano which formed 11,000 years ago, also sits on Broken Top's southern flank. It is made up of basaltic lava and scoria that erupted after Broken Top ceased activity, suggesting that it formed due to an underlying magma chamber closer to South Sister. Cayuse Crater also consists partly of yellow lapilli tuff and tuff breccia. It has a double rim, its southern wall having been breached by lava flows, with two additional smaller cones, about 30–40 feet (9.1–12.2 m) in elevation, to the northwest. More recent Holocene activity on the volcano's flanks constructed basaltic lava flows, cones, and ash that have become interbedded with moraine and material from outwash plains from the Neoglacial period.

Ball Butte refers to an additional cone, 8,091 feet (2,466 m) in elevation, which is considered one of Broken Top's subfeatures. There are also a number of parasitic cones in the area, which helped build Ball Butte over time. They also produced much red scoria and formed hot springs and fumaroles (openings in the earth that emit steam and gases). The remnants of a large scoria cone near Bend Glacier, for the most part destroyed by ice, include volcanic bombs that extend up to 8 feet (2.4 m) in length.

During the late Pleistocene, six cinder cone and auxiliary vents between Broken Top and Tumalo Mountain erupted, yielding glomeroporphyritic basaltic andesite. They all likely derived from the same magma source.

=== Recent history and potential hazards ===
When the first geological reconnaissance of the surrounding region was published in 1925, its author, Edwin T. Hodge, suggested that the Broken Top, the Three Sisters, and several other mountains in the area constituted the remains of an enormous collapsed volcano that had been active during the Miocene or early Pliocene epochs. Naming this ancient volcano Mount Multnomah, Hodge theorized that it had collapsed to form a caldera just as Mount Mazama collapsed to form Crater Lake. In the 1940s, Howel Williams completed an analysis of the vicinity and concluded that Multnomah had never existed, instead demonstrating that each volcano in the area possessed its own individual eruptive history. Williams' 1944 paper, titled "Volcanoes of the Three Sisters Region, Oregon Cascades", defined the basic outline of the region, though he lacked access to chemical techniques and radiometric dating. Oregon State University geologist and volcanologist Edward Taylor's analysis in 1978 determined that the current Broken Top cone was constructed on basaltic andesite lavas that built a platform. As dikes and sills invaded the edifice over time, it formed a volcanic cone made of different lavas including basaltic andesite, dacite, and rhyodacite, as well as tephra and pyroclastic materials from more explosive eruptions.

Broken Top poses significant hazards to the surrounding area, especially within the proximal hazard zone with a diameter of 12 miles (19 km) that surrounds Broken Top and the Three Sisters. A landslide at Broken Top, or an eruption from the nearby South Sister, could initiate a lahar (rapid flows of water, rock, and mud) that could cascade down river valleys in the surrounding area. While smaller landslides of less than 350,000,000 cubic feet (10,000,000 m^{3}) are more probable than huge avalanches, they can still cause significant damage and cause lahars. Larger landslide events would most likely be the result of magma intrusion, and thus they would be predicted by seismometers and volcanic surveying devices.

An eruption from South Sister would pose a threat to nearby life, as the proximal danger zone extends 1.2 to 6.2 miles (2 to 10 km) from the volcano's summits. During an eruption, tephra could accumulate to 1 to 2 inches (25 to 51 mm) in the city of Bend, and mudflows and pyroclastic flows could run down the sides of the mountain, threatening any life in their paths.

Over the course of the past century, five or more lahars have occurred at the Three Sisters and Broken Top, either as a result of glacier-outburst flooding or the failure of moraine-dammed lakes. However, these only affected undeveloped areas, as they extended less than roughly 6 miles (9.7 km) from their original source. Future dam failures leading to similar events would likely still only affect the proximal hazard zone with a diameter of 12 miles (19 km), but they might reach more distal areas if they originate from certain lakes, such as Carver Lake or the unnamed lake on the eastern side of Broken Top draining to Sparks Lake. Lakes with less threat of reaching the distal hazard zone include small lakes in the headwaters of Whychus Creek and the basin below Collier Glacier.

== Recreation ==
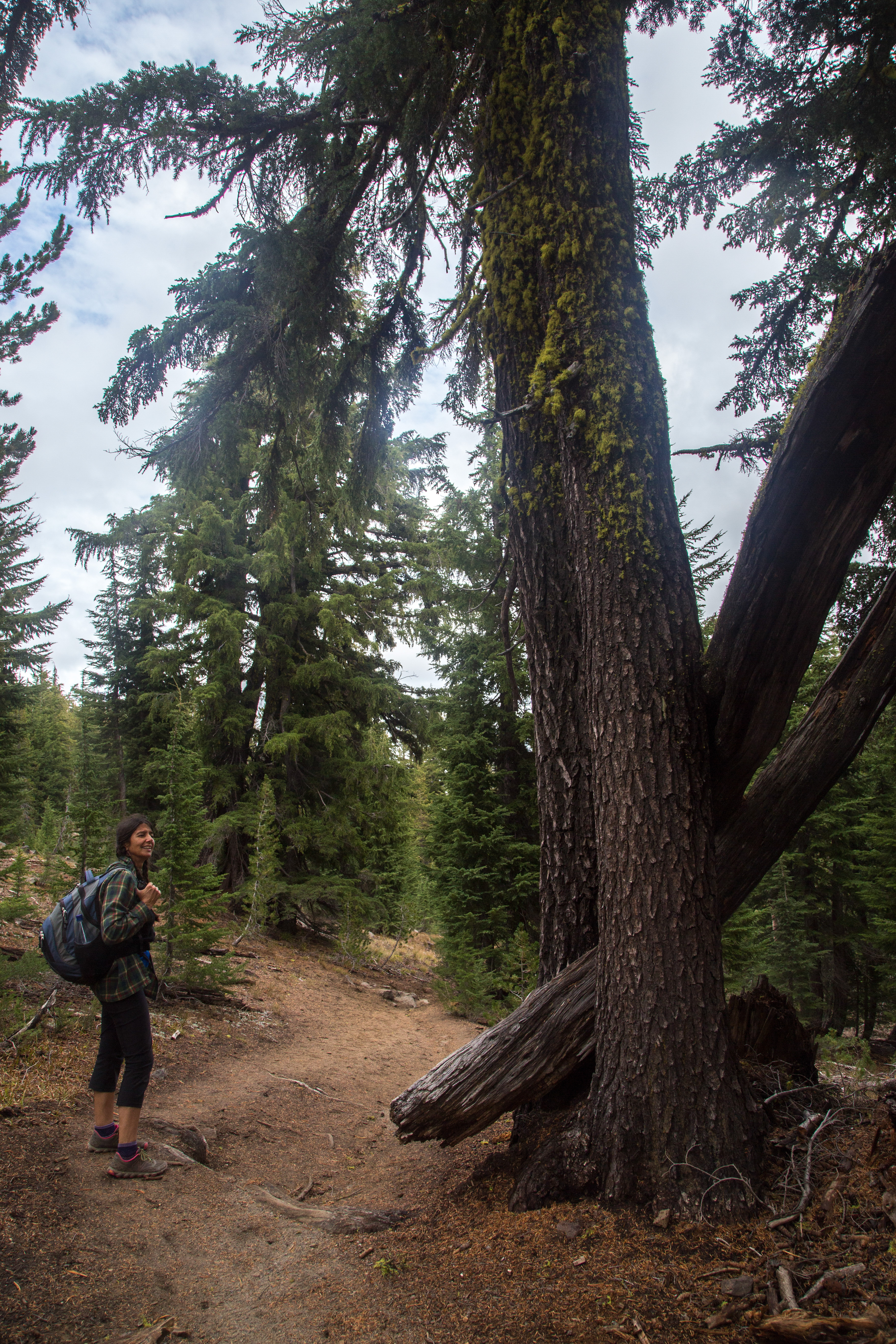
A hiker on the Tam McArthur Rim Trail to Broken Top in the Three Sisters Wilderness

Broken Top and the nearby Three Sisters represent a popular climbing destination for hikers and mountaineers. The United States Forest Service requires permits (of which a limited number are available) for use during the busier parts of the year, and dogs must be kept on leashes on the Green Lakes, Moraine Lakes, South Sister, Soda Creek, Todd Lake, and Crater Ditch trails from July 15 through September 15. Horses are prohibited, and ice axes are sensible during the winter climbing season for safety reasons. Motor vehicles and other mechanical means of transport such as bicycles, wagons, motorboats, and helicopters are generally prohibited within the Three Sisters Wilderness under the rules of the National Wilderness Preservation System.

The hiking trail on Broken Top begins at the Green Lakes Basin at the trailhead east of Bend, running 12 miles (19 km) and gaining 3,450 feet (1,050 m) in elevation. It can be scrambled, though the route demands Yosemite Decimal System class 4 or lower class 5 climbing and has significant exposure. The Broken Top trail begins at a junction with the Green Lakes Trail. It runs for 0.8 miles (1.3 km) to Crater Creek, including 0.5 miles (0.80 km) of trail that passes right by the volcano and Crook Glacier. There is also an unofficial trail that runs up the moraine of Crook Glacier. The northern slopes of Broken Top can be accessed by trailheads north of Tam McArthur Rim, while its southern slopes can be reached by trailheads near Crater Creek.

== See also ==
- Geology of the Pacific Northwest

== Footnotes ==
- [a] Sources disagree on the number of cirques that carved into Broken Top; Wood and Kienle (1992) say three cirques, but Williams (1944) claims that five cirques altered the volcano's core.
