= Milli Fire =

2017 wildfire in the U.S. state of Oregon

- Part of the 2017 Oregon wildfires
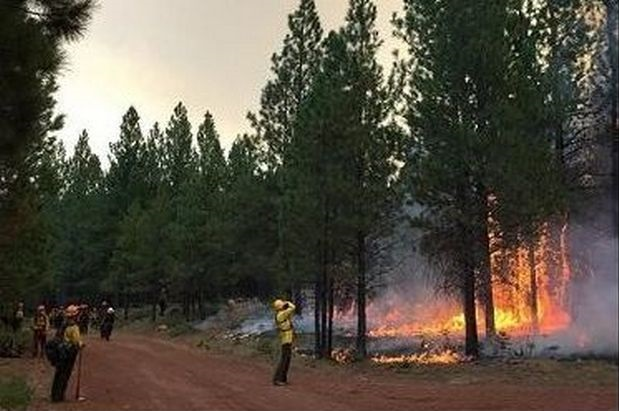
- Firefighters working on the Milli Fire
- Date: 11 August 2017 – 24 September 2017
- Location: Deschutes County, Oregon, U.S.
- Coordinates: 44.257°N 121.743°W

Statistics
- Burned area: 24,079 acres (97.44 km^{2})
- Land use: Public and private forest land

Impacts
- Cost: At least $15 million

Ignition
- Cause: Lightning

Map
- Location of Milli Fire in Oregon

The Milli Fire was a wildfire that burned over 24,000 acres (97 km^{2}) of Oregon forest land during the summer of 2017. The fire began in the Deschutes National Forest on 11 August 2017, the result of a lightning strike. The fire consumed thick forest vegetation southwest of Sisters, Oregon. Most of the burned area was public lands administered by the United States Forest Service, much of it in the Three Sisters Wilderness. Firefighters battled the blaze for over a month. At the peak of the firefighting effort, there were 675 firefighters working on the Milli Fire.

== Origin ==
During the afternoon of August 11, 2017, a wildfire was reported in the Deschutes National Forest, 9 miles (14 km) west of Sisters. It was located southwest of Black Crater Lake in the Three Sisters Wilderness Area. The cause of the fire was ignition by a lightning strike. The Forest Service called it the Milli Fire.

The Three Sisters Wilderness area covers over 286,700 acres (1,160 km^{2}). It has approximately 260 miles (420 km) of wilderness trails including 40 miles (64 km) of the Pacific Crest National Scenic Trail. Most of the wilderness is covered with dense mixed conifer forest with scattered alpine meadows. The forest area on the eastern slopes of the Cascade Range, where the Milli Fire began, is dominated by ponderosa pine. There are also large stands of lodgepole pine and dispersed Douglas-fir, western hemlock, and western juniper in some areas.

== Chronology ==
On August 11, a lightning strike ignited a fire in the Three Sister Wilderness west of the small town of Sisters. Initially, it was allowed to burn because it was in a remote part of the wilderness and firefighting crews were already deployed on other higher priority fires. By August 13, the Milli Fire had grown to 200 acres (0.81 km^{2}). Initially, a seven-person helitack crew rappelled into the fire area and began fire suppression work near Black Crater Lake. Later, an additional 15 firefighters were assigned to the fire along with four bulldozers and two excavators. During August 14–16, the fire grew to approximately 4,500 acres (18 km^{2}). As they fought the blaze, crews had to use extreme caution because the fire was burning across some areas scarred by the 2006 Black Crater Fire which had thick brush and dead standing timber.

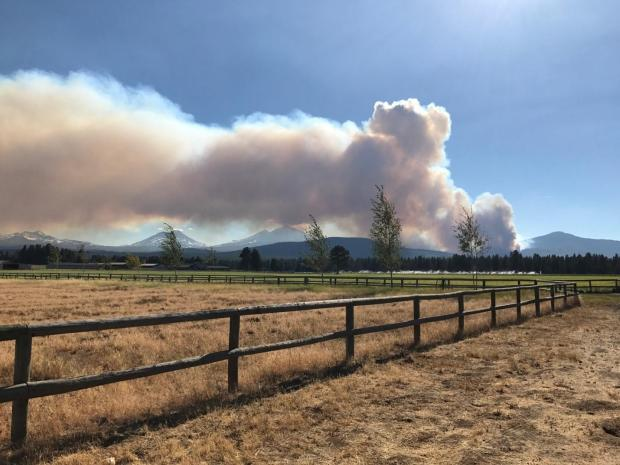
Milli Fire burning near Sisters

By August 17, the fire had burned 4,565 acres (18.47 km^{2}), moving east within 6 miles (9.7 km) of Sisters. As a result, fire officials announced that their highest priority was protecting homes and private property south and west of the community. During the day, fire crews continued to work through rugged terrain with dangerous overhead hazards. Nevertheless, firefighters made progress building fire lines with the help airtankers and helicopter water drops. Due to thick smoke in the area, the Oregon Department of Transportation closed Oregon Route 242 between Sisters and the Route 126 junction. In addition, approximately 1,600 residents of the Sisters area were told to prepare to evacuate their homes in case the fire began to burn north toward the community. That evening, Forest Service fire managers and local officials briefed members of the Sisters community at a town meeting. On August 18, the fire continued to burn actively through thick forest and brush covered areas with standing dead timber left over from two previous large wildfires. The activity included fire running along the ground, larger trees torching as the ground fire passed, and numerous spot fires igniting in front of the main fire. High winds and hot-dry weather conditions made firefighting difficult. Crews initiate backfires along forest roads to burnout ground fuels and create fire breaks while bulldozers and hand crews cut fire lines. The main focus of the firefighters was the north and east sides of the fire where it was burning toward 650 private homes. By the end of the day, there were 250 firefighters working on the Milli Fire.

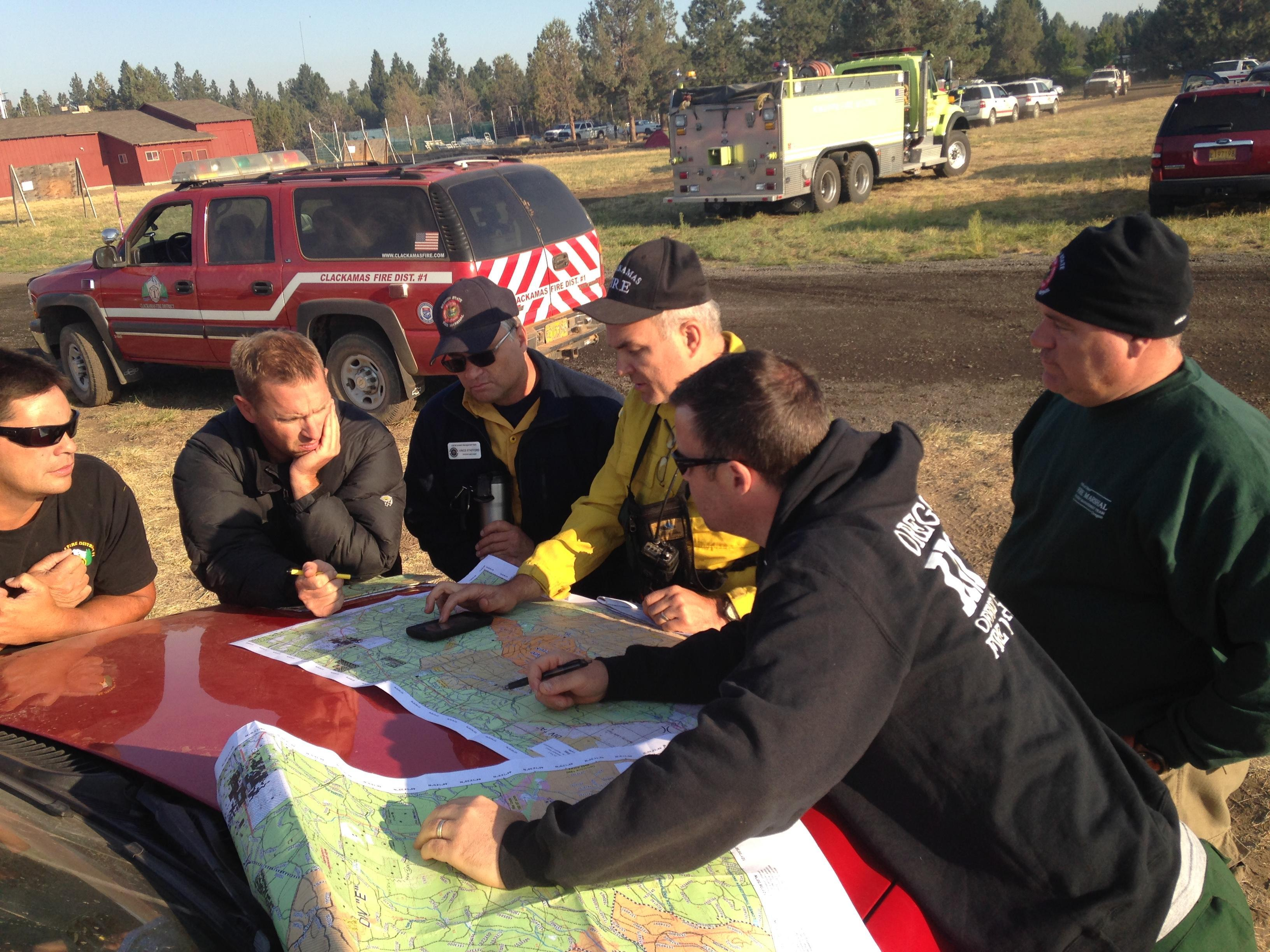
August 19 planning meeting

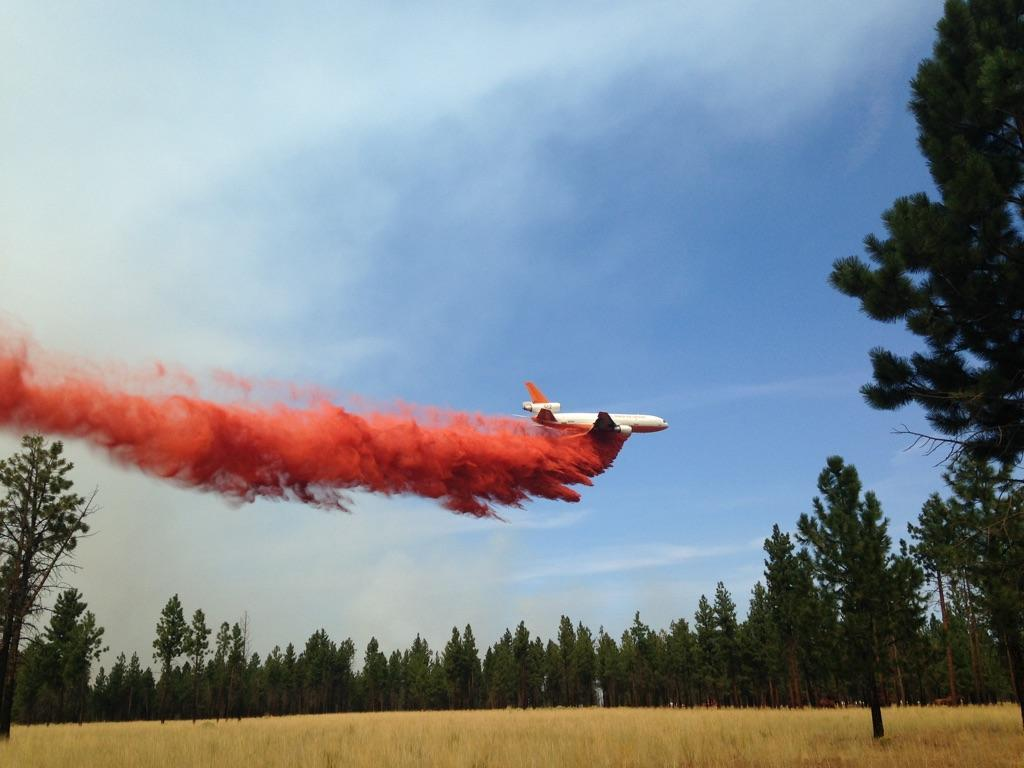
Retardant drop, August 20

On August 19, the fire remained out of control, running along the ground and igniting crown fires in some areas as it moved forward. As a result, residents of several subdivisions south and west of Sisters were ordered to evacuate their homes. During the day, firefighters continued to work fire lines on the north and east flanks of the blaze, trying to protect private property and the Whychus Creek watershed. Crews cleared away ground fuels using heavy equipment and burn-out operations widened fire breaks. They also suppressed numerous spot fires caused by flying embers carried on gusty winds. In addition, air tankers made numerous retardant drops along the front line of the fire. By the end of the day, firefighters had completed fire lines on the northeast and southeast corners. By August 20, the fire had grown to 8,014 acres (32.43 km^{2}), but the 487 firefighters on scene had checked the fire's progress toward Sisters. Cooler temperatures and higher humidity slowed the fire, allowing firefighters to close gaps in the north side fire line. Crews cleared heavy fuels along the fire line using bulldozers and other heavy equipment while ground crews continue to burnout areas within the fire line to strengthen containment. During the day, four large air tankers and several helicopters were dedicated to the Milli Fire, supporting fire crews on the ground. Reinforcements consisting of eight fire engines and two water tenders from the Oregon State Fire Marshal's office arrived and began clearing burnable materials from around evacuated homes south of Sisters. During the day, the Oregon Department of Environmental Quality and the Deschutes County Public Health Department issued an air quality warning, advising people in the Sisters area who are sensitive to smoke to stay indoor if possible.

The fire was very active during the night, growing to 8,014 acres (32.43 km^{2}) by the morning of August 21. Much of this growth was on the west side of the fire where it was burning back into the Three Sisters Wilderness, moving toward Lava Camp Lake and North Matthieu Lake. In the morning, air operations had to stand down for about hour during the solar eclipse. Ground crews also paused briefly to watch the eclipse. During the day, ground and air operations continued to focus on the east side of the fire where crews extended and strengthened fire lines to ensure private property near Sisters remained secure while Oregon State Fire Marshal teams patrol the evacuated neighborhoods. In the afternoon, air operations had to be discontinued due to heavy smoke that created a flight safety hazard. By the end of the day, the fire had grown to 10,496 acres (42.48 km^{2}) with 644 firefighters on scene. The Forest Service estimated that the fire was 20 percent contained. On August 22, the day began with 675 firefighters assigned to the fire. Because the northeast and southeast sides of the fire were effectively contained, fire managers shifted firefighting resources to the northwest side where the fire still threatened some homes and private property. However, some crews remained on the east side to patrol fire lines, spraying water to hot spots and looking for spot fires. The state fire marshal crews also continued to patrol evacuated neighborhoods and began assessing fire risk at Black Butte Ranch and other area along the Route 242 corridor west of Sisters. During the day, fire activity was moderate with the flames moving westward along the north side of Black Crater and slowly backing down the southern slope of Black Crater toward Lava Lake Camp and North Matthieu Lake. There was torching and crowning in isolated areas when winds pushed the fire up steep slopes. However, aircraft remained grounded all day due to smoky conditions. In the late afternoon, crews prepared to do burnout work on the northwest side of the fire if nighttime weather condition were favorable.

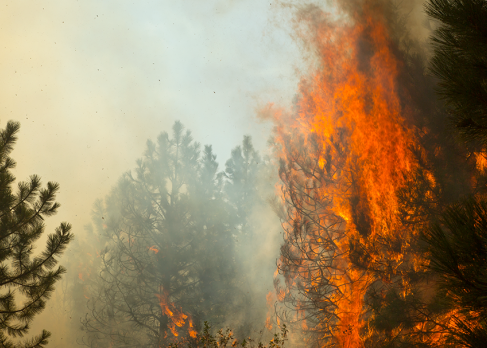
Trees torching off, August 24

Burnout operations were conducted overnight along forest roads parallel to the north side of the fire. These burnout activity continue during the day of August 23. Heavy equipment assisted ground crews as they prepared areas for future burnout operations. During the day, the fire remained active all along its west side, moving slowly through the wilderness toward Route 242. In the northwest, the fire continued to burn on the northern slope of Black Crater; and in the southwest, it moved into the lighter fuels that have grown up in the area burned by the 2012 Pole Creek Fire. On the northeast and southeast sides of the fire, crews patrolled the fire lines and prepared to begin mop-up operations while state fire marshal teams spent the day at the Black Butte Ranch and other residual areas helping homeowners make their property more fire resistant. By the end of the day, the fire covered 12,457 acres (50.41 km^{2}) and was 32 percent contained with 673 firefighters on station. On August 24, fire behavior was moderate with flames slowly burning ground cover and occasionally torching taller trees as the fire moves through the wilderness toward Route 242. The fire continued to burn on the north and west slopes of Black Crater out of reach of firefighters. During the day, a cold front moved through the area, clearing out the smoke and slowing the fire's progress. The clear skies allowed air support to be resumed. Helicopter water drops helped ground crew suppress spot fires and dowsed hot spots along the fire's edge. In the afternoon, burnout operations were conducted along Route 242, west of the fire's main front. At the end of the day, the fire covered 12,809 acres (51.84 km^{2}). The estimated containment was still at 32 percent and the number of firefighters on station did not change from the previous day.

On August 25, morning burnout operations were delayed due to poor visibility caused by heavy smoke. In the afternoon, the air cleared so aerial retardant drops could begin again. Air support was necessary to ensure burnout activities north of Route 242 were safe. By the end of the day, the Milli Fire had burned 13,485 acres (54.57 km^{2}). The fire was 32 percent contained with 673 firefighters working on fire suppression. It was reported that the cost of fighting the fire was $8,200,000. Over the weekend of August 26–27, warm-dry weather encouraged the fire along the west side as it moved through the Three Sisters Wilderness toward Lava Camp Lake. Nevertheless, burnout activities continued on the north side near Route 242 while other area showed minimal fire activity. Firefighters made good progress on the south side where crews patrolled fire lines, extinguishing hot-spots, and mopped up along the fire's edge. Crews also did mop-up work on the east side of the fire, focusing on the southeast corner.

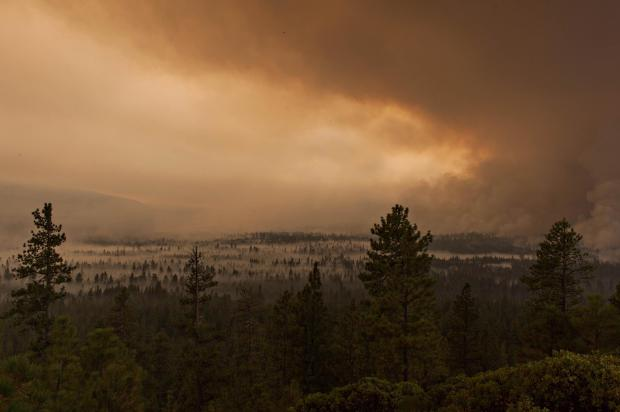
Air pollution from the Milli Fire

On August 28, the fire continued burning on the west side through the day while areas inside the fire line also continued to burn actively. The smoke from these internal fires created significant smoke and ash fall throughout the Sisters area. Back burning operations were cancelled because of heavy smoke which grounded aircraft throughout the day. A 3-acre (1.2 ha) spot-fire was found outside the fire line on the north side of the main fire. Crews quickly controlled the blaze and remained on the scene to mop-up. By the end of the day the fire had burned 18,067 acres (73.11 km^{2}) and was still only 32 percent contained. That evening, Forest Service fire managers and local officials held a town meeting at Sisters High School to give local residents an update on the fire conditions and on-going suppression efforts. On August 29, the fire continued to grow, reaching 21,703 acres (87.83 km^{2}) on August 30. During this period, it began burning through some private timber land inside the fire line that had previously escaped the flames. Crews back burned throughout the area to keep the fire from climbing into the forest canopy. Firefighters also found and extinguished several large spot fires. Crews also began fire line rehabilitation on the southeast side of the burn. By the evening of August 30, the fire was 44 percent contained with 500 firefighters still working on the fire. It was announced that a new smaller fire management team would be taking over on the following day.

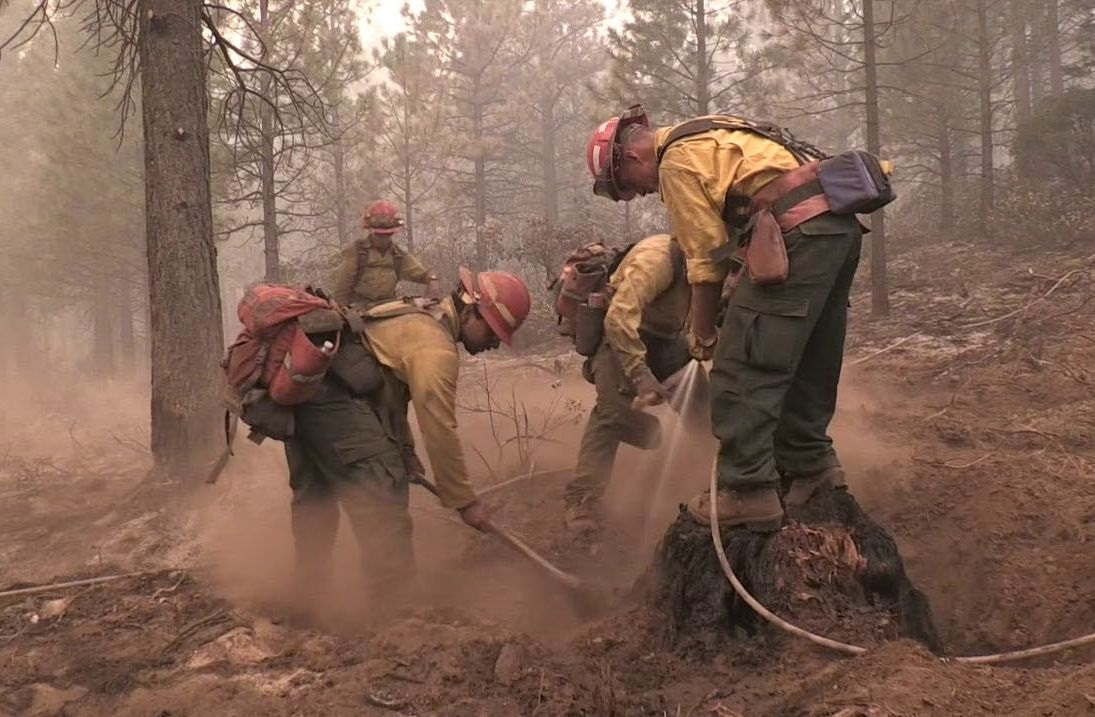
Crew mopping up, August 31

When the new leadership team arrived on August 31, the Milli Fire covered 22,190 acres (89.8 km^{2}) and was still only 44 percent contained with 451 firefighters on site. Unburned forest within the fire's perimeter continued to burn including a large block of private timber land. In most areas the fire crept slowly across the forest floor with only a few isolated pocket where larger tree were torched off. Crews patrolled fire lines along south and east side. One spot fire was found and extinguished. The fire continued to burn slowly down slope through thick timber in the Three Sisters Wilderness toward Route 242 on September 1–2. Unburned areas within the fire line also continued to burn. The focus of attention for firefighters was Lava Camp Lake just east of Route 242. Several pumper crews were assigned to protect the recreation facilities at the lake. Crews also patrolled fire lines along the northern perimeter and began mop up in that area while mop-up and fire line rehabilitation continued on the south and east sides. At the end of this period, the size of the fire was reported to be 22,718 acres (91.94 km^{2}) while the crew size had been reduced to 385 firefighters.

On September 3, weather throughout Central Oregon was hot and dry. While the fire stayed within established fire lines, large areas inside the perimeter continued to burn slowly, mostly along the ground. In the southwest, the fire is moving slowly down slope into the old Pole Creek burn area and in the west it reached the fire break along Route 242. Several pumper trucks along with ground crew worked around Lava Camp Lake to mop-up hot spots and protect the campground infrastructure. Mop-up also continued along the south and east flanks; however, heavy smoke kept helicopters from assisting ground crews. On September 4, clean-up began along Route 242. The Forest service worked with the Oregon Department of Transportation to remove logs, rock, and other debris from the roadway. During the day, the Forest Service revised their estimate of the fire's size. New estimate was 22,527 acres (91.16 km^{2}). They also increase their estimate of containment to 60 percent and reduce the number of firefighter on station to 318. On September 5, gusty winds were a good test of existing fire lines. On the southwest flank, the wind pushed the fire toward North Matthieu Lake. On the positive side, the wind cleared out much of the smoke, allowing air operation to begin again. Helicopters made water drops to help ground crew mop-up hot spots in the private forest land near the north edge of the fire and along Route 242. Mop-up and restoration work continued along the rest of the fire perimeter while unneeded heavy equipment was released for use on other fires. The number of firefighter on station at the end of the day was 295. No change in the fire's size or containment was reported. In the evening, fire managers and local officials held another town meeting at Sisters High School to update local residents on the Milli Fire. After consulting with fire managers on the morning of September 6, the Deschutes County Sheriff's office announced that all evacuation warnings related to the Milli Fire were dropped. This reflected local officials confidence that containment lines around the Sisters community were secure.

During September 7–10, firefighter mopped up along existing fire line while fuels within the fire perimeter continued burned in some areas. On the southwest side, the fire kept on burning slowly down slope through the Three Sisters Wilderness Area, occasionally torching pockets of taller trees. On 8 September, thunderstorms passed through the region, dropping a light rain over much of the fire area. The moisture reduced fires activity and aided humidity recovery. During this period, the number of firefighters on station was steadily reduced to 59 on September 10. On that date, the Forest Service estimated the Milli Fire covered 24,025 acres (97.23 km^{2}) with containment remaining at 60 percent. The total cost of fighting the fire was estimated at $15 million. Between September 11 and September 14, the fire continued to burning slowly down slope through the Three Sisters Wilderness toward lava beds, which create a natural fire break because there was no fuel to burn in the lava fields. During this period, fire crews patrolled the existing fire lines and finished mopping up hot spots. Forest Service and Oregon Department of Transportation crews also removed hazardous trees from the Route 242 corridor and repaired culverts along the roadway.

By September 15, the fire had burned 24,079 acres (97.44 km^{2}) and was 60 percent contained. Fire crews continued to work on rehabilitating fire line along the northwestern side of the fire area. Route 242 remained closed while Oregon Department of Transportation and Forest Service crews continued removing rocks and debris from the roadway, repaired culverts, and cut down hazardous snags along the route. Fire activity was minimal, smoldering through small unburned patches inside the fire line and creeping slowly down slope on the west side toward lava beds in the Three Sisters Wilderness. This activity was expected to continue until a season ending rain or snow fall naturally extinguished the last pockets of fire. On September 24, the Forest Service announced that the Milli Fire was 100 percent contained. However, Route 242 remained closed while Oregon Department of Transportation and Forest Service crews worked to remove hazardous roadside snags. Tree removal along Route 242 continued through October 6. Ultimately, several thousand large trees were removed along the roadway.

== Recovery ==
After the fire, Forest Service crews removed fire lines and restored the fire line areas. This included rehabilitation of 11.4 miles (18.3 km) of bulldozer lines and 1.3 miles (2.1 km) of hand line. Several temporary heliports and safety zones were also rehabilitated. Dangerous trees and snags were removed from approximately 18 miles (29 km) of roadway including 7 miles (11 km) along Route 242. The large trees that were removed along roads were piled in decked for commercial sales while smaller diameter trees killed by the fire were left standing. On steep slopes, some large trees were cut down and left lying across the hill side to help prevent soil erosion. On slopes above roads, high stumps were left exposed to help prevent burned logs from rolling down onto roadways.

When the Milli Fire was still only 60 percent contained, the Forest Service sent a Burn Area Emergency Response Team in the area to begin accessing the impact of the fire on the forest ecosystem. The team was asked to recommend steps to help the forest recover from the fire. The team was composed of about a dozen forest specialists with expertise in forestry, hydrology, geology, wildlife, and forest recreation.

The burn assessment team surveyed the Milli Fire area to determine how the fire would affect animals and native plant life. The team identified areas that were at risk of soil erosion as well as areas where invasive plants might slow the recovery of native plant species. The team also looked for post-fire threats to human life and safety that needed mitigation. In addition, the team evaluated the fire's impact on cultural assets and nearby communities.

The team's assessment was completed and delivered to the Deschutes National Forest on 21 September 2017. The Forest Service released the team's report to the public on 28 September 2017. The report recommended removing hazardous trees and snags along the Pacific Crest Trail and other forest trails as well as in the Lava Camp Lake campground. They also recommended closing several campsites due to safety concerns. The team recommended installation of new drainage systems on several forest roads along with debris clearing and general maintenance on approximately 50 miles (80 km) of roads that were heavily used during the fire. In addition, the team recommended monitoring the fire area for invasive plant species. In total, the assessment team recommended $131,000 in restoration and recovery projects.

As a follow-up to the initial post-fire assessment, the Forest Service began preparing a detailed resource rehabilitation and protection plan for the Milli Fire area. Among other things, that effort will determine if and where salvage logging projects will be conducted.

== Synopsis ==
In the final fire status update, the size of the Milli Fire was reported as 24,079 acres (97.44 km^{2}). The fire burned thick forest south and west of Sisters, much of it in the Three Sisters Wilderness. The main vegetation burned by the fire was old-growth ponderosa pine, along with large stands of lodgepole pine. Most of the burned area was public land administered by the United States Forest Service; however, some private forest land was also burned. While hundreds of residents living in the Sisters area were required to evacuate their homes during the Milli Fire, no residences or commercial structures were lost in the fire.

At the peak of the fire suppression effort, there were 675 firefighters from the United States Forest Service, Oregon Department of Forestry, Oregon State Fire Marshal's office, and several other agencies working on the fire. Equipment dispatched to the fire included pumper trucks, bulldozers, water tankers, helicopters, and air tankers. The total cost of fighting the fire exceeded $15 million.
