= Upper Chush Falls =

- Interactive map of Upper Chush Falls
- Location: Cascade Range southwest of Sisters in the U.S. state of Oregon
- Coordinates: 44°08′34″N 121°41′05″W
- Type: Horsetail
- Elevation: 5,630 feet (1,720 m)
- Total height: 200 feet (61 m)
- Longest drop: 130 feet (40 m)
- Watercourse: Whychus Creek
- Average flow rate: 40 cubic feet per second (1.1 m^{3}/s)

Upper Chush Falls is a 200-foot (61 m) waterfall on Whychus Creek, in the Cascade Range southwest of Sisters in the U.S. state of Oregon. Chush Falls, a 50-foot (15 m) waterfall, is further downstream on the same creek. Lying between Chush and Upper Chush is a third waterfall, The Cascade. These and several other falls on tributaries in the vicinity are within the Three Sisters Wilderness. The Northwest Waterfall Survey lists the fall's average flow at 40 cubic feet per second (1.1 m^{3}/s). The highest flows occur between May and August.

The United States Forest Service maintains the Chush Falls Trail, which runs along the east side of Whychus Creek and ends at an overlook above Chush Falls. From there, although the formal trail does not continue, hikers can follow the creek for about 0.5 miles (0.8 km) to The Cascade. The unofficial trail continues for about another 0.25 miles (0.40 km) and ends at the base of Upper Whychus Falls. A Northwest Forest Pass is required for parking at the trailhead.

== Names ==
Whychus Creek, formerly named Squaw Creek, considered derogatory in the 21st century, was renamed in 2006. Upper Chush Falls was officially known as Squaw Creek Falls before 2005, when it was renamed by the United States Board on Geographic Names. Chush is a Sahaptin word for water.

In a document written before the official name change, the Northwest Waterfall Survey identified Upper Chush Falls as Kaluwas Falls, which it described as a "proposed name". The same document listed the following "known alternate names": Squaw Creek Falls, Upper Squaw Creek Falls, Upper Chush Falls, and Whychus Creek Falls. Waterfalls of the Pacific Northwest refers to Upper Chush Falls as Whychus Creek Falls.

== See also ==
- Lower Chush Falls
- List of waterfalls in Oregon
