= Ball Butte =

Volcanic mountain in Oregon

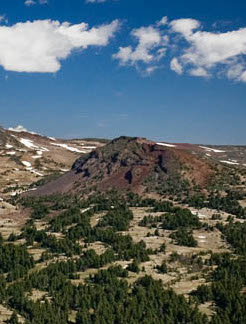
- Ball Butte photographed by the National Park Service on August 12, 2008

Highest point
- Elevation: 8,091
- Coordinates: 44.065916°N 121.676490°W

Geography
- Location: Deschutes, Oregon, U.S.
- Parent range: Cascade Range
- Topo map: USGS Broken Top

Geology
- Volcanic arc: Cascade Volcanic Arc
- Last eruption: Pleistocene

Ball Butte is a volcanic mountain of the Cascades in Deschutes County, Oregon, United States. Its summit has an elevation of 8,091 feet and is located southeast of Broken Top. It is a popular back-country skiing area and is best accessed from the Dutchman Flat Sno-Park or the Upper Three Creeks Sno-Park.
