= Chush Falls =

Waterfall in Oregon, United States

- Interactive map of Chush Falls
- Location: Deschutes National Forest
- Coordinates: 44.14986°N 121.6827°W
- Elevation: 4,967 ft (1,514 m)
- Total height: 68 ft (21 m)
- Total width: 80 ft (24 m)

Chush Falls, also known as Lower Squaw Creek Falls and Lower Whychus Falls, is a waterfall formed along Whychus Creek on the north skirt of North Sister, west side of the city of Bend in Deschutes County, Oregon. Access to Chush Falls is from Forest Service Road 16, south of Highway 242. The trail to the falls ends at the canyon rim overlooking the falls, but unmarked paths lead down to the base of the waterfall.

Chush is a Sahaptin word for water.

== See also ==
- Upper Chush Falls
- List of waterfalls in Oregon
