= Bend Glacier =

Glacier in the state of Oregon

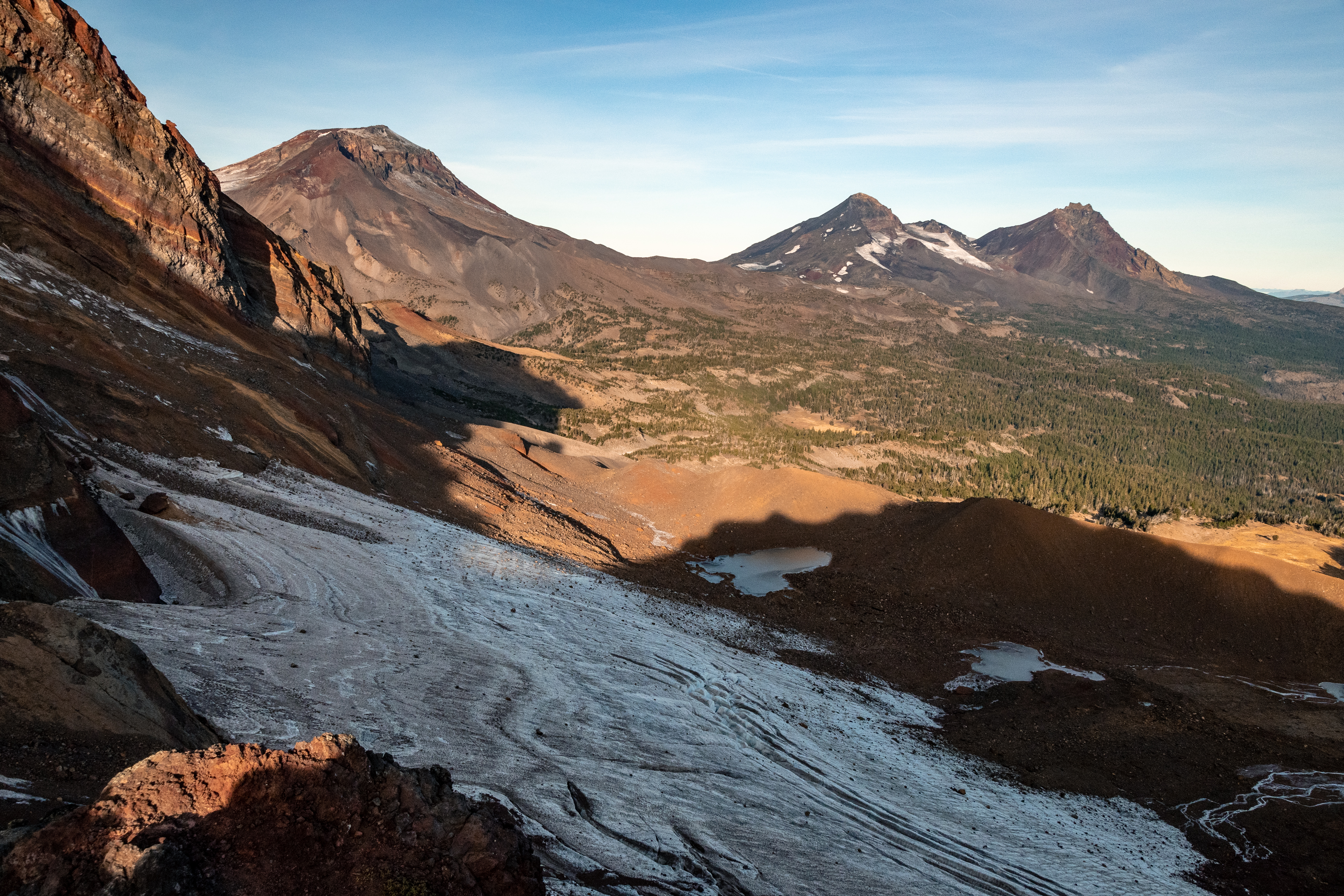
- Bend Glacier, October 2020

- Location within Oregon
- Type: Mountain glacier
- Location: Cascade Range, Deschutes County, Oregon, U.S.
- Coordinates: 44°05′10″N 121°41′39″W
- Terminus: Barren rock
- Status: Retreating

Bend Glacier is in the U.S. state of Oregon. The glacier is situated in the Cascade Range at an elevation around 8,000 feet (2,400 m). Bend Glacier occupies a cirque on the north flank of Broken Top, an extinct stratovolcano.

== See also ==
- List of glaciers in the United States
