= Three Sisters Wilderness =

Wilderness area in Oregon, United States

- IUCN category Ib (wilderness area)
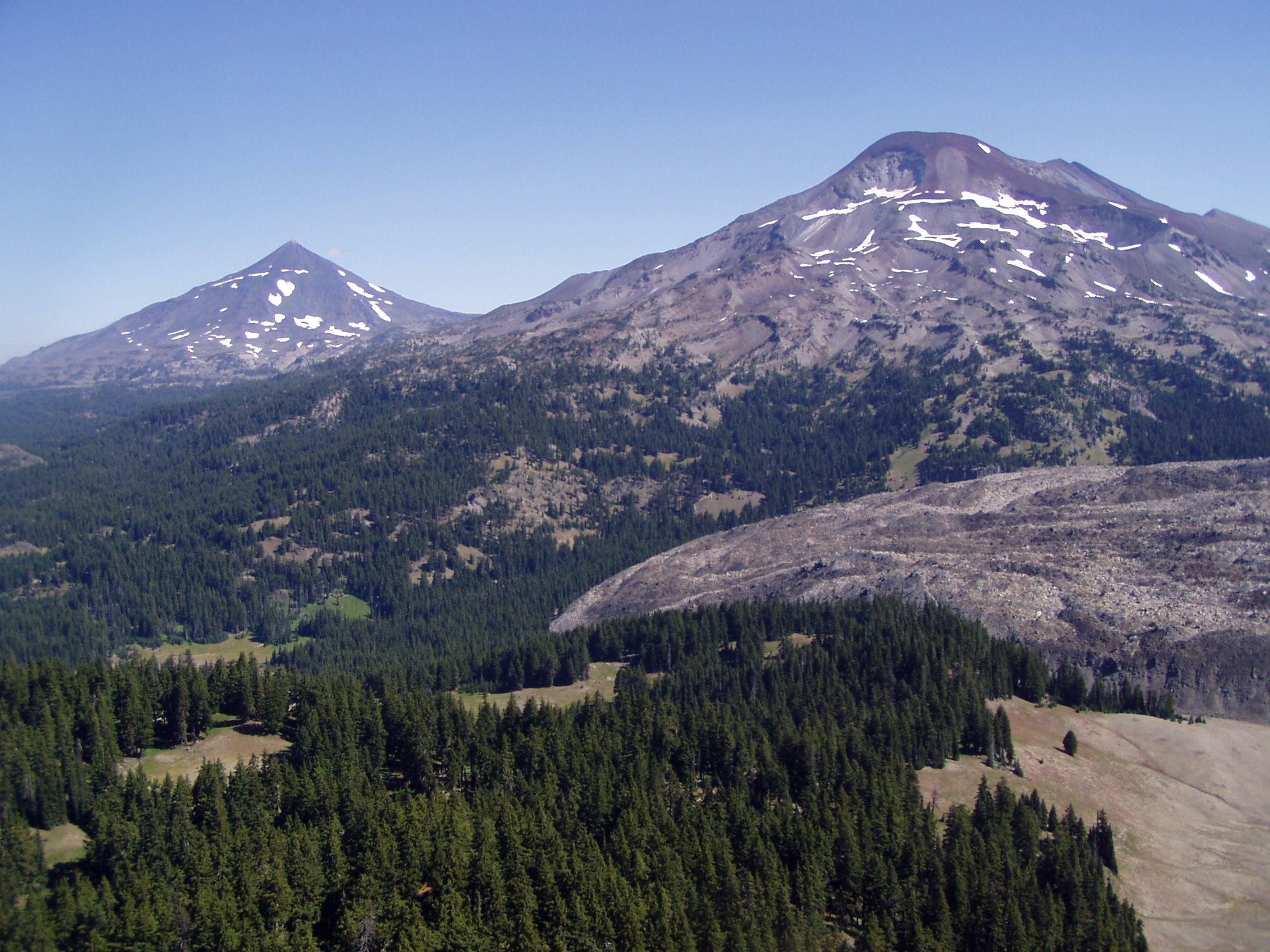
- Aerial view of the wilderness, showing Middle Sister (left) and South Sister
- Interactive map of Three Sisters Wilderness
- Location: Lane / Deschutes counties, Oregon, USA
- Nearest city: Sisters, OR (20 miles NE); Bend, OR (20 miles E)
- Coordinates: 44°05′N 121°57′W
- Area: 286,708 acres (1,160.27 km^{2})
- Established: September 3, 1964 (date of official designation under the Wilderness Act)
- Governing body: U.S. Forest Service

The Three Sisters Wilderness is a wilderness area in the Cascade Range, within the Willamette and Deschutes National Forests in Oregon, United States. It comprises 286,708 acres (1,160.27 km^{2}), making it the second-largest wilderness area in Oregon, after the Eagle Cap Wilderness. It was established by the United States Congress in 1964 and is named for the Three Sisters volcanoes. The wilderness boundary encloses the Three Sisters as well as Broken Top, which is southeast of South Sister.

Three Sisters was designated as a UNESCO Biosphere Reserve under the Man and the Biosphere Programme in 1976, and was one of 17 reserves in the United States withdrawn from the programme in June 2017.

Oregon Route 242 separates the Three Sisters Wilderness from the Mount Washington Wilderness to the north, while the Waldo Lake Wilderness shares the southern boundary.

The three peaks were known by pioneers as Faith, Hope and Charity. Nearby landmarks include The Husband, The Wife, and the Little Brother.

== Geology ==
Many types of landforms make up the wilderness area, but the most common are volcanic features, the most notable being the Cascades which are stratovolcanoes having formed around 1.6 million years ago. Numerous cinder cones have formed on their flanks as well as many lava flows that contain hundreds of lava tubes.

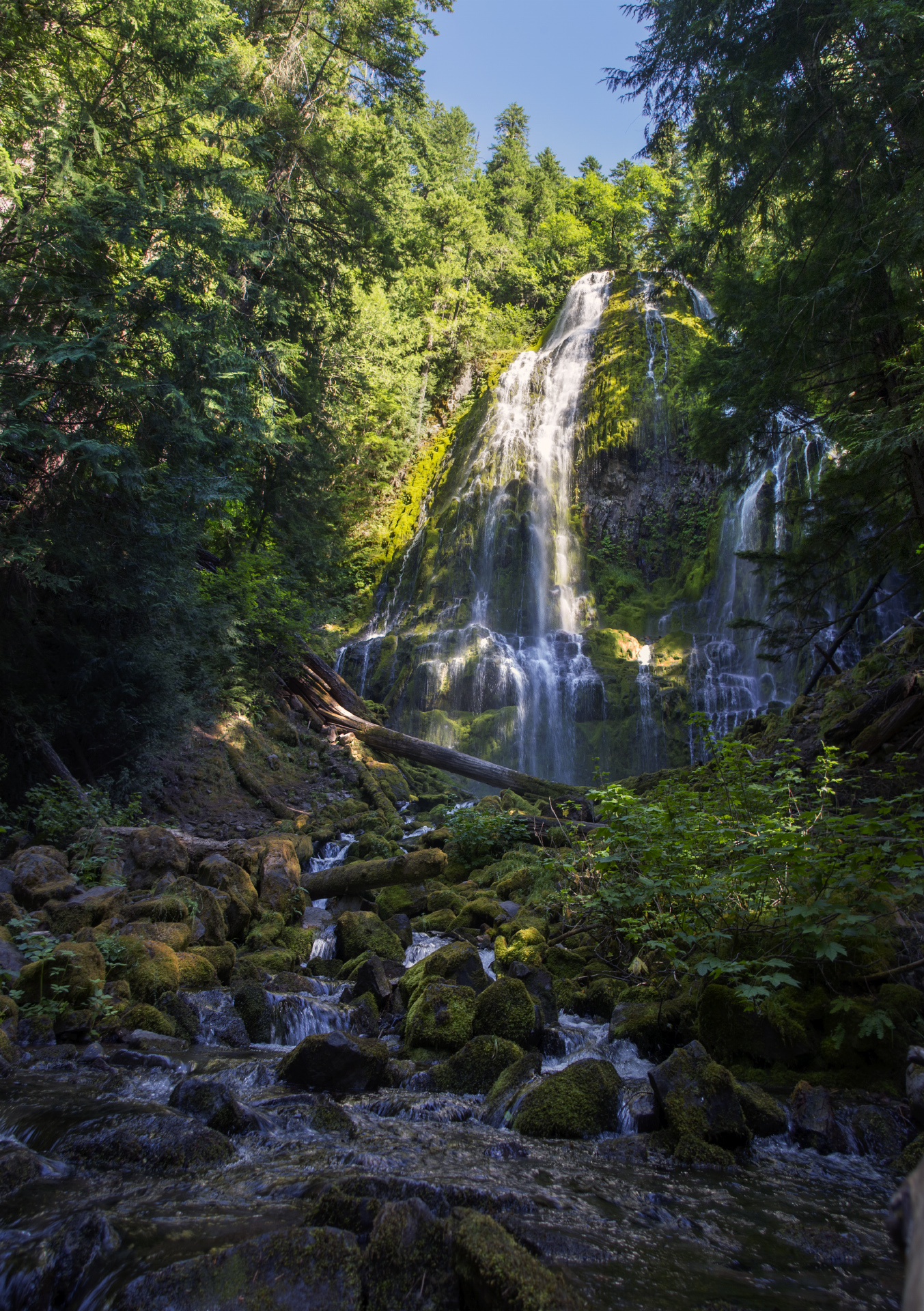
Proxy Falls in the wilderness

== Topography ==
The Three Sisters Wilderness ranges in elevation from 2,000 to 10,363 feet (610 to 3,159 m). The Three Sisters—North Sister at 10,090 feet (3,075 m), Middle Sister at 10,052 feet (3,064 m), and South Sister at 10,363 feet (3,159 m) — are found in the eastern portion of the Wilderness. Including Broken Top—just to the south at 9,175 feet (2,797 m) — there are 14 glaciers offering one of the best examples of the effects of glaciation in the Pacific Northwest. Collier Glacier, between North and Middle Sister, is the largest glacier in Oregon. The headwaters of the Wild and Scenic Whychus Creek (formerly Squaw Creek) emerge in the Wilderness.

== Climate ==
Climate data for South Sister 44.1007 N, 121.7698 W, Elevation: 9,825 ft (2,995 m) (1991–2020 normals)
Month	Jan	Feb	Mar	Apr	May	Jun	Jul	Aug	Sep	Oct	Nov	Dec	Year
Mean daily maximum °F (°C)	26.5 (−3.1)	25.8 (−3.4)	27.0 (−2.8)	30.5 (−0.8)	39.2 (4.0)	46.7 (8.2)	57.8 (14.3)	57.8 (14.3)	52.7 (11.5)	42.1 (5.6)	30.3 (−0.9)	25.5 (−3.6)	38.5 (3.6)
Daily mean °F (°C)	20.4 (−6.4)	18.4 (−7.6)	18.7 (−7.4)	21.1 (−6.1)	28.5 (−1.9)	35.3 (1.8)	44.7 (7.1)	44.8 (7.1)	40.2 (4.6)	32.0 (0.0)	23.8 (−4.6)	19.6 (−6.9)	29.0 (−1.7)
Mean daily minimum °F (°C)	14.3 (−9.8)	11.0 (−11.7)	10.3 (−12.1)	11.6 (−11.3)	17.9 (−7.8)	23.9 (−4.5)	31.7 (−0.2)	31.8 (−0.1)	27.7 (−2.4)	21.8 (−5.7)	17.2 (−8.2)	13.7 (−10.2)	19.4 (−7.0)
Average precipitation inches (mm)	20.23 (514)	14.71 (374)	16.25 (413)	13.2 (340)	9.05 (230)	5.67 (144)	1.45 (37)	1.63 (41)	4.37 (111)	11.19 (284)	19.24 (489)	23.2 (590)	140.19 (3,567)
Source: PRISM Climate Group

== Vegetation ==
Forest cover in the Three Sisters Wilderness includes Douglas fir, Pacific silver fir, subalpine fir, mountain hemlock, western hemlock, lodgepole pine and ponderosa pine. A large area of the wilderness above timberline contains alpine meadows.

== Recreation ==
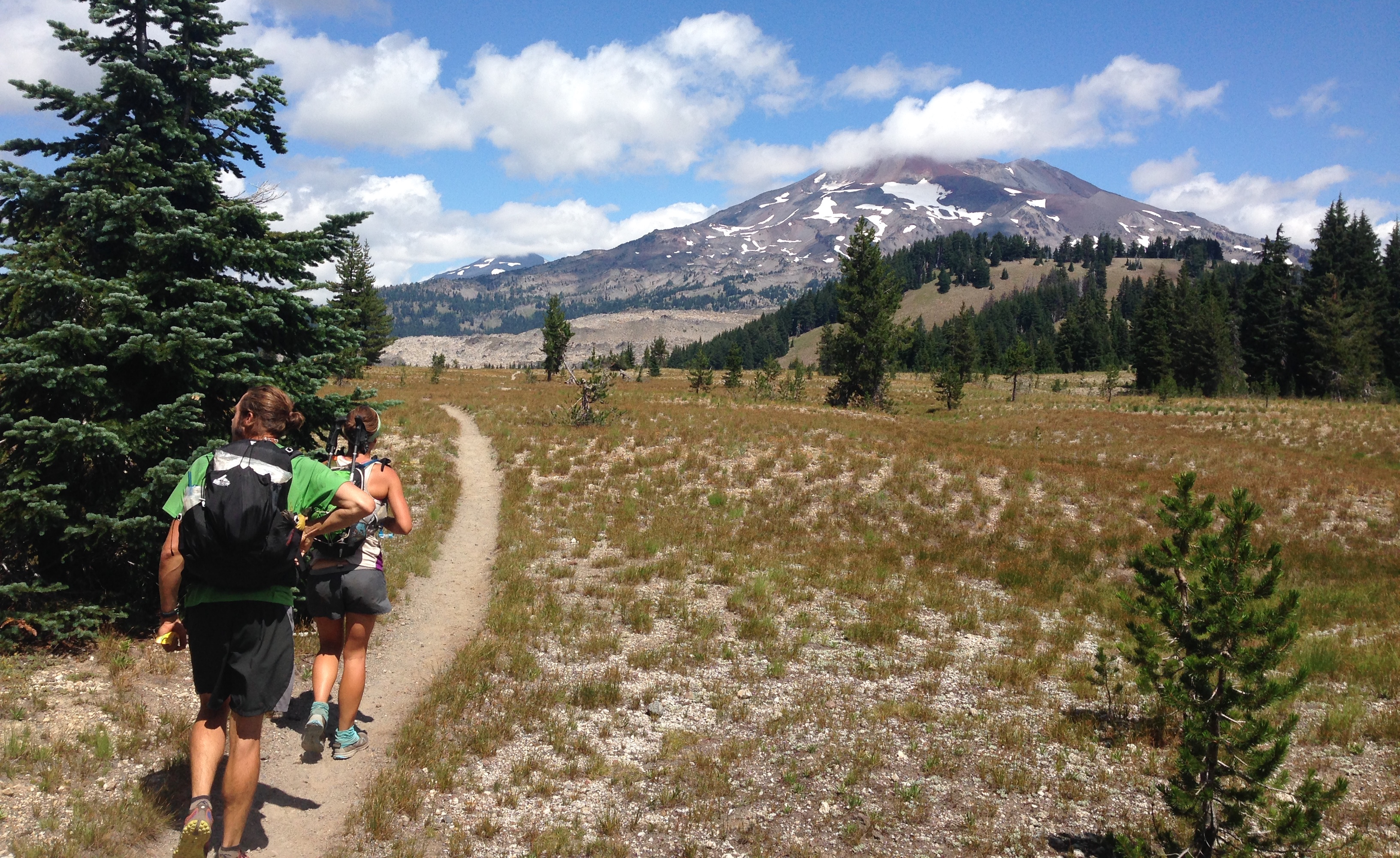
Hikers in the wilderness south of South Sister

Popular recreational activities in the Three Sisters Wilderness include camping, hiking, climbing and fishing. South Sister and Middle Sister are not technically difficult climbs, but summiting North Sister requires technical expertise and equipment. More than 260 miles (420 km) of trails cross the wilderness, including 40 miles (64 km) of the Pacific Crest Trail. The 9.8-mile (15.8 km) French Pete Trail and its surrounding old-growth forest, a nationwide political issue in the 1970s, are located on the western edge of the wilderness near Cougar Reservoir.

== See also ==
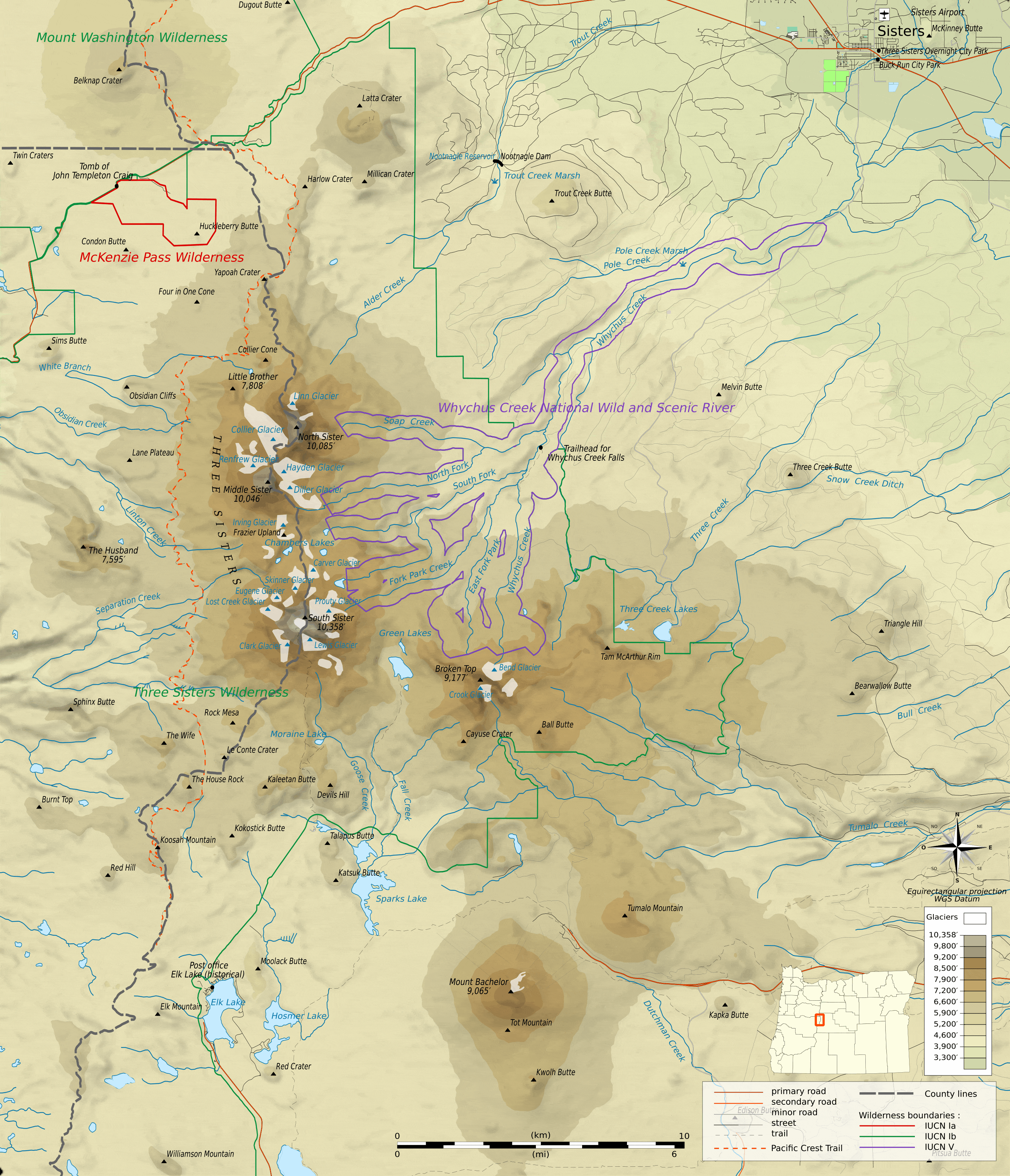
Topographic map of area

- List of Oregon Wildernesses
- List of U.S. Wilderness Areas
- Wilderness Act
