= Crook Glacier =

Glacier in Oregon, United States

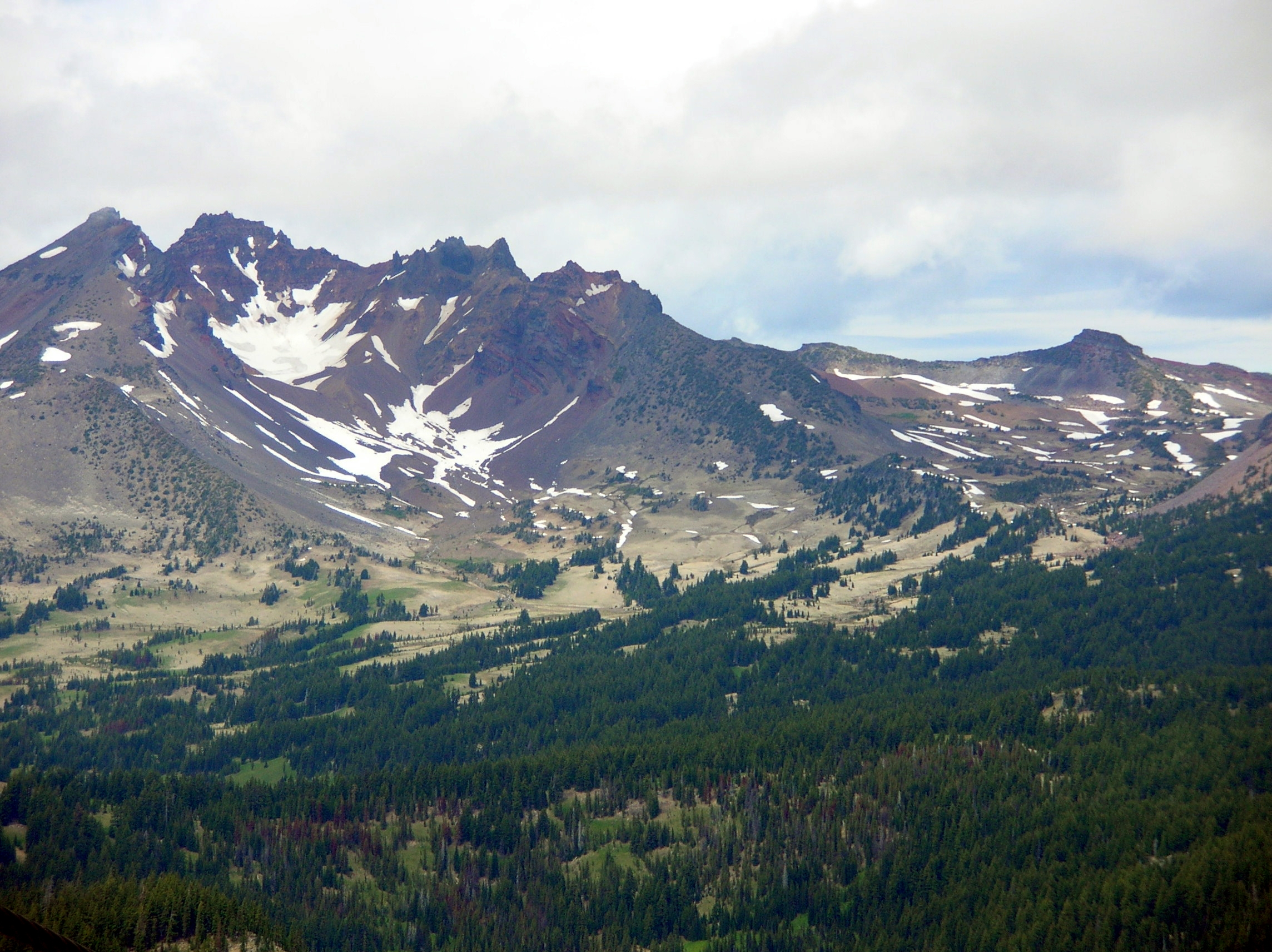
- Crook Glacier near summit of Broken Top

- Location within Oregon
- Type: Mountain glacier
- Location: Cascade Range, Deschutes County, Oregon, U.S.
- Coordinates: 44°04′48″N 121°41′59″W
- Terminus: Barren rock
- Status: Retreating

Crook Glacier is located in the U.S. state of Oregon. The glacier is situated in the Cascade Range at an elevation between 8,700 and 8,000 feet (2,700 and 2,400 m), nestled within a cirque to the immediate south of Broken Top, an extinct stratovolcano.

== See also ==
- List of glaciers in the United States
