= Whychus Creek =

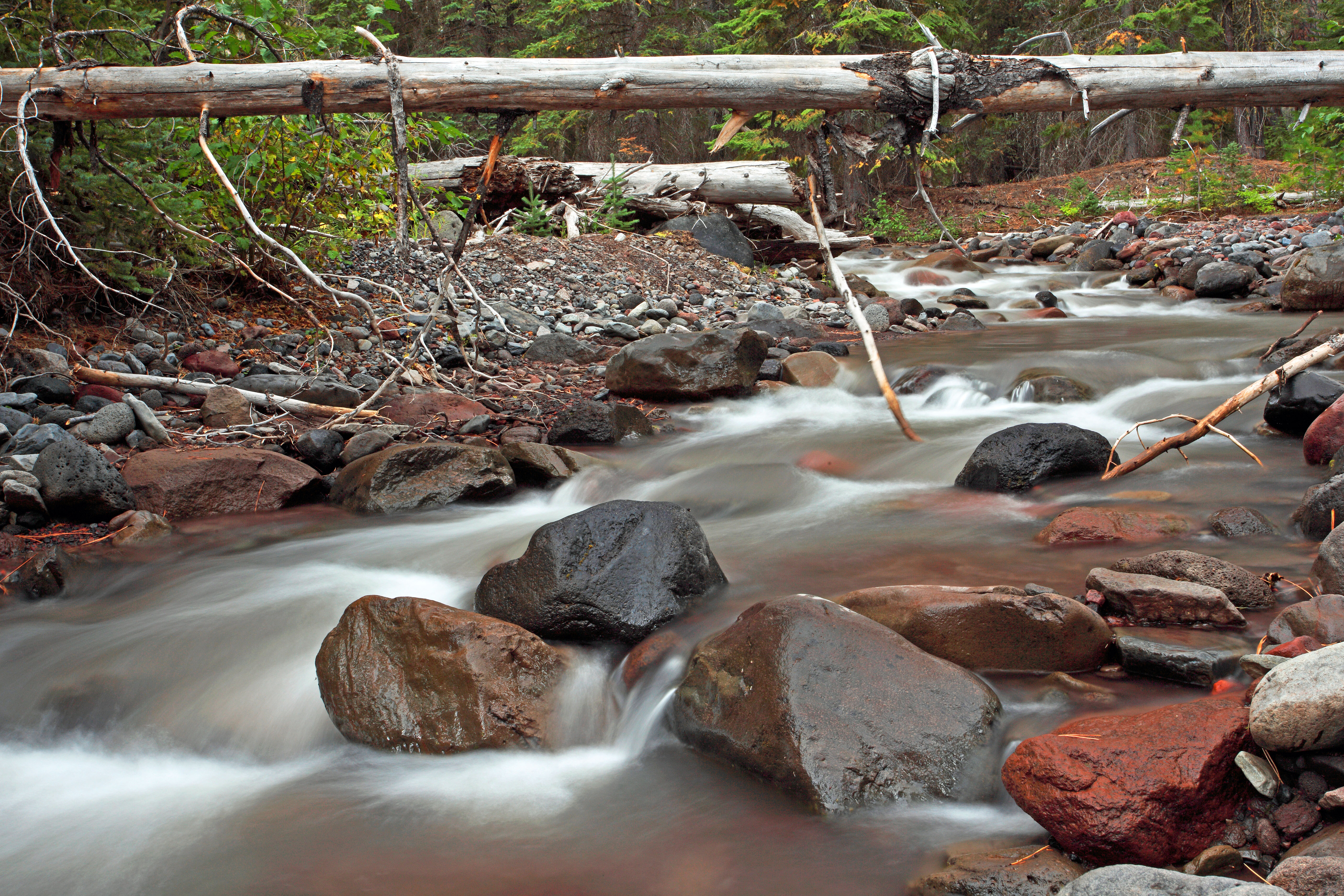

- Location of the mouth of Whychus Creek in Oregon
- Etymology: Native American (Indian) name for the creek, according to 19th-century surveyor, Robert S. Williamson

Location
- Country: United States
- State: Oregon
- County: Deschutes and Jefferson

Physical characteristics
- Source: Broken Top, Cascade Range
  - location: Deschutes National Forest, Deschutes County
  - coordinates: 44°05′21″N 121°41′36″W
  - elevation: 7,617 ft (2,322 m)
- Mouth: Deschutes River
  - location: Crooked River National Grassland, Jefferson County
  - coordinates: 44°27′35″N 121°20′07″W
  - elevation: 2,110 ft (640 m)
- Basin size: 253 sq mi (660 km^{2})

National Wild and Scenic Rivers System
- Type: Wild, Scenic
- Designated: October 28, 1988

Whychus Creek is a tributary of the Deschutes River in Deschutes and Jefferson counties in the U.S. state of Oregon. Formerly named Squaw Creek, considered derogatory in the 21st century, it was renamed in 2006. Explorer John C. Frémont camped along the stream in 1843 but did not identify it by name. Robert S. Williamson, a surveyor who camped there in 1855, said its Indian (Native American) name was Why-chus.

== Course ==
Whychus Creek begins about 7,600 feet (2,300 m) above sea level at the base of Bend Glacier on Broken Top in the Cascade Range. Flowing generally north through the Three Sisters Wilderness, the stream plunges over 200-foot (61 m) Upper Chush Falls before receiving Park Creek from the left and plunging over 50-foot (15 m) Chush Falls. Downstream of the waterfalls, the creek receives South Fork and North Fork from the left and Snow Creek from the right.

Turning northeast, the creek intersects Whychus Creek Canal, which diverts water to McKenzie Canyon Reservoir and other parts of the Three Sisters Irrigation District. Flowing by the southeast side of the city of Sisters, Whychus Creek passes under U.S. Route 20 and Oregon Route 126, which overlap in this vicinity, before receiving Indian Ford Creek from the left. Continuing northeast, the creek leaves Deschutes County and enters Jefferson County and the Crooked River National Grassland. The creek empties into the Deschutes River downstream of the city of Redmond and about 123 miles (198 km) from the larger stream's confluence with the Columbia River.

== See also ==
- List of rivers of Oregon
