= Collier Glacier =

Glacier in the state of Oregon

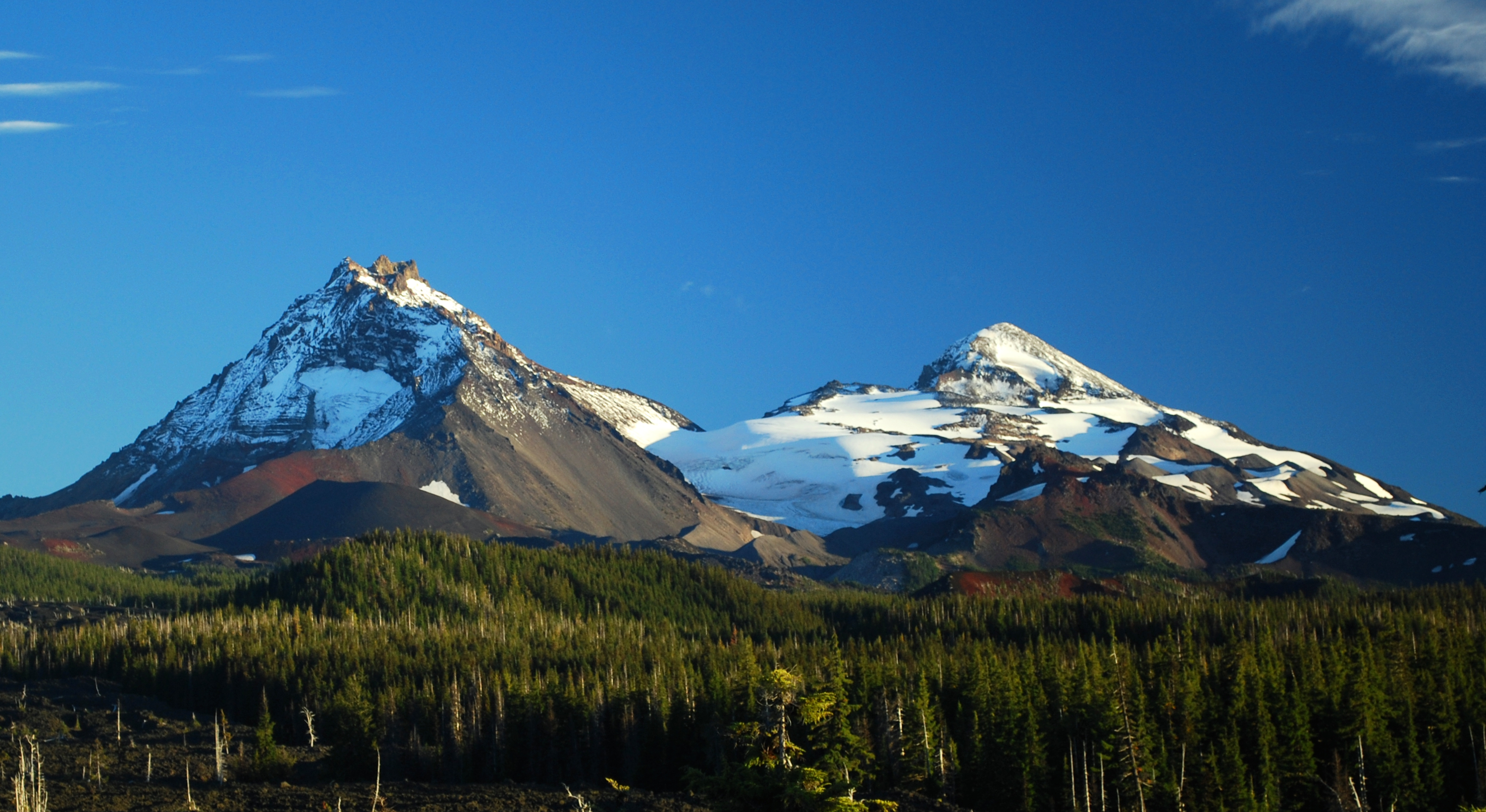
- The Collier Glacier is between North Sister (left) and Middle Sister.

- Location within Oregon
- Type: Mountain glacier
- Location: Cascade Range, Lane County, Oregon, U.S.
- Coordinates: 44°09′54″N 121°47′06″W
- Length: 5,000 ft (1,500 m)
- Terminus: Barren rock
- Status: Retreating

Collier Glacier is in the U.S. state of Oregon. The glacier is situated in the Cascade Range at an elevation generally above 8,000 feet (2,400 m). Collier Glacier is on the west slopes of North Sister, an extinct shield volcano. Since its last maximum extent during the Little Ice Age (1350–1850 A.D.) the glacier has retreated over a mile.

== See also ==
- List of glaciers in the United States
