= Waldo Lake Wilderness =

Protected wilderness area in the U.S. state of Oregon

- IUCN category Ib (wilderness area)
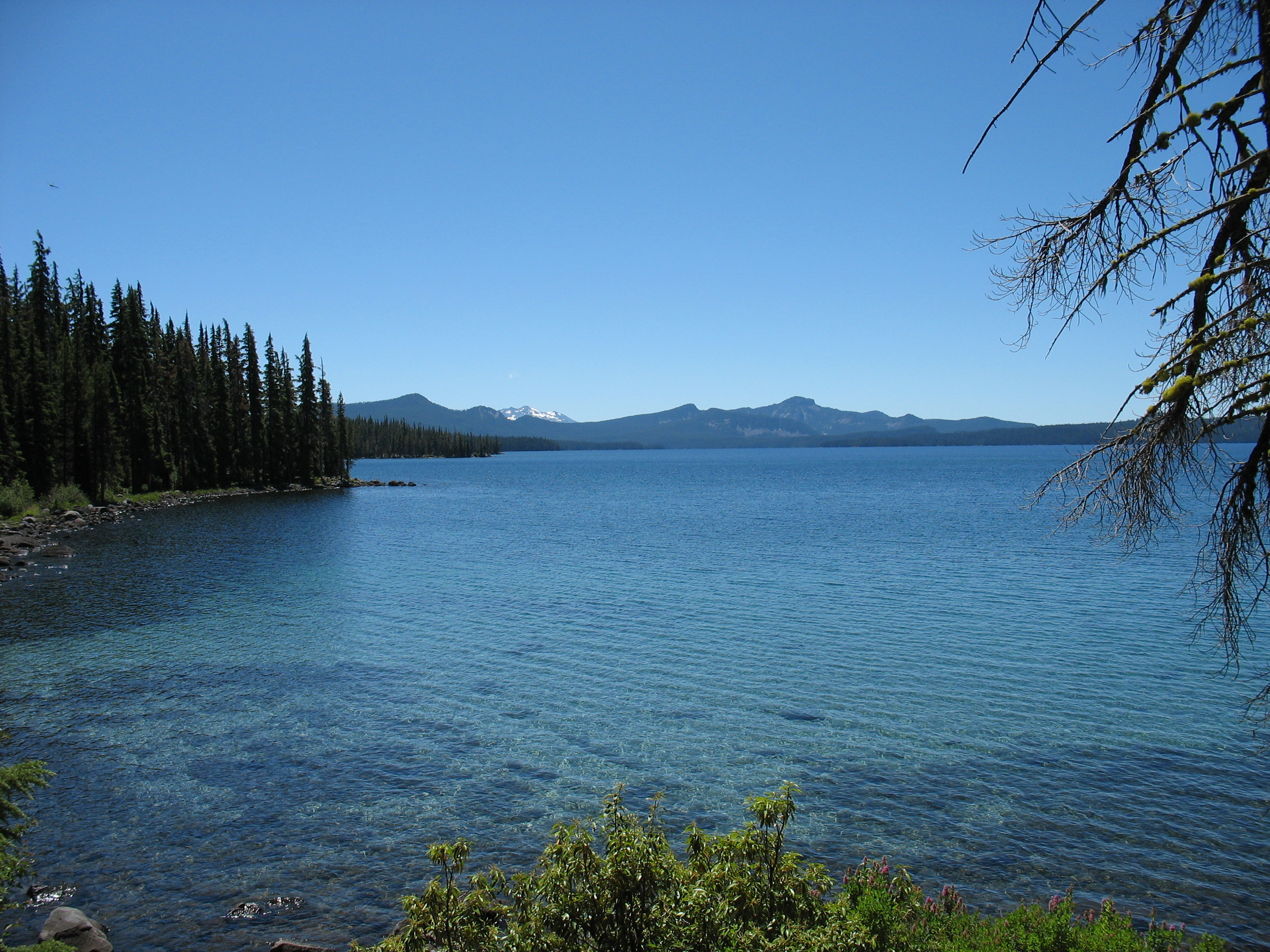

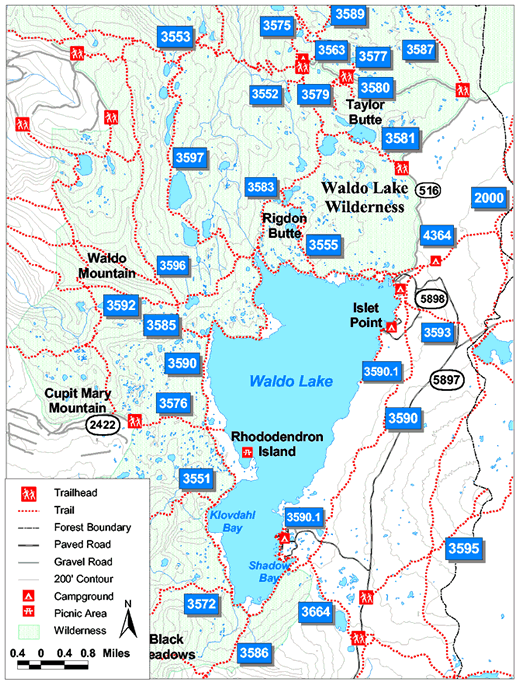
- Map of Waldo Lake and surroundings
- Location: Lane County, Oregon, United States
- Nearest city: Oakridge, Oregon
- Coordinates: 43°47′52.78″N 122°4′27.34″W
- Area: 37,162 acres (15,039 ha)
- Established: 1984
- Governing body: United States Forest Service

Waldo Lake Wilderness is a wilderness area surrounding Waldo Lake in the central Oregon Cascades. Located within the Willamette National Forest, it was established in 1984 and consists of 37,162 acres (15,039 ha).

== Geography ==
Ninety-eight percent of the Waldo Lake Wilderness is covered by forest on moderate to steep terrain, which ranges in elevation from 2,800 to 7,144 feet (853 to 2,177 m).

Waldo Lake itself is outside the wilderness boundary, but it is considered one of the purest lakes in the world: vertical visibility can exceed 100 feet (30 m) on a clear day. It was scooped out by ancient glaciers and is Oregon's second-largest lake at 10 square miles (26 km^{2}) with a maximum depth of 420 feet (130 m). Within the wilderness are the Six Lakes Basin, Eddeeleo Lakes, Wahanna Lakes, and Quinn Lakes. There are approximately 84 miles (135 km) of trails that lead to many of these lakes. Waldo Lake Trail, much of which is not in the wilderness boundary, provides a 22-mile (35 km) loop around Waldo Lake. Vegetation in the Waldo Lake Wilderness consists mostly of Douglas-fir, mountain hemlock, and Pacific silver fir.

== Recreational activities ==
Primary activities in the Waldo Lake Wilderness are hiking, camping, fishing, and boating. Gasoline-powered motorboats on the lake have been banned since 2012 after nearly twelve years of public comment, deliberations, and decision-making.

== See also ==
- List of Oregon Wildernesses
- List of U.S. Wilderness Areas
- Wilderness Act
