= Breitenbush =

Breitenbush may refer to:

- Breitenbush River, a tributary of the Santiam River in the U.S. state of Oregon
- Breitenbush, Oregon, a community on the Breitenbush River
- Breitenbush Hot Springs Retreat & Conference Center, a retreat and conference center on the Breitenbush River
- Breitenbush Hot Springs (thermal mineral springs), the geological feature of thermal mineral springs system consisting of the upper and lower zones
