= Breitenbush Hot Springs Retreat & Conference Center =

Retreat in Detroit, Oregon

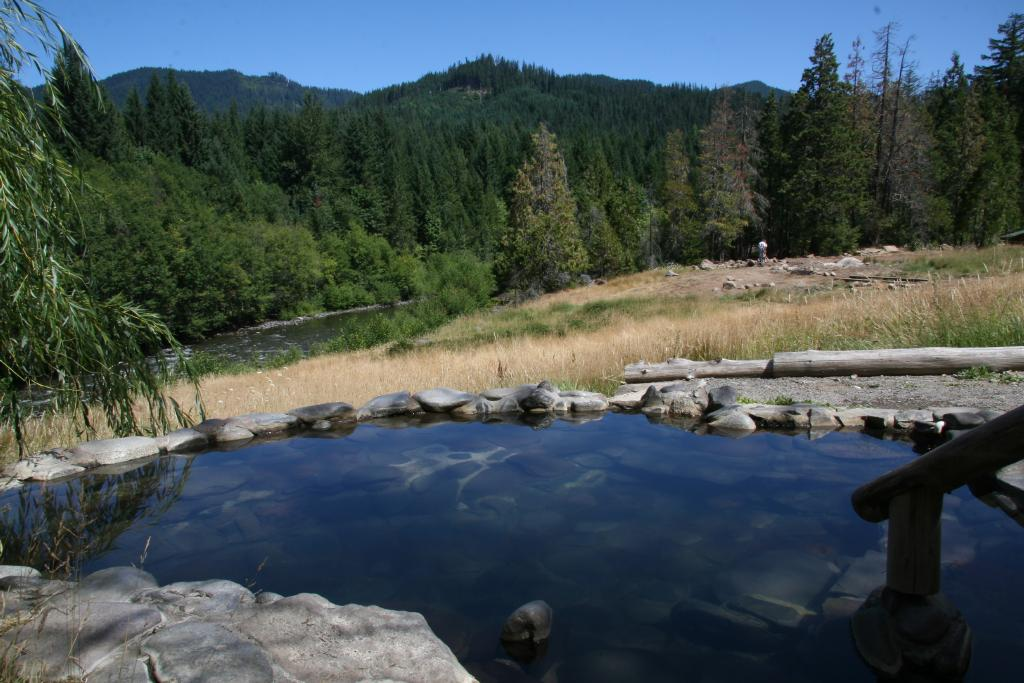
- View From Breitenbush Meadow Pool
- Mission: "To provide a safe and potent environment where people can change and evolve in ways they never imagined."
- Focus: Humanism, Sustainability, Community
- Address: 53000 Breitenbush Rd
- Location: Detroit, Oregon, United States
- Coordinates: 44.783061°N 121.9777805°W
- Interactive map of Breitenbush Hot Springs Retreat & Conference Center
- Website: Breitenbush.com
- Location in Oregon

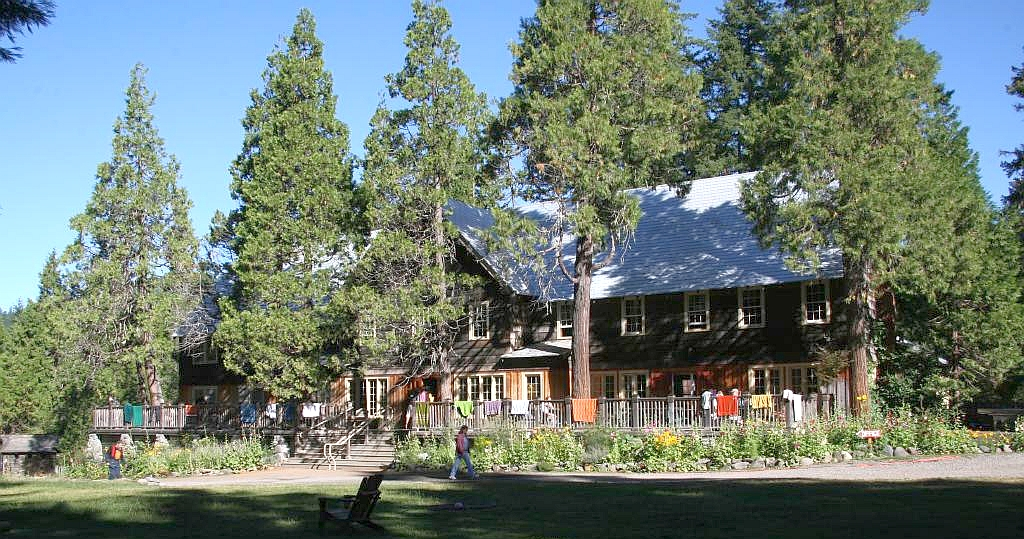
Lodge at Breitenbush Hot Springs

Breitenbush Hot Springs Retreat & Conference Center (pronunciation: BRIGHT en BUSH), is a worker-owned co-op featuring holistic and spiritual retreats. It is surrounded by the Willamette National Forest in Marion County, Oregon, United States, 10 miles (16 km) east-northeast of Detroit along the West Cascades Scenic Byway and 12 miles (19 km) northwest of Mount Jefferson. The closest metropolitan area, Salem, is approximately 60 miles (100 km) to the west. The retreat center is located at the site of the historic Breitenbush Hot Springs, which drain into the adjacent Breitenbush River.

Breitenbush was evacuated and suffered considerable damage to the cabins, summer homes and other facilities in early September 2020 due to the Santiam Fire. Breitenbush reopened in early 2021 with limited guest housing available and is continuing to rebuild more structures for guests and staff alike.

== Retreat and conference center ==
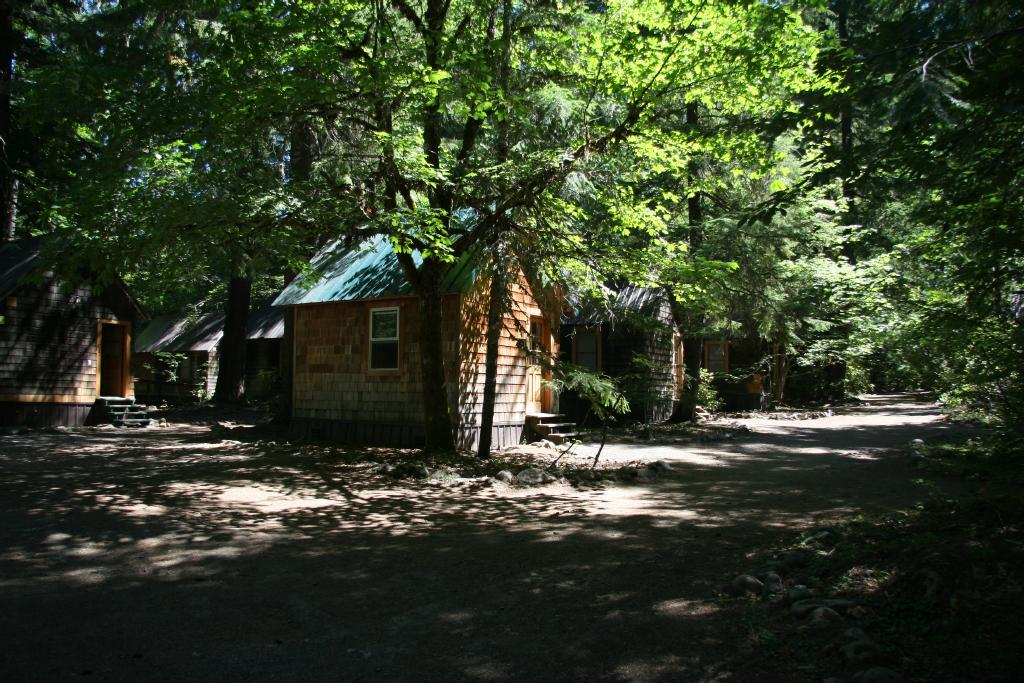
Guest cabins prior to the 2020 Lionshead fire

Breitenbush is known for hosting many counterculture, holistic, spiritual, and New Age workshops; most of which are available to the public by advance reservation. Persons coming for their own meditative practice or for general recreation are also welcomed. The retreat center, in operation since 1981, was closed by fire on September 7, 2020. When operational, the center had access to hot spring-fed pools and tubs, steam sauna, meals, and staff-facilitated programming. There are more than 20 miles (32 km) of adjacent trails available for hiking. Additional on-site facilities included a lodge, rustic guest cabins, tent platforms (in summer), walking labyrinth, meditative sanctuary, gift shop, and three workshop spaces, most of which were destroyed in the fire.

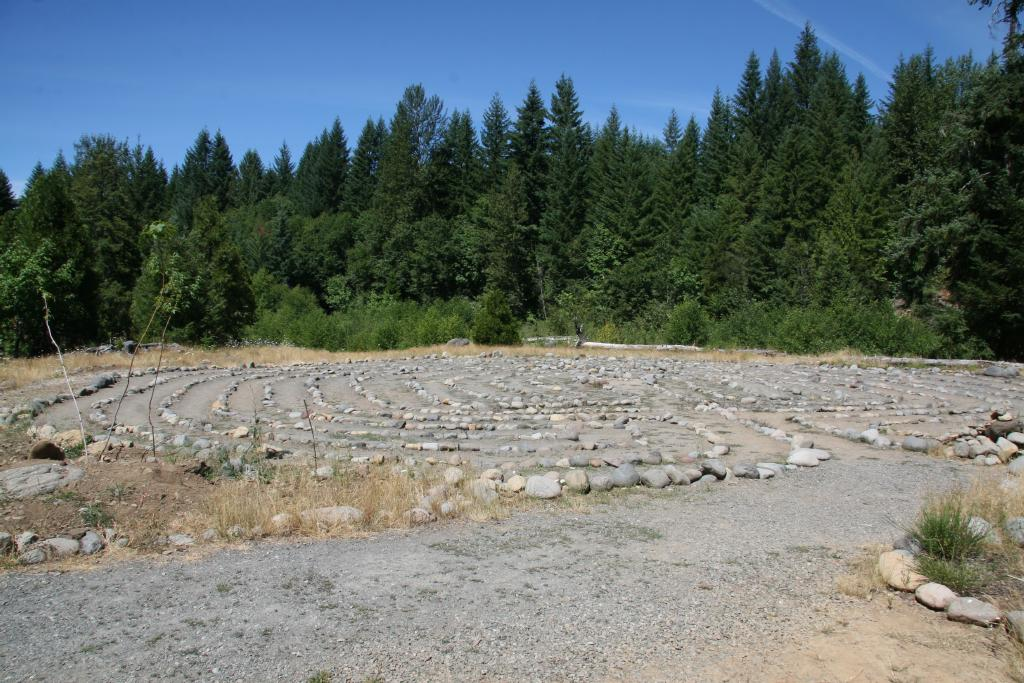
Walking Labyrinth

Sustainability is an important value of the retreat center. The center is off-the-grid; all facilities are powered by means of an employee-maintained hydroelectric power plant (diesel generators serve as back-up). Breitenbush is the largest private geothermal facility in the Pacific Northwest. The surrounding mountains prevent operation of cellphones and reception of non-satellite radio and television.

=== Workshops ===
Prior to COVID-19, Breitenbush hosted around 150 workshops each year. The retreat & conference center served as the venue; workshops were independently facilitated and varied in content, but most were based on humanistic values and/or ecology. Examples of workshop content include yoga teacher training; mushroom, herbal, and farmers conferences; singing, dancing, & art; learning conscientious business practices; tantric couples' work; nutrition & wellness, etc.

=== Hot springs soaking ===
Soaking opportunities include three rock-lined pools comfortably accommodating up to ten people each, a cedar sauna for up to 12 people, four hot tubs which lie in a concrete patio, each comfortably seating up to four people, and several smaller claw-foot bathtubs allowing for single-use soaking.

=== Hot springs ===
The geothermal hot springs result from precipitation onto the surrounding Cascade Range. Analysis of the mineral and chemical content indicates an average subsurface temperature of 356 °F (180 °C) and a migration time of several thousand years. The water's long contact with aquifer rock at such temperatures saturates it with dissolved minerals such as sulfate, calcite, analcime, anhydrite, chalcedony, microcline, muscovite, quartz, wairakite, and the elements potassium, sodium, magnesium, calcium, and lithium. The surface temperature of the springs is about 180 °F (82 °C)—the lower temperature due to heat transfer to cooler rock near the Earth's surface.

== Community ==
=== Founding and vision ===
The community-run retreat & conference center has been managing the location since 1977. It has followed on the heels of successive business ventures dating back to the early 1900s, several of which struggled in the face of harsh winters and other natural challenges stemming from the remote and forested location. The previous resort closed in 1972 following a series of floods. Alex Beamer purchased the land and defunct facilities, many of which had fallen into a state of disrepair. Beamer began recruiting others to join him in restoring the property and start an intentional community. The early community labored for little more than their values, lodging, and a meager stipend; through their efforts the property's hydroelectric plant was restored, geothermal wells were dug and heat circulated; a dam and footbridge crossing the river were constructed; workshop spaces and improved hot springs soaking facilities were developed to facilitate a health-centered retreat center. The community was largely egalitarian, with residents performing a variety of tasks, ranging from skilled to domestic.

The desire of logging interests to harvest Breitenbush timber posed a threat to the site that continued until the Clinton Forest Plan of 1993 designated it a late successional reserve. Community members routinely lobbied to stop logging interests in the area and many became activists practicing "radical direct action" such as chaining themselves to trees and obstructing equipment. After discovering a roosting pair of spotted owls (a then protected species) in the neighboring forest, Breitenbush activists were successful in curbing logging operations, saving much of the surrounding forests.

Worker-residents went without pay early on and it was common for residents to have side-jobs for the sake of subsistence. Historian James J. Kopp reflects that the operation's early years fits within a landscape of utopian and counter-cultural movements that saw increasing popularity in the 1960s & 1970s.

Having recruited a core group of dedicated community members and seeing operations starting to take off, Beamer sold the property to members of the community in 1985 (the operation was incorporated in 1981). The corporation officially converted to a worker-owned cooperative in 1989. Management and structure throughout the 1980s and early 1990s continued to reflect the co-op's early values, with decisions being made by consensus among the member-owners.

=== Current organization ===
The current community consists of several dozen workers and their families, who live in the community village year-round on the 154-acre (0.62 km^{2}) site. There was a drastic reduction in member-owners following the 2020 wildfires, but as of 2024, the community is growing again. New members were approved by the co-op's Board of Directors after a year of work and purchasing an equity share. Members of the cooperative have the ultimate authority when voting on issues in semi-annual stakeholder meetings, while day-to-day operations are delegated to the Board and managing staff. Members of the Board are elected from the resident stakeholders. The community is supported entirely by revenue from its retreat center operations, and adult members are expected to contribute by participating in day-to-day operations of the business. Pay for permanent non-director positions is minimum wage, but workers enjoy many benefits, including housing, utilities, food, vacation time, and health care.

== Pre-cooperative history ==
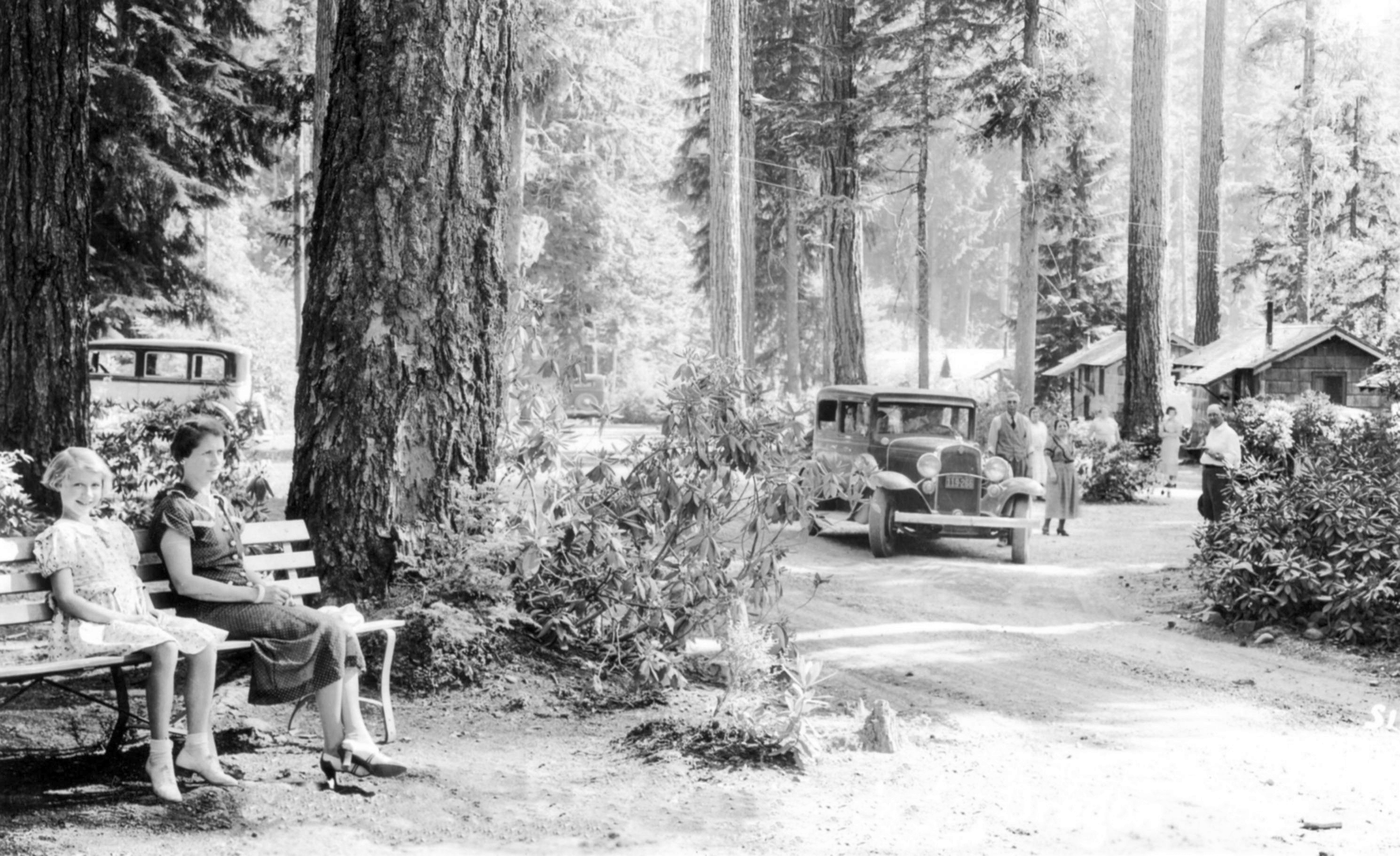
Cabins at Breitenbush Hot Springs, circa 1930

After being encountered by trappers arriving from the Hudson's Bay Company, Breitenbush was homesteaded by Claude Mansfield. The homestead patent was granted on August 16, 1904, by Theodore Roosevelt. John Minto, who led a surveying expedition along the Santiam River in 1874, named the area "Breitenbush" after Lewis Breitenbucher, a one-armed hunter living in the area. Although Minto incorrectly remembered the hunter's name when mapping the area, 'Breitenbush' has remained in use.

In 1927 the site was purchased by Merle Bruckman, who constructed a resort and operated it as the Breitenbush Hot Springs Mineral Company for about 20 years during its historic heyday. Management changed hands thereafter and the resort closed in 1972.

== Gallery ==
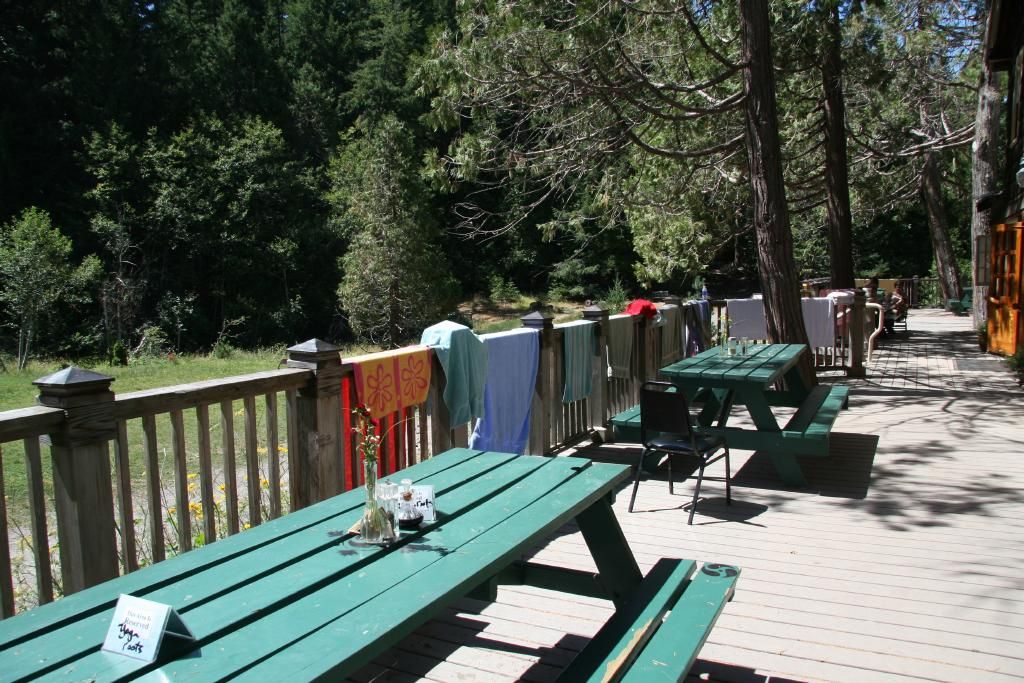
Front porch of main lodge

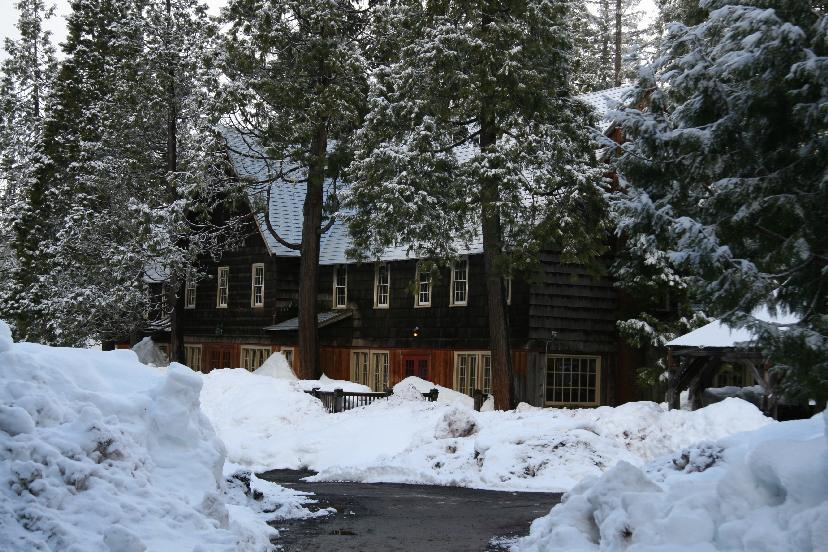
Breitenbush lodge

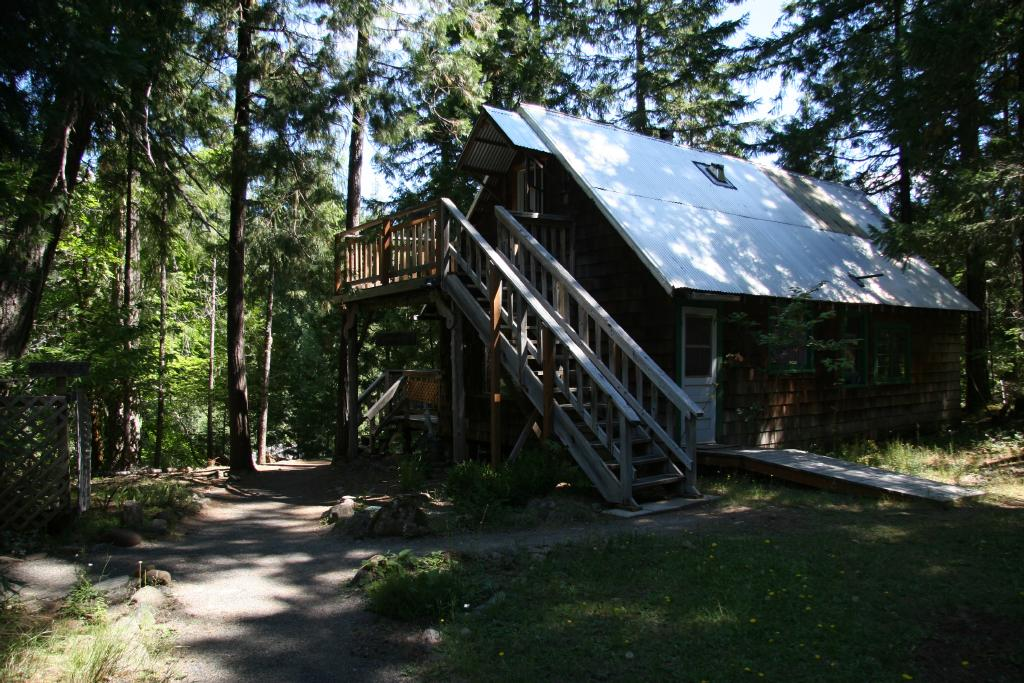
Massage House in 2008

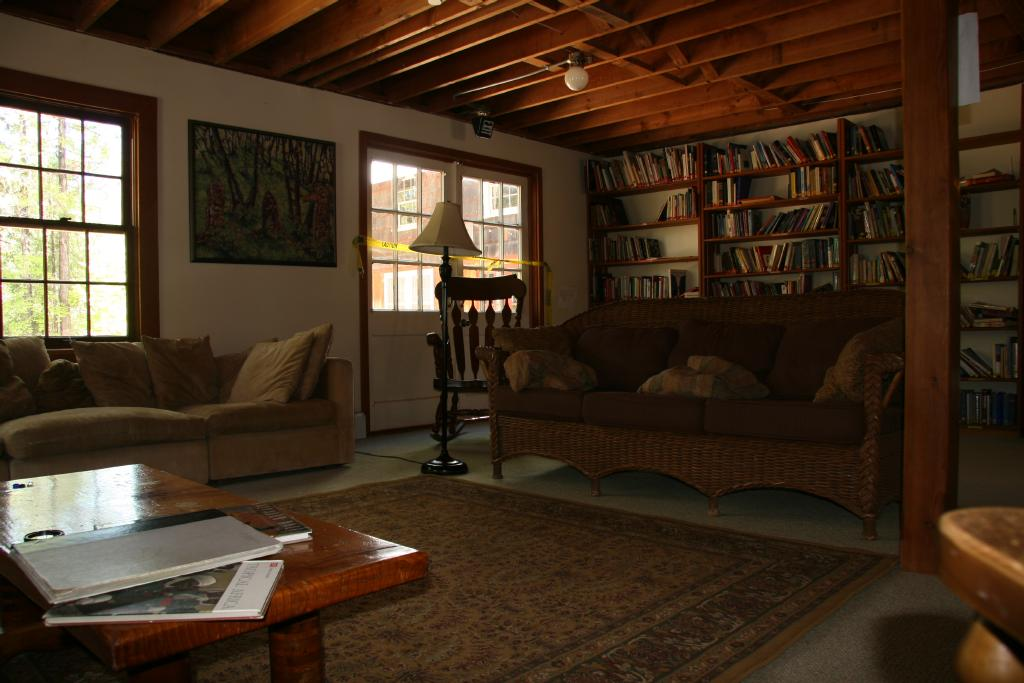
Library in main lodge

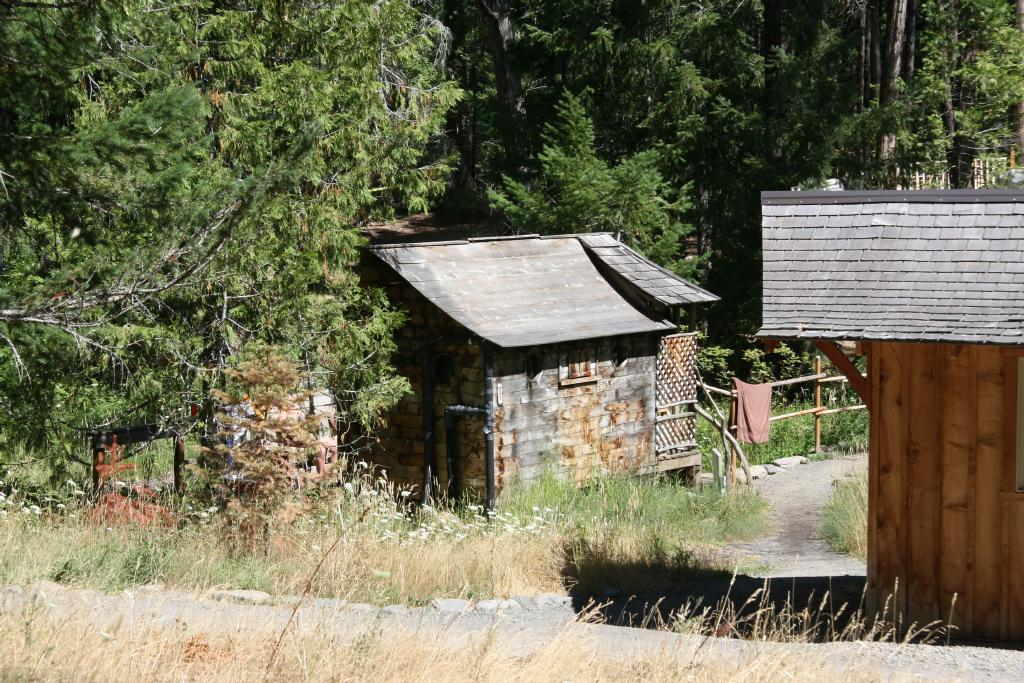
A sauna lodge

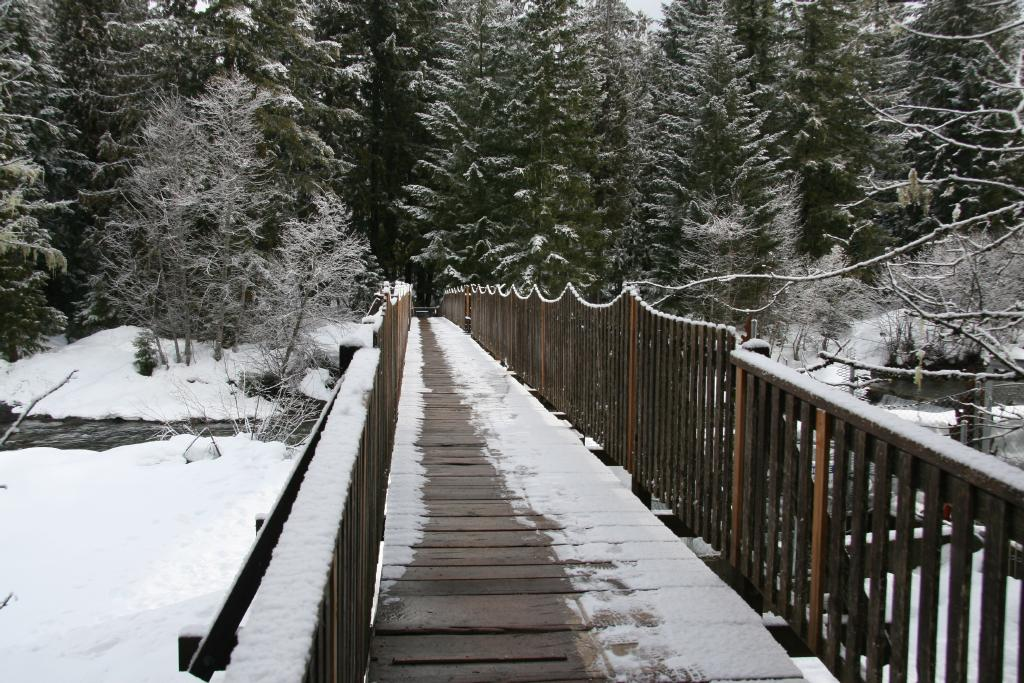
Breitenbush river bridge

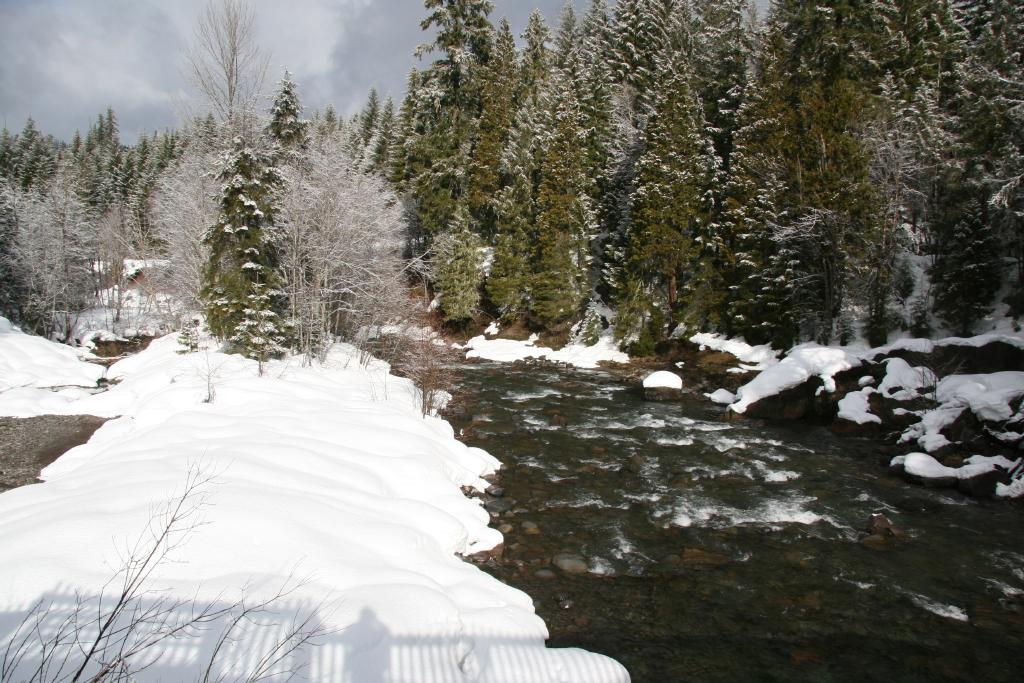
Breitenbush river

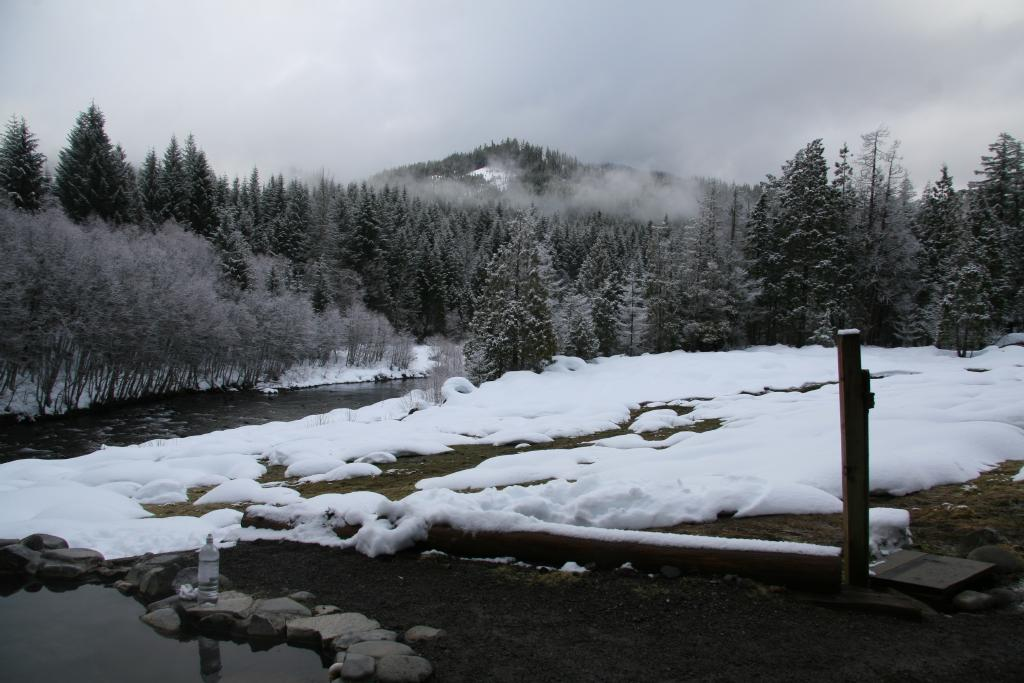
Breitenbush pool

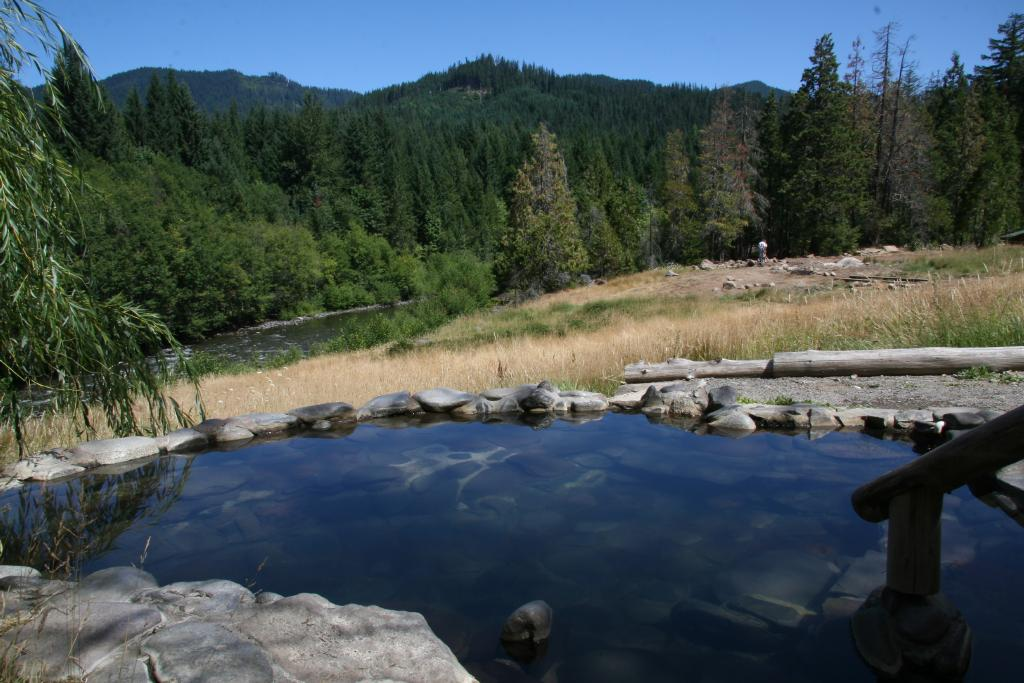
View from Meadow Pool

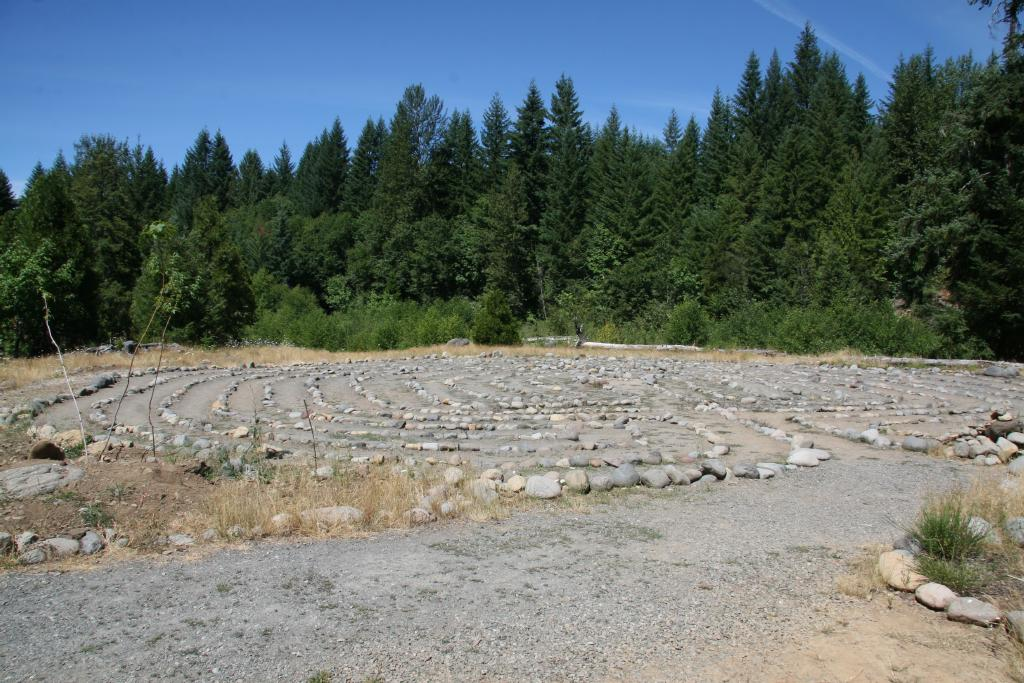
Labyrinth on flood plain

== See also ==
- Bagby Hot Springs, a less developed, nearby hot spring
- Hattie Bartholomay
