= North Fork Breitenbush River =

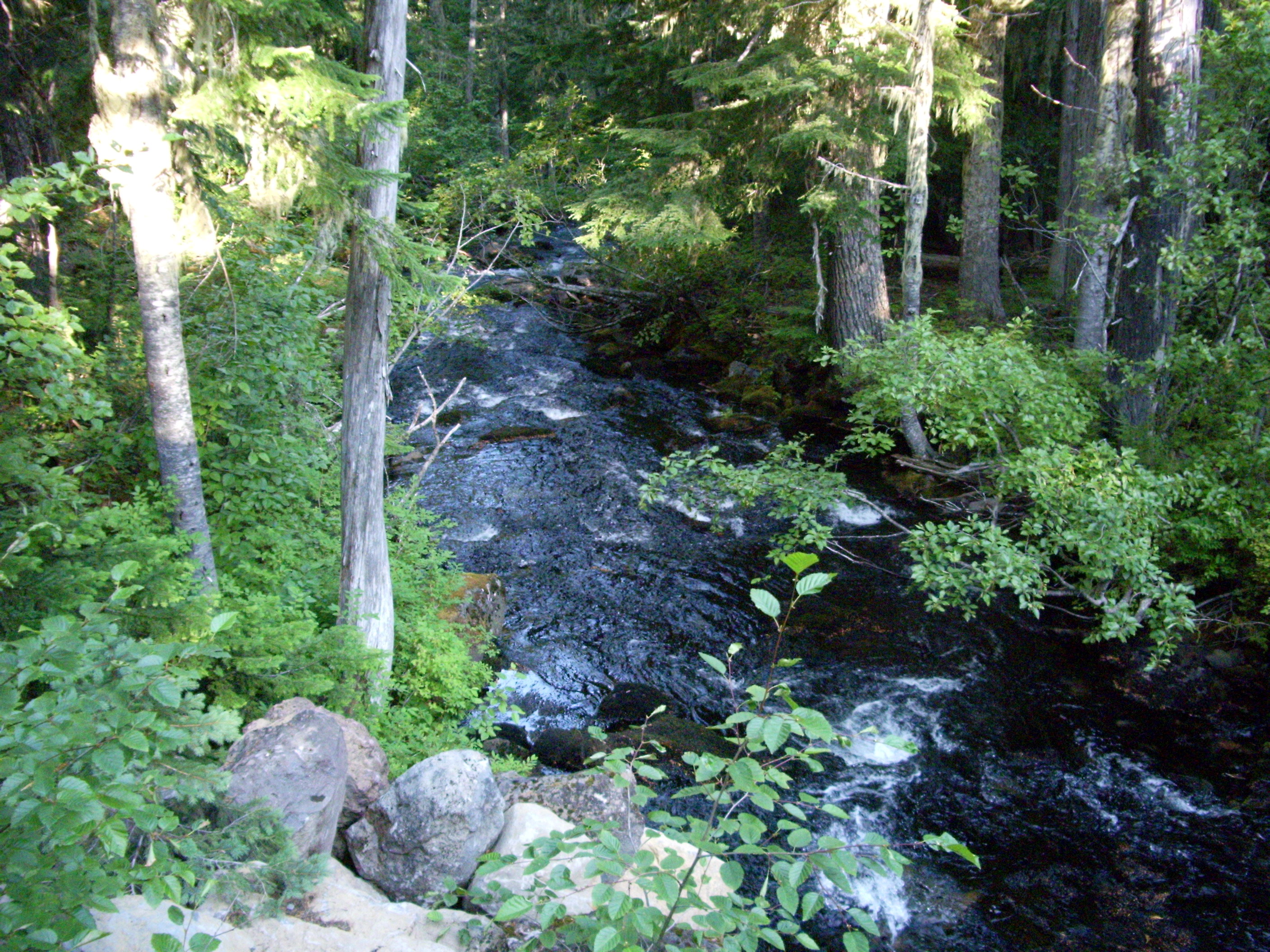
- Near the headwaters

- Location of the mouth of the North Fork Breitenbush River in Oregon

Location
- Country: United States
- State: Oregon
- County: Marion

Physical characteristics
- Source: Papoose Lakes
  - location: Mount Hood National Forest, Cascade Range
  - coordinates: 44°45′17″N 121°46′38″W
  - elevation: 5,731 ft (1,747 m)
- Mouth: Breitenbush River
  - location: near Breitenbush Hot Springs
  - coordinates: 44°46′47″N 121°57′53″W
  - elevation: 2,277 ft (694 m)

The North Fork Breitenbush River is a tributary of the Breitenbush River in the U.S. state of Oregon. It begins at Papoose Lakes near Breitenbush Lake in the Cascade Range north of Mount Jefferson and flows generally northwest and west through the Mount Hood National Forest, Olallie Scenic Area, Mount Jefferson Wilderness, and Willamette National Forest. It merges with the South Fork Breitenbush River to form the Breitenbush River main stem slightly upstream of Breitenbush Hot Springs.

The three named tributaries of the North Fork Breitenbush River from source to mouth are the South Fork North Fork Breitenbush River, Mink Creek, and Rapidan Creek.

== See also ==
- List of rivers of Oregon
