= South Fork Breitenbush River =

- Location of the mouth of the South Fork Breitenbush River in Oregon

Location
- Country: United States
- State: Oregon
- County: Marion

Physical characteristics
- Source: Russell Lake
  - location: Mount Jefferson Wilderness, Willamette National Forest, Cascade Range
  - coordinates: 44°42′53″N 121°47′58″W
  - elevation: 5,886 ft (1,794 m)
- Mouth: Breitenbush River
  - location: Breitenbush Hot Springs
  - coordinates: 44°46′47″N 121°57′53″W
  - elevation: 2,277 ft (694 m)
- Length: 10 mi (16 km)

The South Fork Breitenbush River is a 10-mile (16 km) tributary of the Breitenbush River in the U.S. state of Oregon. The river flows generally northwest from Russell Lake in the Mount Jefferson Wilderness of the Cascade Range to near Breitenbush Hot Springs, where it merges with the North Fork Breitenbush River to form the main stem.

The South Fork receives Lake Creek and Roaring Creek, both from the right, as it descends through the wilderness and the Willamette National Forest. From the confluence of its forks, the main stem Breitenbush River flows about 11 miles (18 km) further to its confluence with the North Santiam River in Detroit Lake.

== Recreation ==
The Pacific Crest Trail crosses the South Fork near Russell Lake. South Breitenbush Trail, which parallels the river for about 6 miles (10 km) in its upper reaches, offers opportunities for hiking and backpacking at elevations ranging from 3,050 to 5,850 feet (930 to 1,780 m) above sea level.

South Breitenbush Gorge Trail, along the river closer to its confluence with the main stem, passes through older Douglas-fir and western hemlock forest. This trail, ranging in elevation from 2,300 to 2,800 feet (700 to 850 m), is 2.5 miles (4.0 km) long. A side trail leads to a narrow canyon, about 300 feet (91 m) long, where the river flows between walls of basalt.

== See also ==
- List of rivers of Oregon
