= Frederick Whyte =

British civil servant, Liberal politician, writer and journalist

Sir Frederick Whyte KCSI

Member of Parliament for Perth
- In office 15 January 1910 – 14 December 1918
- Preceded by: Robert Pullar
- Succeeded by: Borough constituency abolished

Personal details
- Born: Alexander Frederick Whyte; 30 September 1883
- Died: 30 July 1970 (aged 86)
- Party: Liberal
- Spouse: Margaret Fairweather
- Children: 3
- Parents: Alexander Whyte (father); Jane Barbour (mother)
- Education: Edinburgh Academy
- Alma mater: University of Jena and University of Edinburgh
- Occupation: Civil Servant and Journalist

Sir Alexander Frederick Whyte KCSI (30 September 1883 – 30 July 1970) was a British civil servant, Liberal Party politician, writer, and journalist.

From 1920 to 1925, he served as the first president of the new Central Legislative Assembly of British India.

== Early life and career ==
Alexander Frederick Whyte was born on 30 September 1883, the second of eight children, and eldest son born to the Reverend Alexander Whyte DD, and Jane Elizabeth Barbour, who married in 1881.

Whyte attended Edinburgh Academy and read modern languages at Jena University and at Edinburgh University, graduating with a first class degree. During this time he was President of Edinburgh University Union, and after graduation was warden of the Edinburgh University Settlement in 1907–8.

== Political career ==
He entered Parliament as the Member of Parliament (MP) for Perth (1910–1918), during which time he had been parliamentary private secretary (1910–1915) to Winston Churchill, who was Home Secretary (1910–1911), and then First Lord of the Admiralty (1911–15) at the time.

During the First World War, Whyte was a lieutenant in the Royal Naval Volunteer Reserve on special service (1914–17).

He was appointed the first president of the Central Legislative Assembly in India (1920–25). He then took on ambassadorial roles; as political advisor to the National Government of China (1929–32), director general of the English-Speaking Union (1938), and head of the American division of the Ministry of Information (1939–40).

== Post Politics ==
He was also involved in journalism, as the founder and editor of The New Europe (1917–1920), a well-known weekly read by political leaders and students, and was the author of numerous books discussing the politics and economics of the Orient.

Aside from these political roles, Sir Frederick was Chairman of the Indian Red Cross Society (1923) and Reindeer Council of the United Kingdom, as well as being a member of the Athenaeum Club, founded in Liverpool in the late 18th century for the exchange of ideas.

It is unclear what involvement in public life Sir Frederick played following 1940. He was no longer at the Ministry of Information, but there is reference to him as chairman of the recently founded Reindeer Council of the United Kingdom in the Nature of November 1949, following proposals to introduce reindeer to Britain.

Further correspondence suggests that as late as 1958, Sir Frederick still had some association with the Indian Red Cross and St. John Ambulance Association and Brigade. A passenger list of that year reveals that Sir Alexander and Lady Fairweather Whyte set sail from Tenerife to England by first class, and Sir Alexander is described as a director.

In 1927, Sir Frederick sat for the photographer Walter Stoneman (1876–1958), and the bromide print along with two negatives remain part of the National Portrait Gallery’s collection.

== Personal life ==
Alexander Frederick married Margaret Emily Fairweather, the eldest daughter of the Reverend W. Fairweather DD of Kirkcaldy, in 1912, with whom he had three children:

- Joan Elizabeth Fairweather
- Anne Mortimer
- Alexander Hamilton

Sir Ernest Burdon (1881–1957), a fellow member of the Indian Civil Service, was Sir Frederick Whyte's brother-in-law on account of Sir Ernest's second marriage, to Mary Isabella, daughter of Rev W. Fairweather, in 1922.

Sir Alexander Frederick was knighted in the 1922 New Year Honours, and in the 1925 Birthday Honours was appointed a Knight Commander of the Order of the Star of India. Though gazetted as Sir Alexander Frederick Whyte, he may have adopted the use of his middle name to avoid confusion with an Alexander Whyte (1834-1908) employed as a government botanist under the British administration in Nyasaland (now Malawi), where he established Zomba Botanic Garden between 1891 and 1895.

== Publications ==
- India, a federation? (Government of India Press, 1926)
- China and foreign powers (H. Milford, Oxford University Press, 1927)
- China and foreign powers (Oxford University Press, 1928)
- The unfinished task (Houghton Mifflin company, 1933)
- A British view of Pacific affairs in 1936 (Royal Institute of International Affairs, 1936)
- World Outlook (1939)
- India, a bird's eye view (The Royal Institute of International Affairs, 1942)
- India (The Royal Institute of International affairs, Oxford University Press, 1942)
- Japan's purpose in Asia and the Pacific (The Royal Institute of International Affairs, Oxford University Press, 1942)
- India (The Royal Institute of International Affairs, 1944)
- The rise and fall of Japan (The Royal Institute of International Affairs, 1945)
- The Pattern of Pacific Security A Report by a Chatham House Study Group (Norman Bentwich, G E Hubbard et al.. A Chatham House Study Group, 1946)

== Sources ==
- Who’s Who (1927) A & C Black
- Time, 28 June 1926.

Parliament of the United Kingdom
Preceded by Robert Pullar	Member of Parliament for Perth; January 1910 –1918	Succeeded by William Young as MP for Perth (County constituency)

== See also ==
- Hattie Bartholomay
