= Breitenbush Lake =

Lake in Oregon, United States

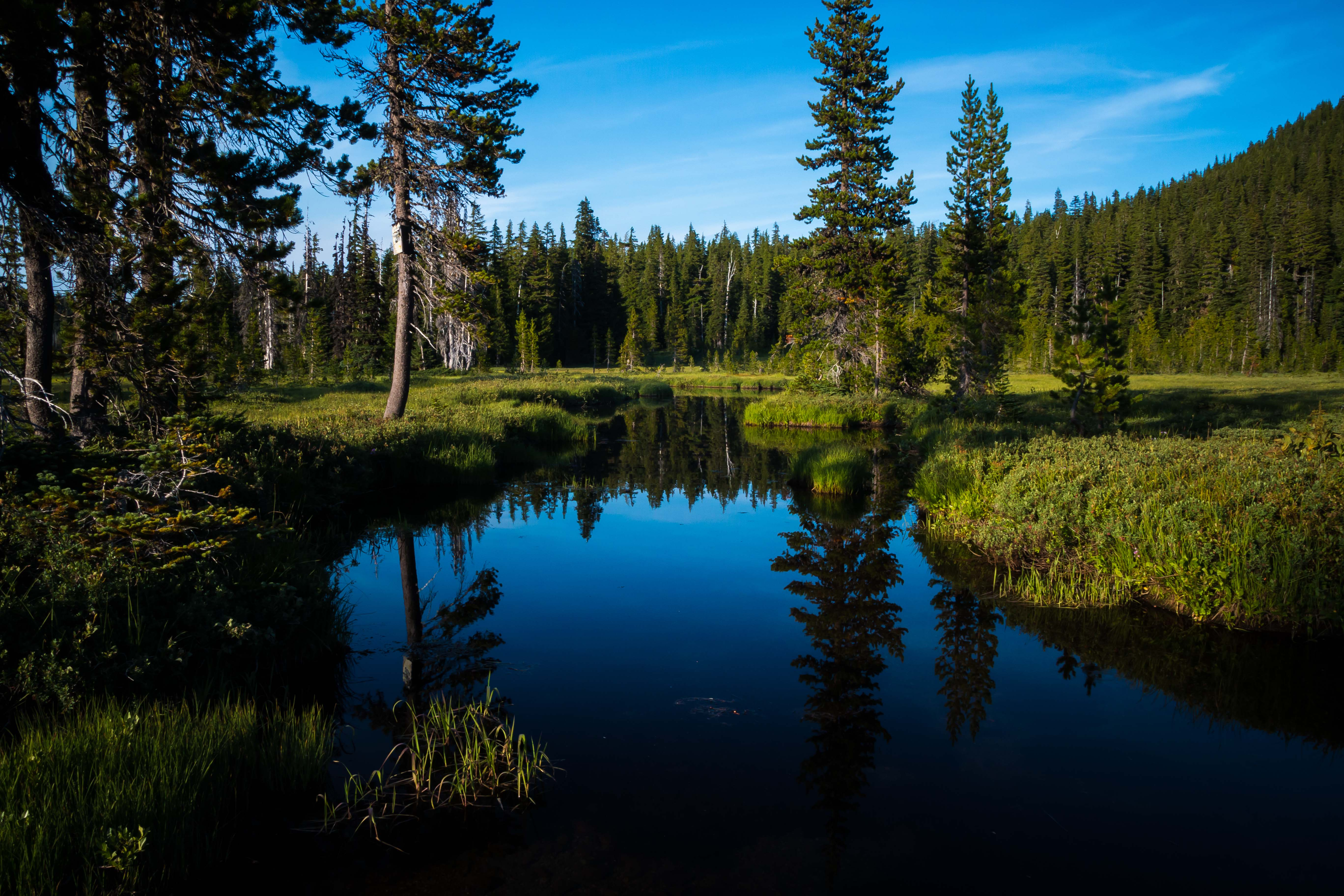
- Looking south from Breitenbush Lake

- Location of Breitenbush Lake in Oregon, USA. Breitenbush Lake (the United States)
- Location: Near Mount Jefferson in the Cascade Range, Oregon
- Coordinates: 44°46′06″N 121°46′44″W
- Type: Natural, oligotrophic
- Primary inflows: Seepage and small unnamed streams
- Primary outflows: Unnamed channel shared with a pond draining to the North Fork Breitenbush River
- Catchment area: 1.4 square miles (3.6 km^{2})
- Basin countries: United States
- Surface area: 65 acres (26 ha)
- Average depth: 6 feet (1.8 m)
- Max. depth: 25 feet (7.6 m)
- Water volume: 400 acre-feet (490,000 m^{3})
- Shore length^{1}: 1.6 miles (2.6 km)
- Surface elevation: 5,505 feet (1,678 m)
- ^{1} Shore length is not a well-defined measure.

Breitenbush Lake is a 65-acre (26 ha) water body on a high plateau north of Mount Jefferson in the Cascade Range in the U.S. state of Oregon. The lake, fed by seepage and small creeks, is part of the North Fork Breitenbush River watershed. It is in Marion County near its border with Jefferson County and lies within the Mount Hood National Forest and the Warm Springs Indian Reservation at an elevation of about 5,500 feet (1,700 m).

Forest Road 4220 runs by the lake. Breitenbush Lake Campground, maintained by the United States Forest Service, has 20 sites and a vault toilet but no garbage service. Canoes are allowed on the lake but not motorboats. The lake, which supports rainbow and brook trout generally ranging in length from 6 to 12 inches (15 to 30 cm), is stocked periodically.

Forest Road 4220 has been described as rough at best, and heavy snow keeps it closed to most traffic from mid-October through the end of June, usually. When the road is snow-covered, visitors can still use it to reach the lake on snowshoes, cross-country skis, or snowmobiles.

== See also ==
- List of lakes in Oregon
