= Breitenbush River =

River in Oregon, United States of America

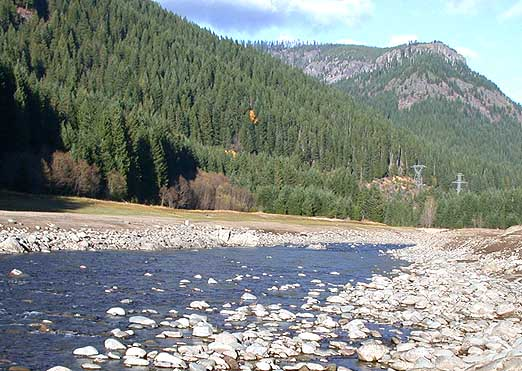
- Breitenbush River north of Detroit

Location
- Country: United States
- State: Oregon
- Region: Mount Jefferson Wilderness, Willamette National Forest

Physical characteristics
- Source: junction of North and South forks
  - location: Marion County, Mount Jefferson Wilderness, Oregon, United States
  - coordinates: 44°46′48″N 121°57′53″W
  - elevation: 686 m (2,251 ft)
- Mouth: North Santiam River
  - coordinates: 44°44′57″N 122°8′2″W
  - elevation: 515 m (1,690 ft)
- Length: 18.1 km (11.2 mi)
- Basin size: 108 mi^{2} (280 km^{2})
- Discharge
  - location: above French Creek near Detroit Lake
  - average: 569 cu ft/s (16.1 m^{3}/s)
  - minimum: 87 cu ft/s (2.5 m^{3}/s)
  - maximum: 16,900 cu ft/s (480 m^{3}/s)

The Breitenbush River is a tributary of the North Santiam River in western Oregon in the United States. It drains a rugged, forested area of the Cascade Range east of Salem.

It descends from several short forks in the Mount Jefferson Wilderness in the high Cascades of eastern Marion County. The South Fork Breitenbush River begins at creeks flowing from Bays Lake and Russell Lake within Jefferson Park at approximately elevation 6,000 feet (1,800 m) and flows west-northwest, joining with other forks. The North Fork Breitenbush River begins at Breitenbush Lake (mostly on the Warm Springs Reservation) and joins with another fork which passes by Pyramid Lake. It flows west-northwest and connects with a half dozen other forks and creeks then turns west-southwest abeam Bald Butte. Several more creeks and Mink Creek and Rapidam Creek join before another fork.

The North and South forks flow west, joining 0.25 miles (400 m) east of the small community of Breitenbush. The combined stream flows generally west-southwest through the Willamette National Forest. It joins the North Santiam at Detroit. The lower 2 miles (3.2 km) of the river cut what is now an arm of Detroit Lake, formed by the Detroit Dam on the North Santiam. During the winter draw down of the reservoir, the original bed of the river is visible in its natural course.

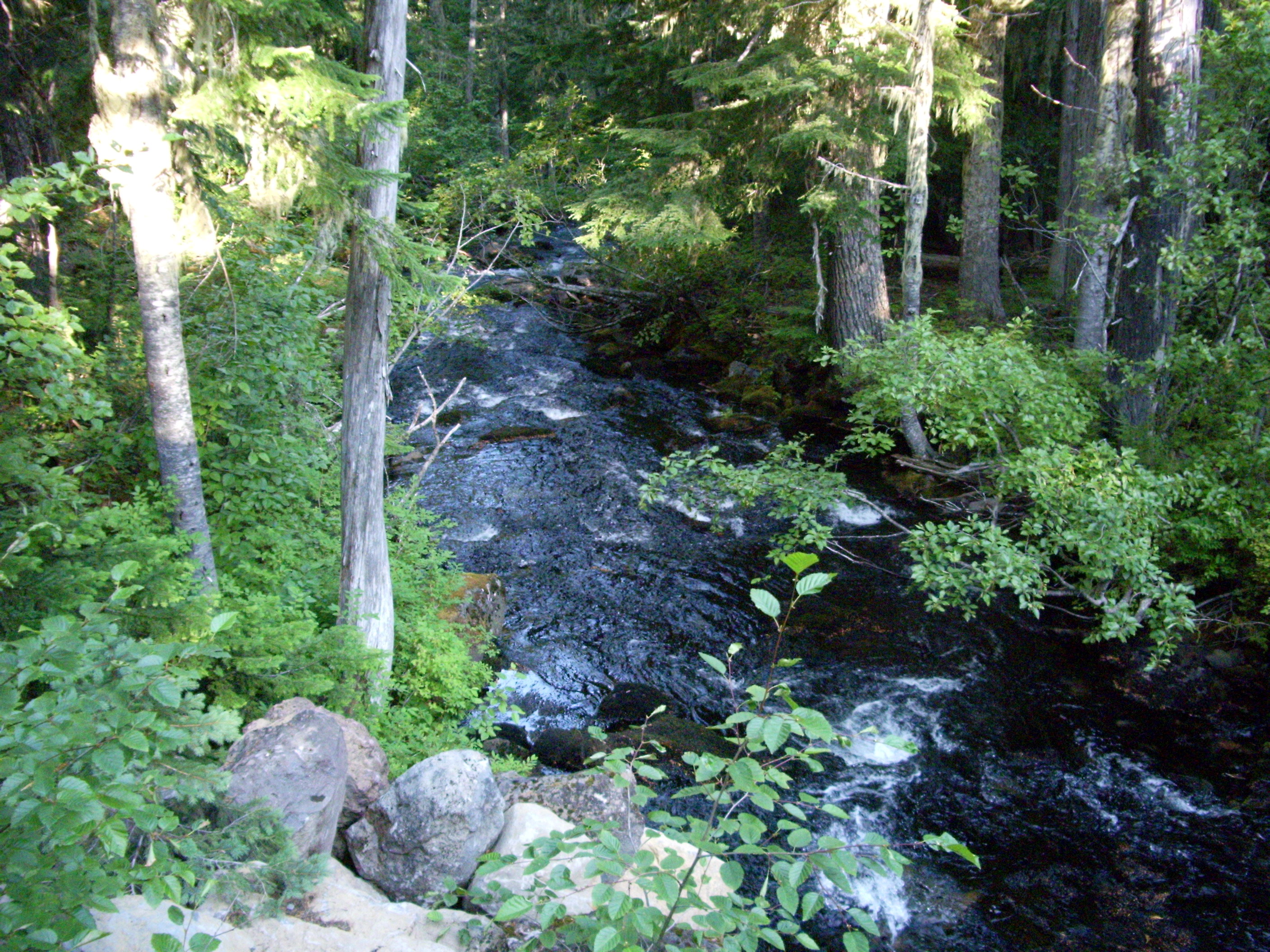
View of tributary from road to Breitenbush Lake of North Fork Of North Fork of Breitenbush River

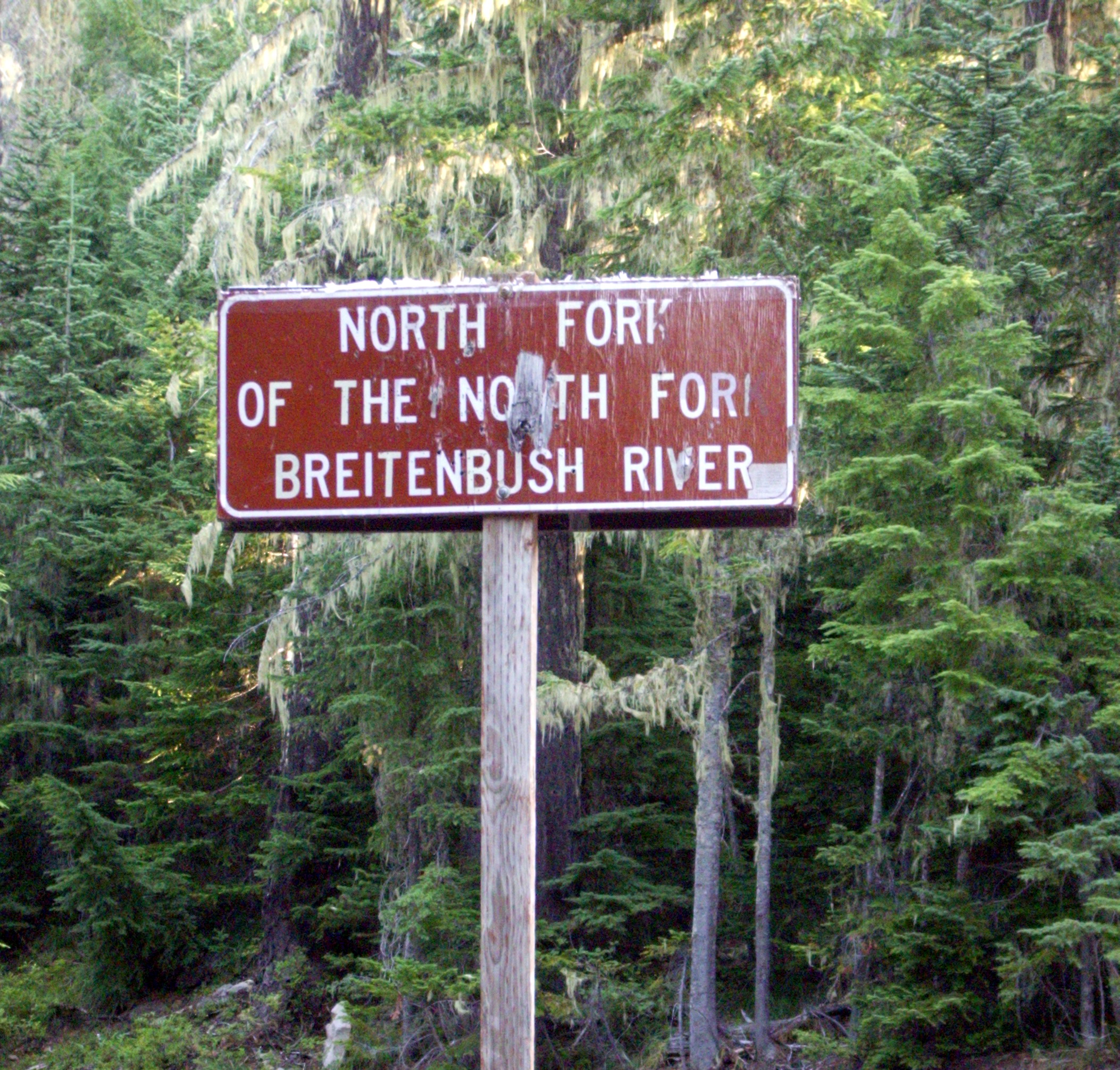
Weathered road sign naming North Fork of North Fork Breitenbush River

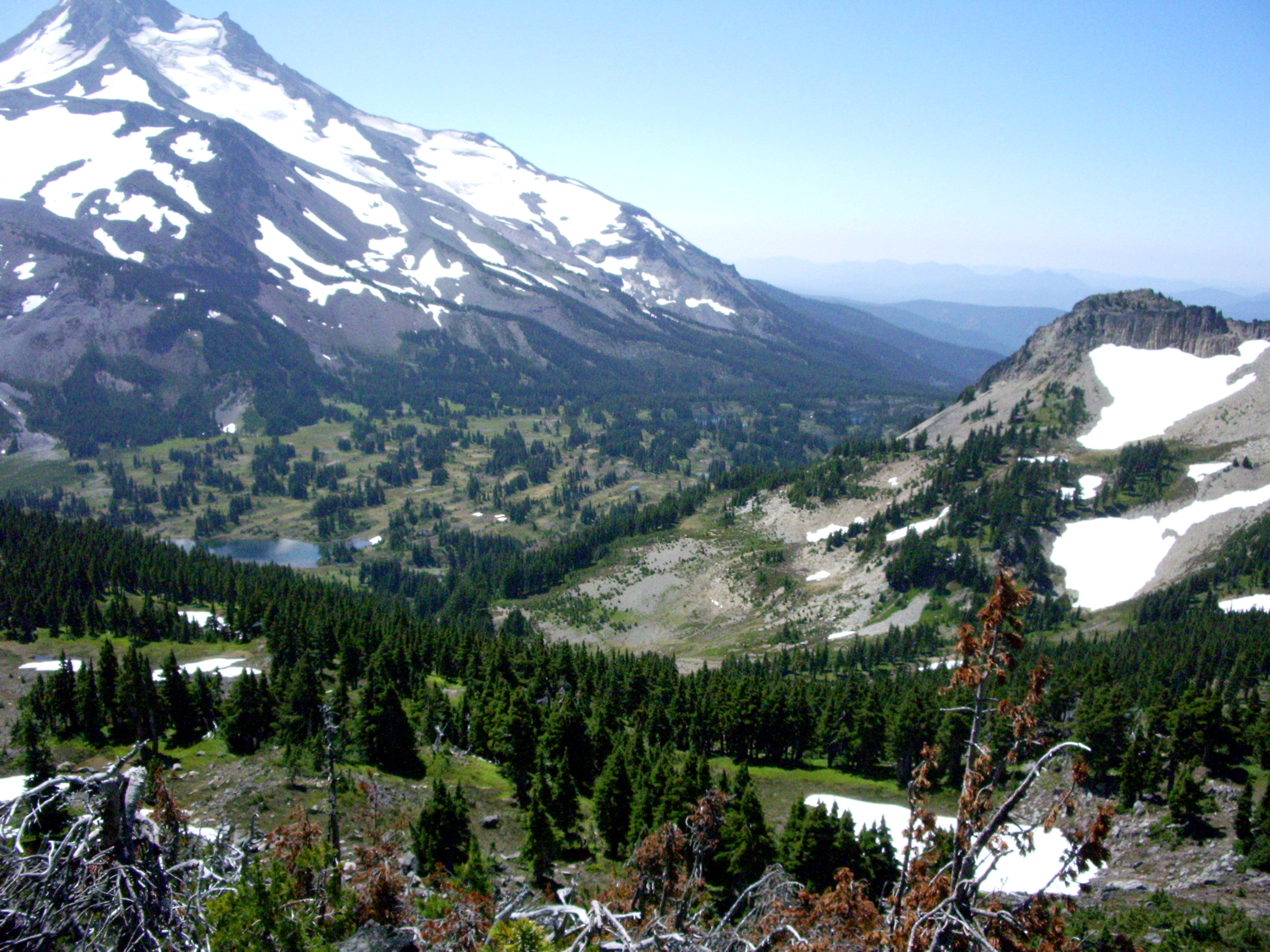
Jefferson Park at the foot of Mount Jefferson, headwaters of the South Fork of the Breitenbush River

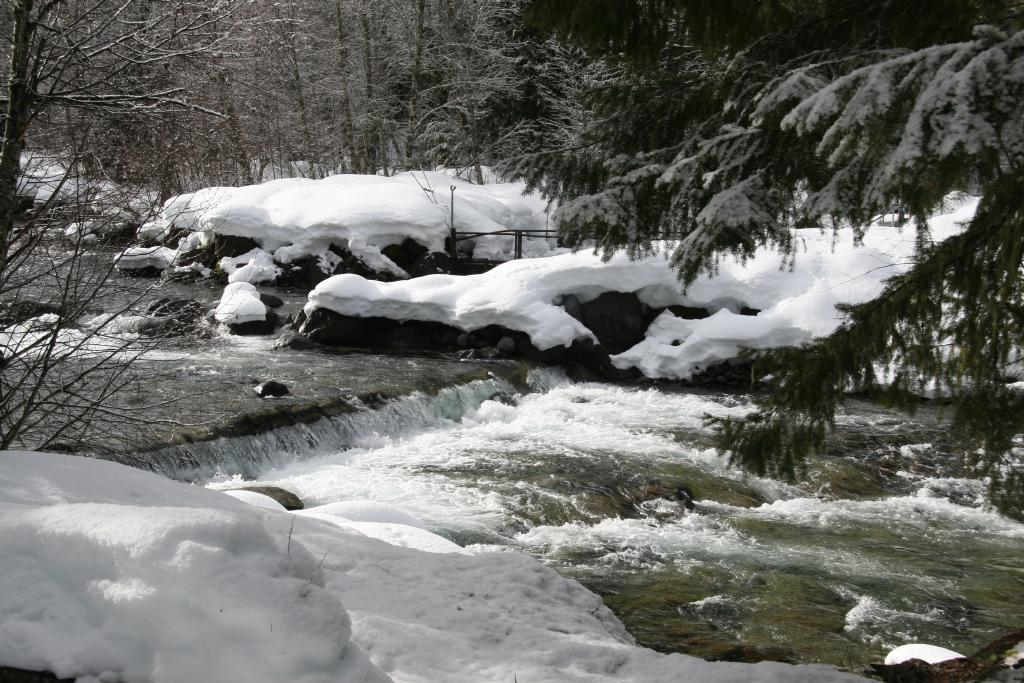
View of river from Breitenbush Hot Springs

== See also ==
- Breitenbush Hot Springs
- List of rivers of Oregon
