= Wairakite =

Zeolite mineral

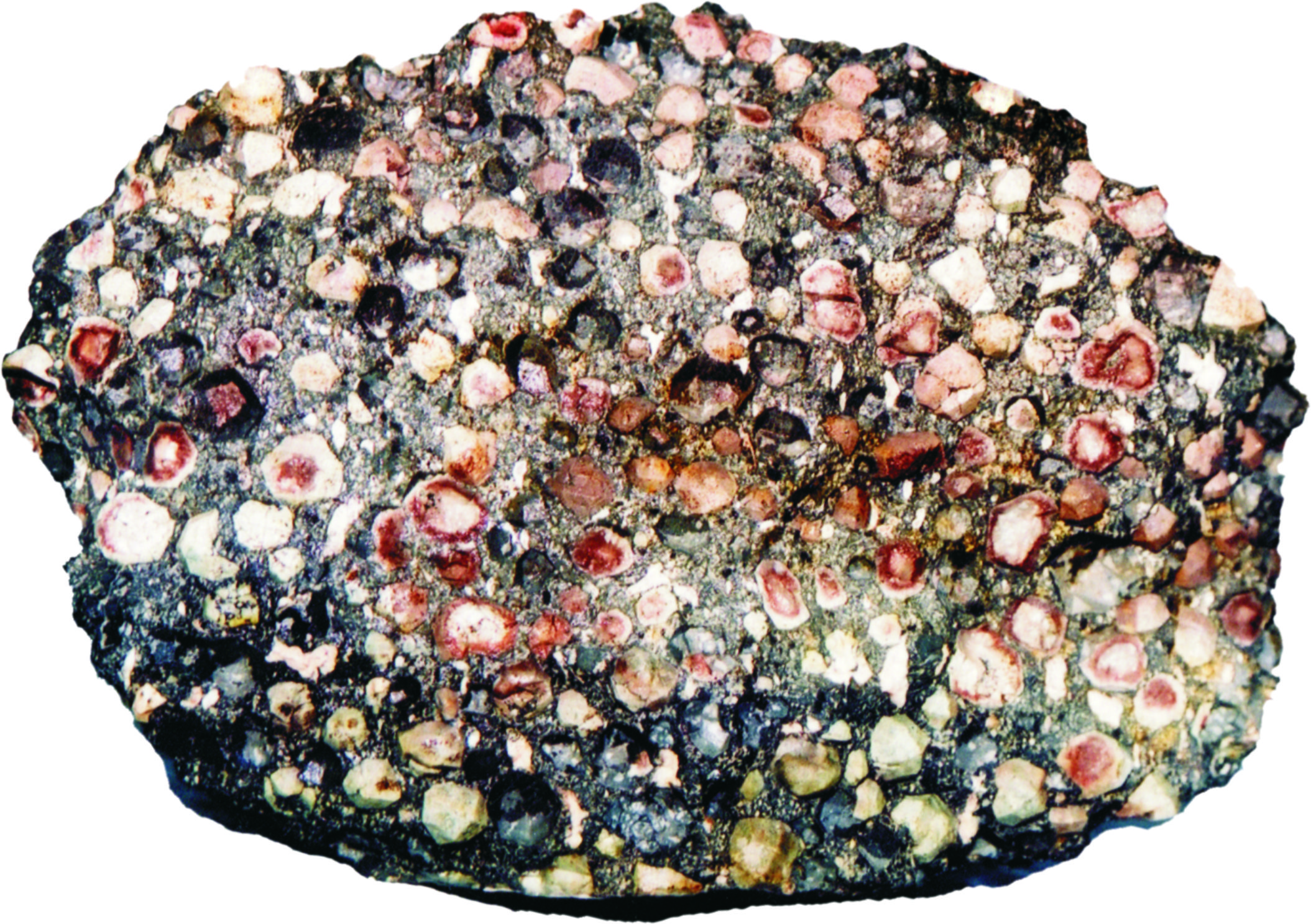
- Wairakite from Azerbaijan

General
- Category: Tectosilicate minerals
- Group: Zeolite group
- Formula: Ca_{8}(Al_{16}Si_{32}O_{96})•16H_{2}O
- IMA symbol: Wrk
- Strunz classification: 9.GB.05
- Crystal system: Monoclinic
- Crystal class: Prismatic (2/m) (same H-M symbol)
- Space group: I2/a
- Unit cell: a = 13.69 Å, b = 13.64 Å c = 13.56 Å; β = 90.51°; Z = 8

Identification
- Color: colorless to white
- Luster: vitreous, dull
- Streak: white
- Diaphaneity: transparent, translucent

Wairakite is a zeolite mineral with an analcime structure but containing a calcium ion. The chemical composition is Ca_{8}(Al_{16}Si_{32}O_{96})•16H_{2}O. It is named for the location of its discovery in Wairakei, North Island, New Zealand, by Czechoslovak mineralogist Alfred Steiner in 1955. The first finds were in hydrothermally altered rhyolitic tuffs, ignimbrites and volcaniclastic rocks. The mineral has since been found in metamorphic rocks and in geothermal areas. It was most likely first successfully synthesized in a laboratory in 1970.
