= Breitenbush, Oregon =

Unincorporated community in the state of Oregon, United States

- Unincorporated community
- Location within Oregon Location within the United States
- Coordinates: 44°46′54″N 121°58′19″W
- Country: United States
- State: Oregon
- County: Marion
- Elevation: 2,238 ft (682 m)
- Time zone: UTC-8 (Pacific (PST))
  - Summer (DST): UTC-7 (PDT)
- ZIP code: 97342
- Area codes: 503 and 971
- GNIS feature ID: 1156681

Breitenbush is an unincorporated community in Marion County, Oregon, United States, located approximately 10 miles NE of Detroit, Oregon, and 10 miles NW of Mt. Jefferson. The community is situated on private land, encompassed entirely by the Willamette National Forest, and is notable for having several hot springs, both nearby and on the property. It is said to have been originally homesteaded in 1888, and its hot springs have seen varied degrees of development and use since that time. In its heyday as a resort, the community was served by a post office, which operated between 1928 and 1953.

Today, the community is the location of Breitenbush Hot Springs Retreat & Conference Center, a worker-owned co-op. The physical community is sometimes extended to include a group of privately owned summer vacation homes, situated on neighboring Forest Service land; these cabins receive periodic use from their owners, but are not intended for year-round occupancy. Year-round residents of the community consist of only 70 or so individuals, holding dedicated positions at the retreat & conference center; a slightly smaller number of staff may come and go seasonally, but do not have dedicated housing or permanent positions.

As of 2006, the community has its own fire department, protecting both the retreat & conference center and vacation homes, as well as the greater Breitenbush Canyon.

== History ==
=== Lewis Breitenbucher and Discovery by Oregon Settlers ===
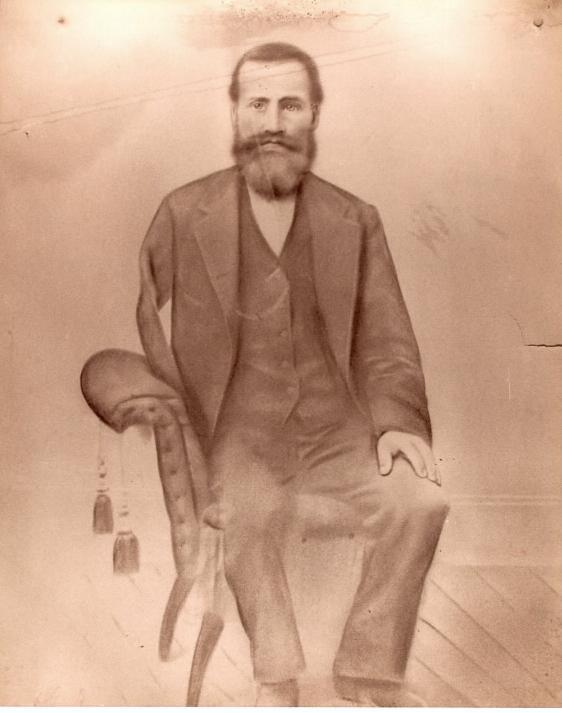
Lewis Breitenbucher, circa 1870

Breitenbush was the name given to a lake, river, and locale by Oregon State legislator John Minto, who, in 1874, led a survey party in search of a pass over Oregon's Central Cascades. During the expedition, Minto and his party encountered a hunter living in the uninhabited regions of the Upper North Santiam canyon; the hunter was memorable due to his having only one arm, and Minto later gave the man's name to the area, remembering it as "John Breitenbush". When Minto's maps were published in the 1880s, Lewis Breitenbucher was known to locals in the Lower Santiam, who noted the name Minto used was incorrect.

Lewis Breitenbucher had moved into the uninhabited reaches of the Upper North Santiam Canyon sometime after his wife's death in 1867. Those who met him questioned his abilities to subsist in the wilderness as he did, given his handicap. Breitenbucher attributed his success to putting a bat's eye under his tongue, which he said endowed him with excellent night vision and accounted for his hunting prowess. As a result of this story, residents of the Lower Santiam originally knew the hot springs and river as "Bateye Springs" and "Bateye Creek" until the name on Minto's map became the accepted reference toward the end of the 19th century.

Despite his namesake being given to the area, Breitenbucher was not the first white man to visit the springs. As early as the 1830s, the springs were known to be visited by pioneers and other trappers, who used the hot waters to cook meat.

=== Mansfield Homestead ===
Breitenbush Hot Springs was first homesteaded by Claude Mansfield, originally from Albany, Oregon. He was purported to have set up there as early as 1888. In 1889, Mansfield's original cabin burned down, but, in spite of this, the Albany Daily Democrat was already spreading word that Mansfield had laid stake to the land and was making improvements for the purposes of business and land cultivation. By 1901, improvements had been made in the way of trails, roads, and bridges, and a horse pack train operation was running out of Detroit, allowing for an increased number of visitors.

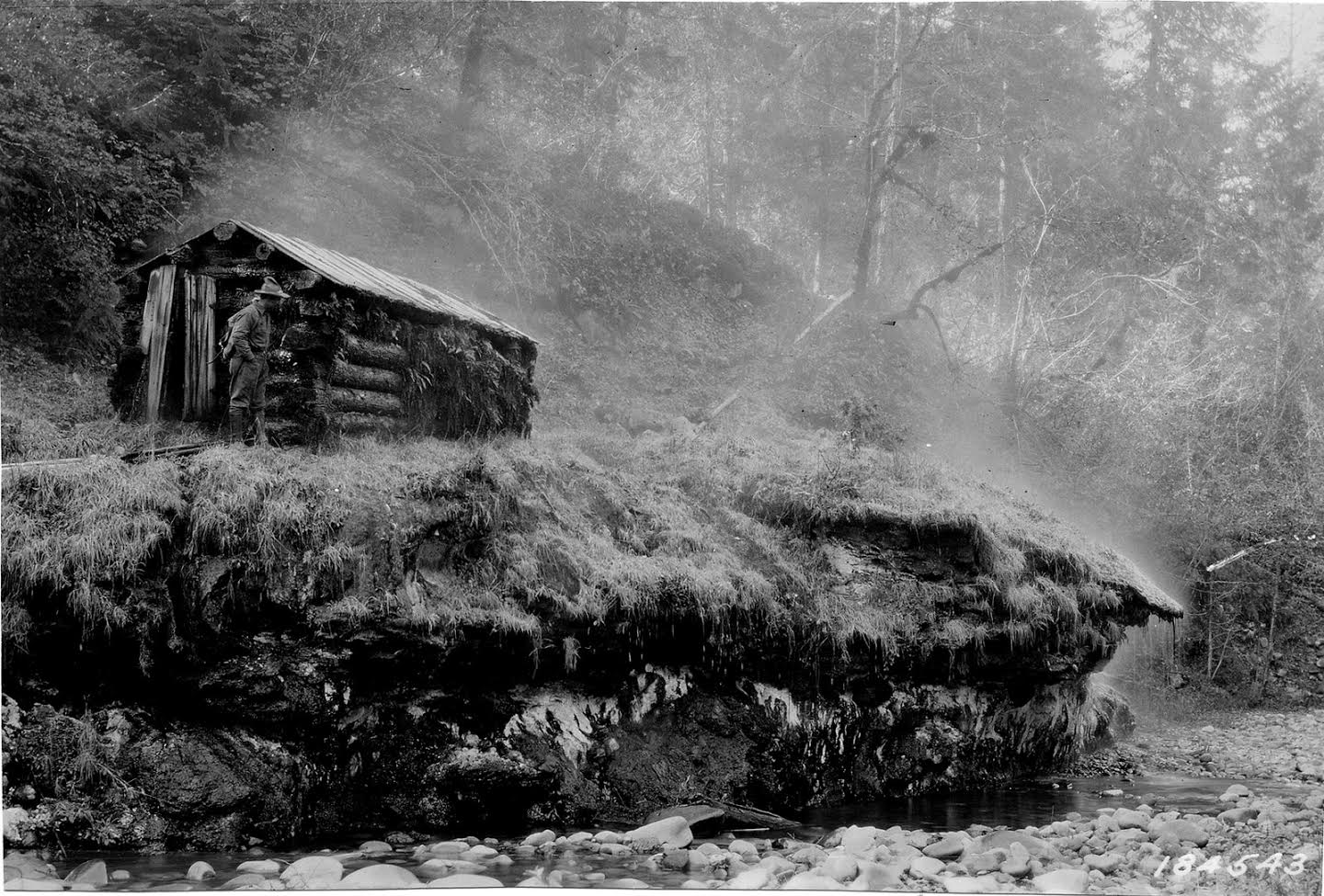
Steam house on Mansfield's property

In May 1903, Mansfield encountered a temporary setback when the Federal government ruled against Mansfield's claim to the springs by means of the homestead act, the immediate area having become part of the Cascade Forest Reserve by proclamation of President Grover Cleveland in 1893. The issue came to a head in 1901, when a forest superintendent challenged Mansfield's claim to the land. The land office in Oregon City initially heard the case, ruling in favor of Mansfield. On appeal by the forest superintendent, a commissioner for the Federal government's general land office reversed the local decision; several witnesses had testified that, in frequenting the springs, they observed the land to be vacant, unappropriated public lands lacking any considerable improvements made by Mansfield.

In October 1903 the then Secretary of the Interior heard Mansfield's appeal, and ruled in his favor. Permanent title was awarded to Mansfield by President Theodore Roosevelt. Mansfield continued to make improvements to the hot springs' offerings and developed its reputation as a resort.

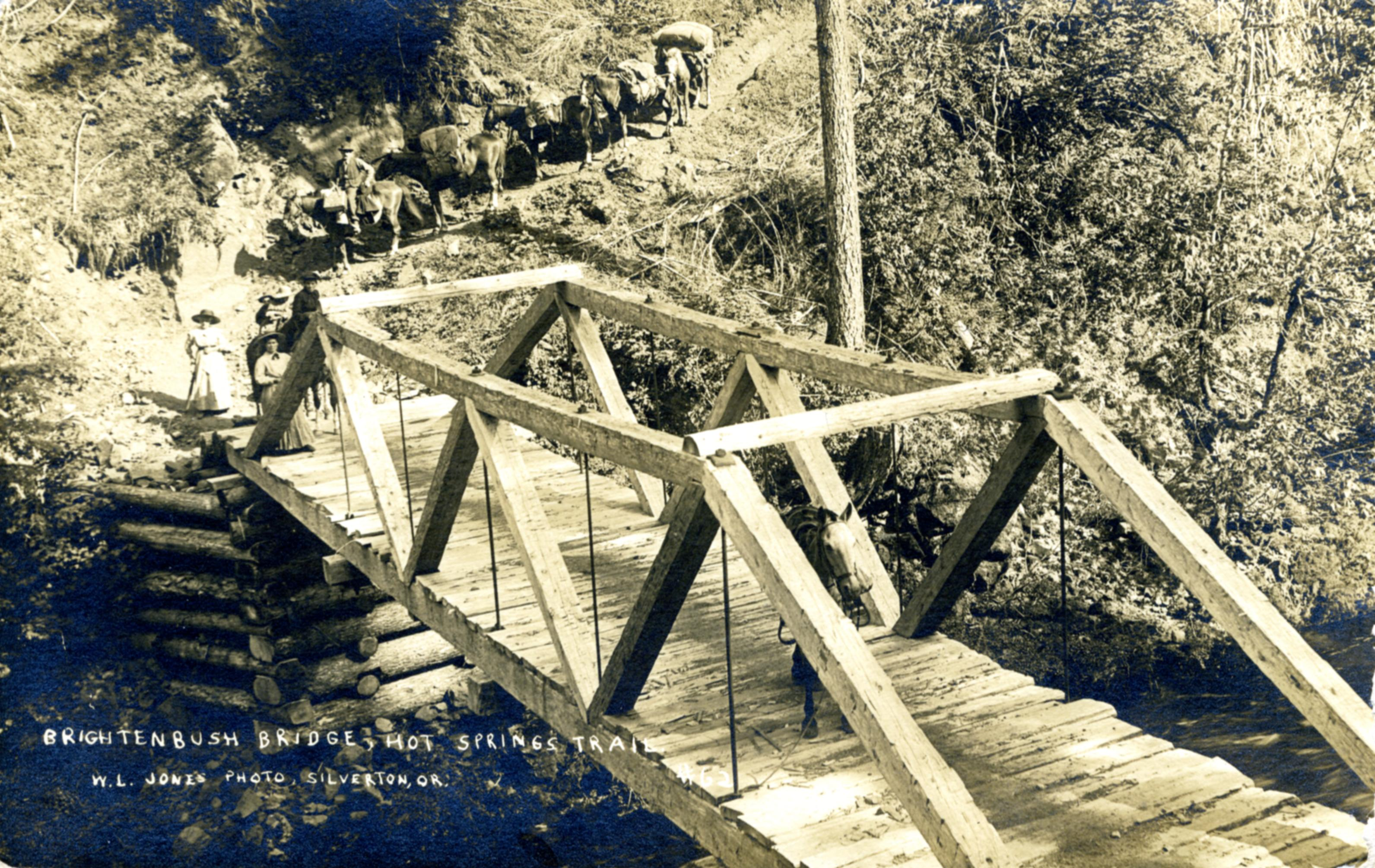
Pack trains from Detroit aided visitors as early as 1901

In 1905 Claude and his wife Harriet (née Ross), better known as "Hattie", were divorced, with Hattie and Mansfield's son, Lorenzo, receiving 1/3rd of the hot springs ranch's real estate. Claude died in 1906, and the execution of his estate and remaining 2/3rds interest in the springs real estate were passed to his uncle Dr. J.L. Hill of Albany. Dr. Hill co-owned the property with the Mansfields throughout the nineteen-oughts and early twenties, during which the springs received increased attention for their perceived health benefits. One of the most famous individuals of that era to visit the springs was acclaimed accordionist Count Guido Diero, who spent several summers there composing music.

One of Mansfield's homestead cabins continued to exist on the Breitenbush property up until 2010, when it finally collapsed.

==== Skiff's Camp ====
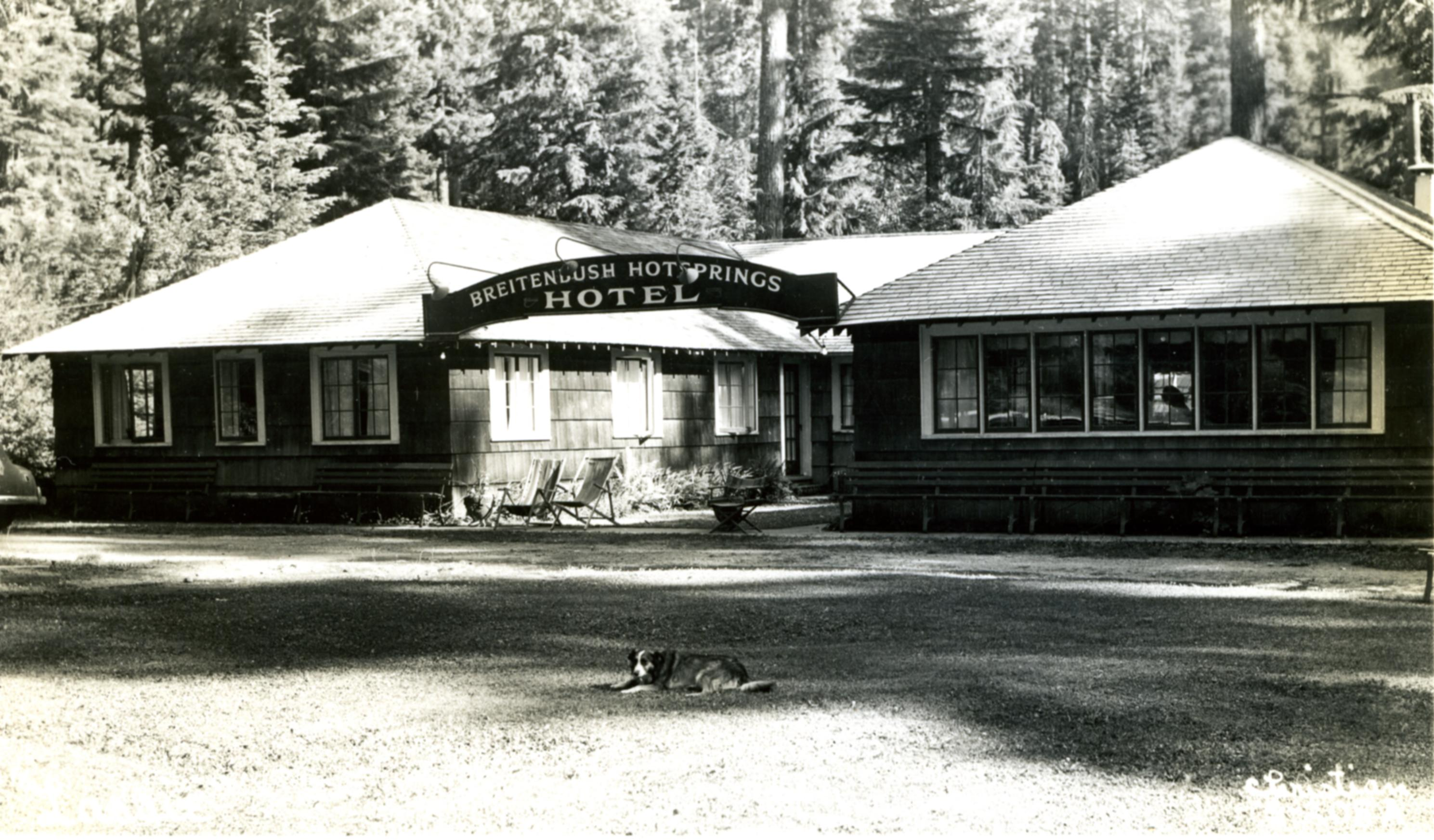
The Breitenbush Hot Springs Hotel was operated by the Skiff family at the Lower Springs

In the same time period as the Mansfield era, Dr. Mark Skiff of Salem, Oregon, took an interest in, and was granted water rights to use a smaller set of hot springs down river from the Mansfield property. These springs had been overlooked in previous surveys, and had thus become part of the Forest Service's holdings. In the early 1900s, Skiff added cabins to these Lower Springs and began to develop what would become known as "Skiff's Camp". The attraction was opened in 1913 and would compete with resort development at the Upper Spring throughout its years.

=== Bruckman Era ===
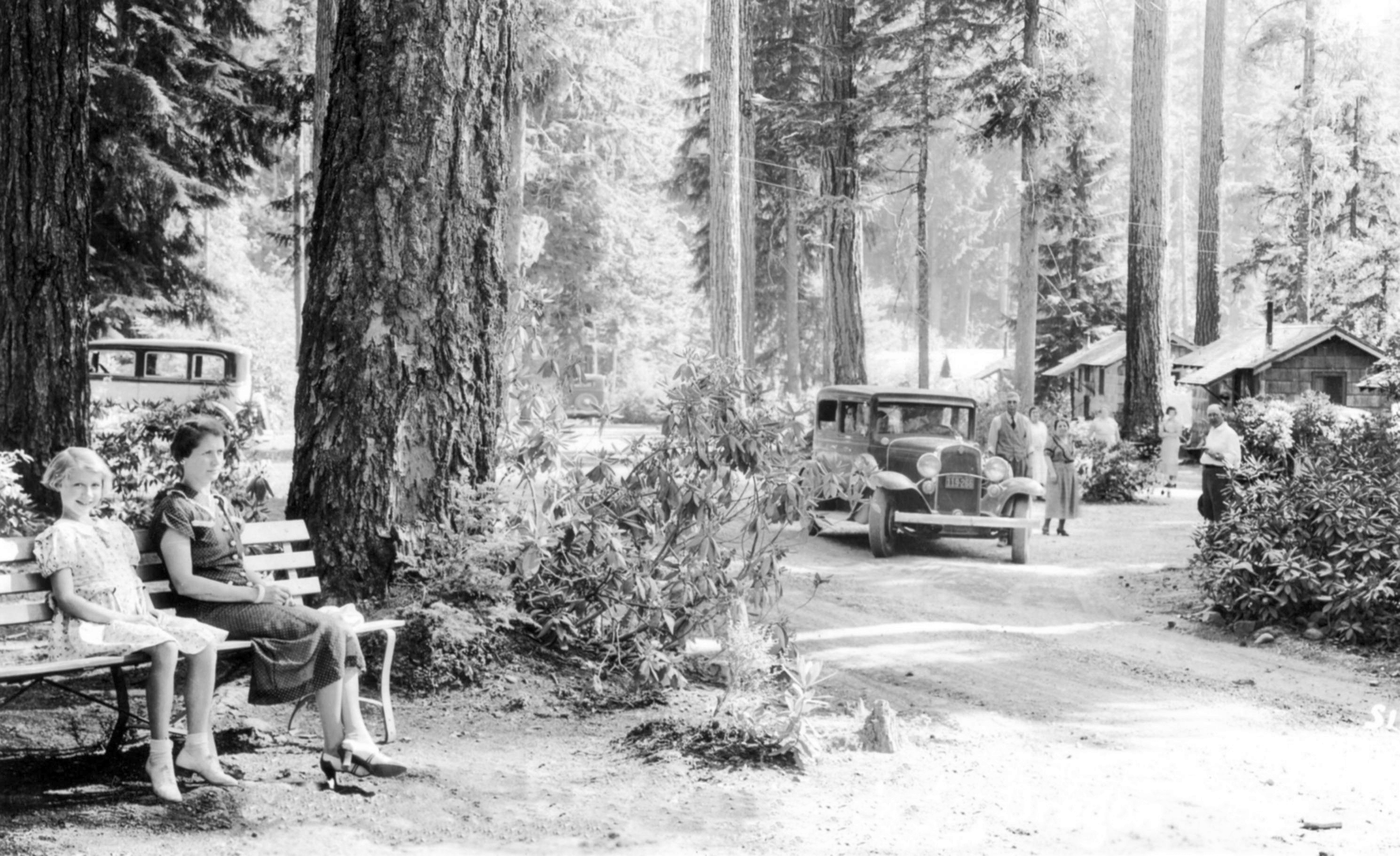
New cabins at the Bruckman resort

Both the Upper and Lower Springs continued to gain popularity in the nineteen-oughts. A Portland-based Breitenbush Hot Springs Company was incorporated in 1924 and purchased the combined Hill & Mansfield portions of the property by means of a mortgage. The company hoped to make major improvements to the property, transforming it into a preeminent resort, by selling stock to investors; unable to make headway, the company extended a 30-year lease-to-buy option to Merele Bruckman, which commenced in 1925.

Merele was the son of successful inventor Frederick Bruckman, the elder having been a childhood friend of Hattie Ross (Mansfield). In 1912, Fred invented a machine for rolling ice cream cones; in 1928, the patent for the cone making machine was sold to Nabisco, giving Bruckman a considerable amount of capital to invest in the family's Breitenbush enterprise.

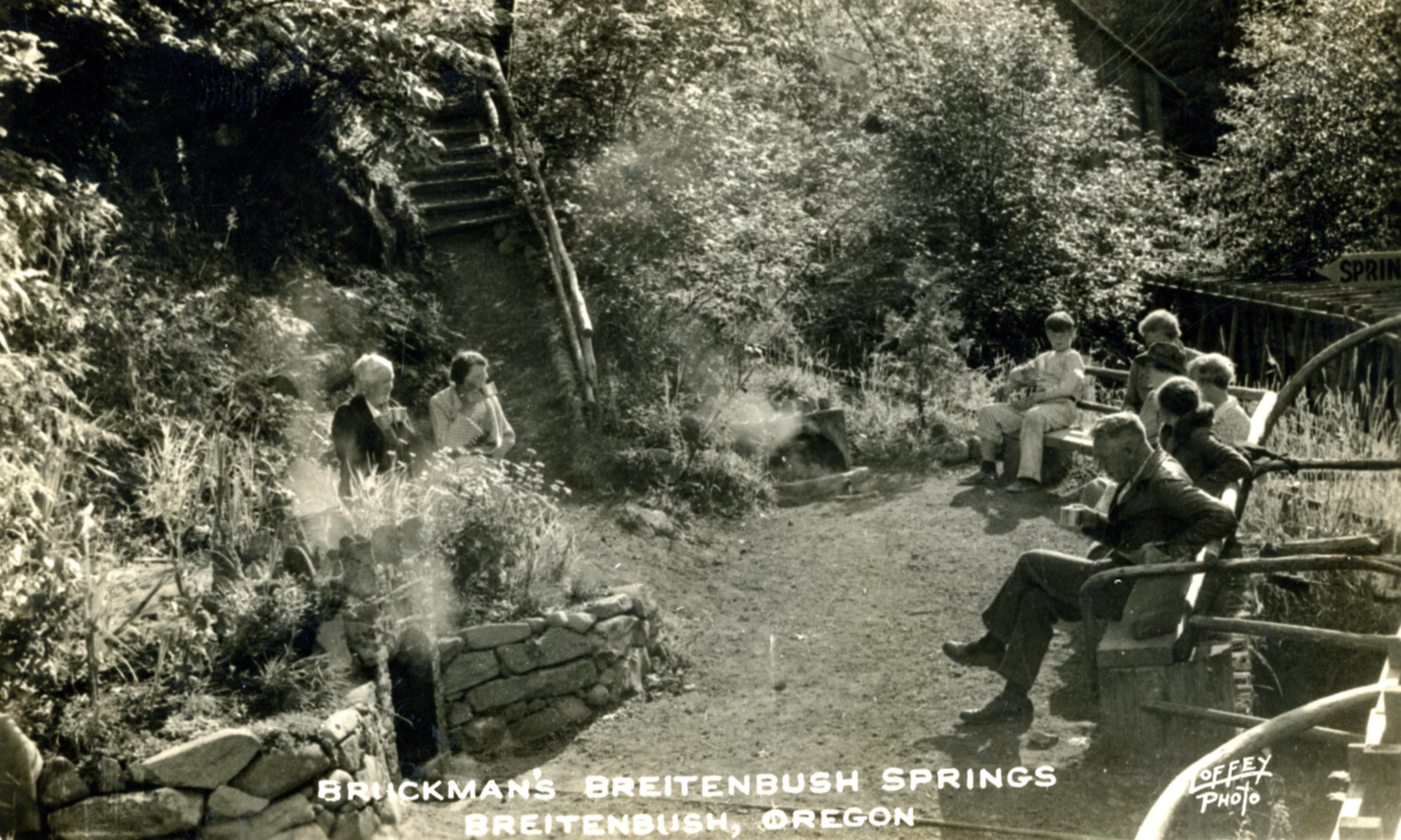
Visitors commonly drank the mineral waters for their perceived health benefits

The Bruckman family—to include Merele's parents, wife, and later, daughters—would manage the property for the entirety of it lease as the Breitenbush Mineral Springs Company through its heyday as a health resort, and were responsible for making large improvements to the facilities. By 1936, the Bruckmans had completed construction on a large hotel (what is now the Breitenbush historic lodge), adding to a long list of projects to precede it, including: a large bathhouse, swimming pool, store, fueling station, dance hall, and many new guest cabins. A Pendleton water turbine was installed in 1927, allowing the wilderness resort to generate its power from the Breitenbush River. In 1938, Merele became postmaster of the Breitenbush post office.

Hattie Ross (Mansfield) became a locally renowned artist and doll-maker during her years living in Portland. She would marry Frederick Bruckman in 1941, bringing her involvement with the springs full-circle.

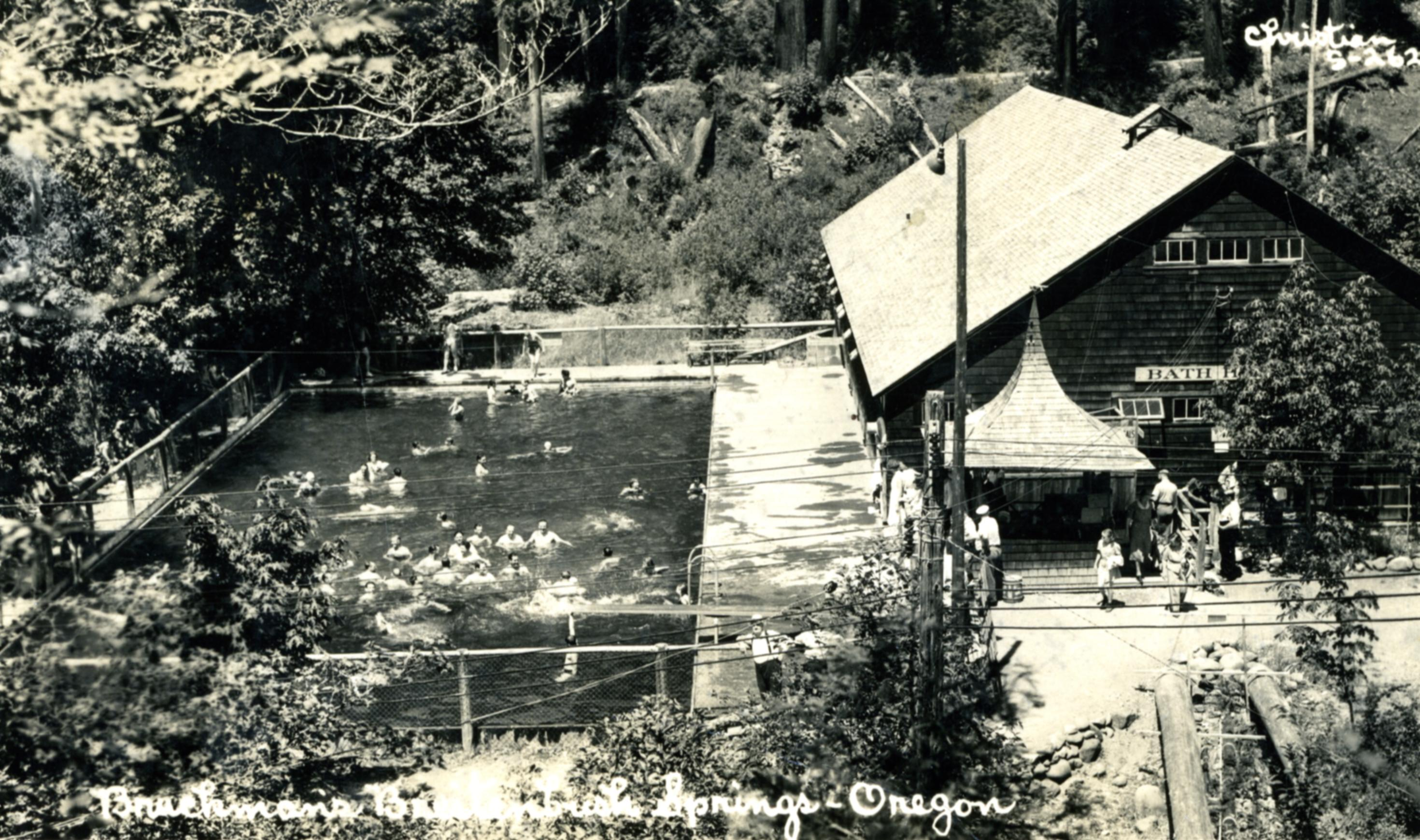
Bruckman era swimming pool

The resort was operated seasonally, as winter weather was challenging. The geothermal heating system in use at the present retreat & conference center had yet to be installed. A particularly hard winter in 1949 crushed several structures under eight feet of snow, and was followed by a fire. Merele Bruckman purchased the resort from the interests of the defunct Breitenbush Hot Springs Company thereafter, but, by the mid-1950s, was looking to sell the property. In history interviews, Bruckman's daughter has cited harsh winters and increasing government regulations as diminishing her father's enthusiasm for running the establishment.
