= Breitenbush Hot Springs (thermal mineral springs) =

Thermal spring system

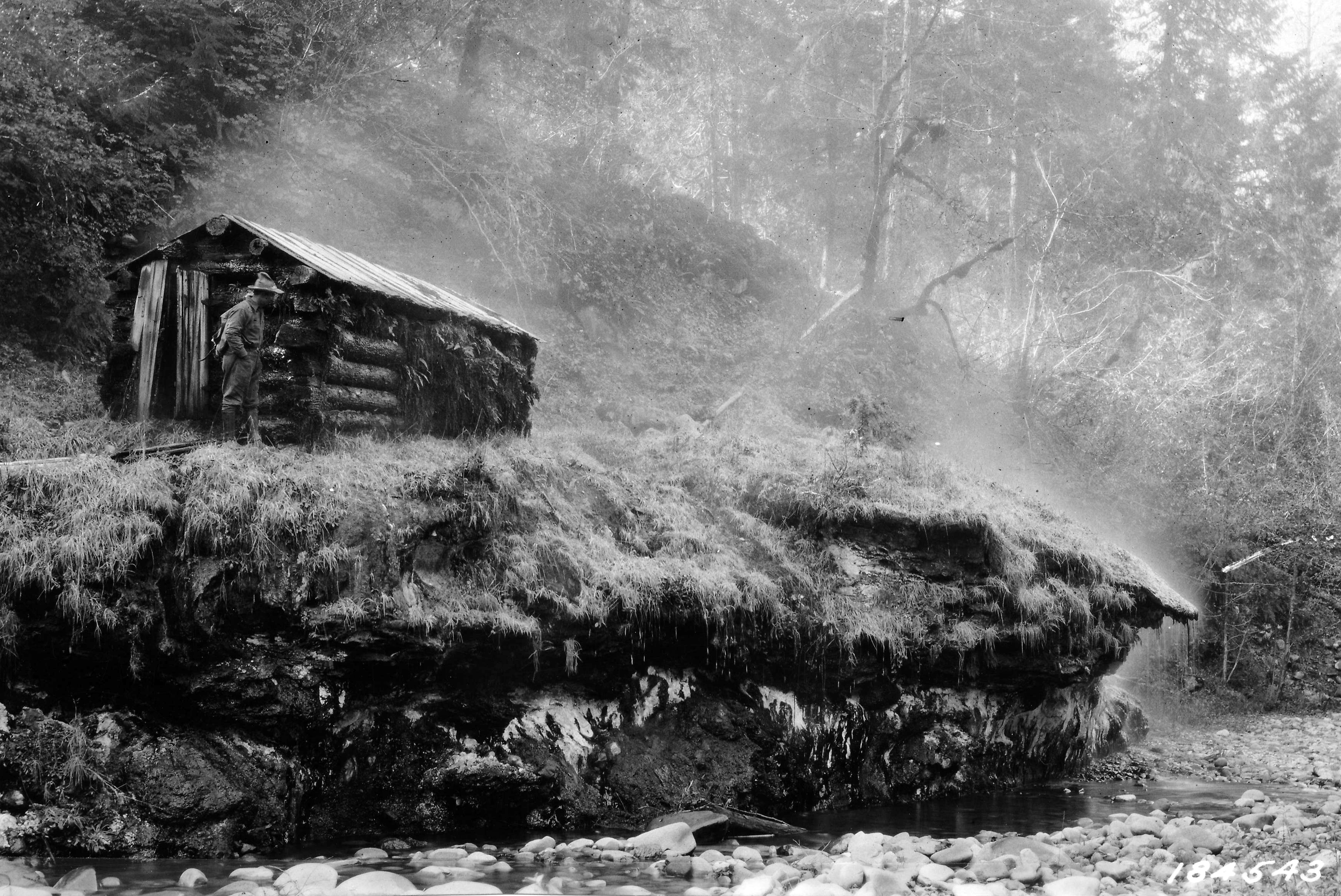
- Breitenbush Hot Springs Sweat House in 1923

- Location within Oregon
- Interactive map of Breitenbush Hot Springs
- Location: near Detroit, Oregon
- Coordinates: 44.783061°N 121.9777805°W
- Elevation: 2,225
- Type: geothermal
- Discharge: (220±20 L/s)
- Temperature: 356 °F (180 °C)

Breitenbush Hot Springs, also known as Breitenbusher Hot Springs, is a thermal mineral spring system along the Breitenbush River near the historic town of Breitenbush, Oregon, United States.

== History ==
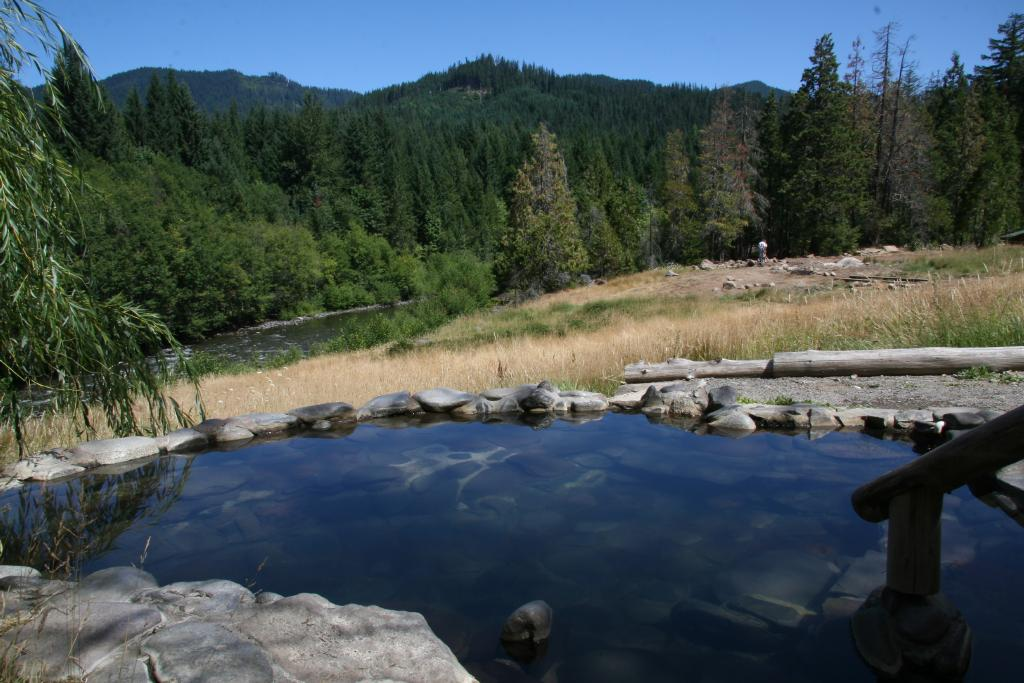
Upper hot spring pool, Breitenbush Hot Springs

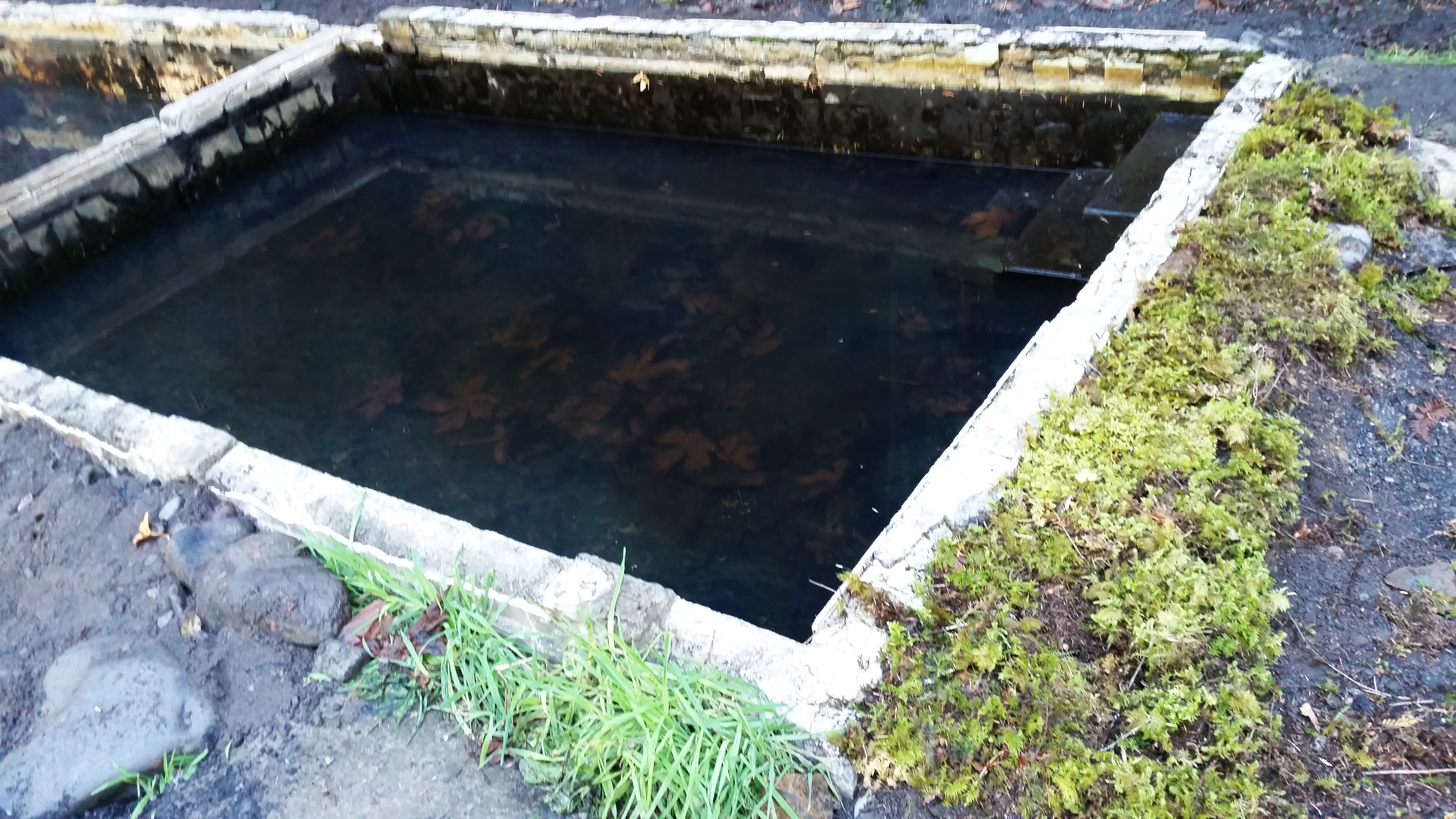
Lower hot springs

The hot springs in this geothermal area were used for centuries by the Indigenous people in the region, the Kalapuya, Wasco, and Molalla, for medicinal and spiritual purposes. Settlers began using the springs in the 1840s.

In 1873, a Willamette Valley farmer John Minto, a Willamette Valley statesman and farmer began developing a transportation route over the Cascade Mountains, wrote in a 1903 memoire, that Henry States, Frank Cooper, and himself had named hot springs after meeting a one-armed hunter named John Breitenbush, who was camping near the hot springs. In 1938, a man named Frederick Breitenbusher claimed that this was his pioneer father, Lewis Breitenbusher. Since 1873, the shortened name Breitenbush rather than Breitenbusher has been used for the springs.

In 1897, John Hollingsworth began managing the hot springs and in 1904 the upper and lower pools became two separate soaking areas. In the same year a grant for the upper hot springs was issued to Claude Mansfield by president Theodore Roosevelt.

In the 1910s, a Salem resident, Mark Skiff, was issued a Forest Service permit to develop the lower hot springs into a commercial establishment, named Skiff's camp. The upper springs were purchased in 1927, by the Bruckman family who further developed the springs to include a large pool and local amenities. In the 1970s the upper and lower facilities were destroyed in a flood. In 1977, the upper springs were purchased by Alex Beamer, and later rebuilt into a retreat and conference center. The lower springs remain in a primitive state with the remains of the soaking pools as well as natural rock pools.

== Water profile ==
The geothermally heated water emerges from over thirty springs at 356 °F (180 °C), and cool to between 198 °F (92 °C) and 150 °F (65 °C) at the surface. The mineral content includes analcime, anhydrite, calcite, calcium, chalcedony, lithium, magnesium, microcline, muscovite, sodium, sulfate, potassium, and quartz.

== Geology ==
The Breitenbush hot springs geothermal area is located on the boundary between the Western Cascade late-Tertiary rocks and the High Cascade rocks which are younger in geological age. The Western Cascade rock formations include the pumice-rich, crystal-vitric Breitenbush Tuff, tuffaceous sandstone, the Detroit Beds, and mudflow breccia. The Breitenbush Tuff is covered by the basaltic lava and breccia of the Outerson Formation. Erosion has occurred in many of the volcanic landforms, but the residuum of the High Cascade volcanoes are still recognizable.

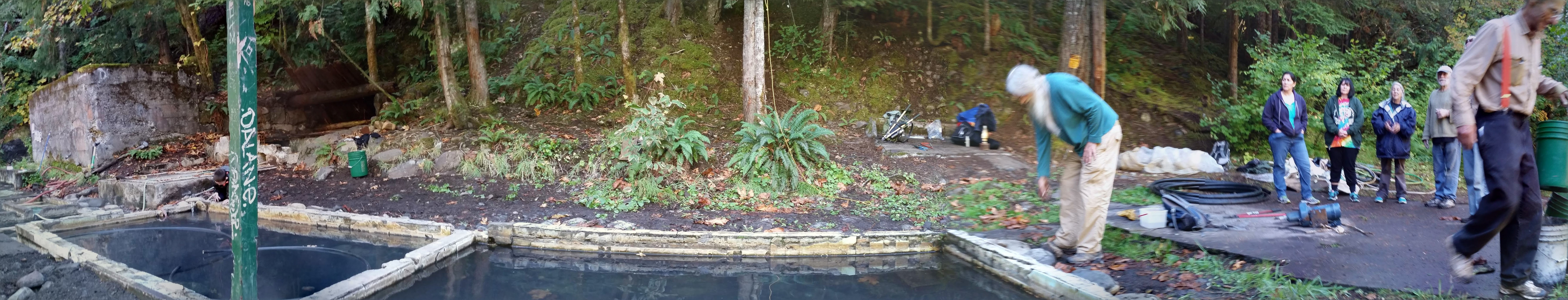
Lower Breitenbush hot springs.

== Location ==
The springs are located in the Willamette National Forest. The Lower Breitenbush hot springs area us are on public land managed by the USDA Forest Service; and are not to be confused with the resort establishment, Breitenbush Hot Springs Retreat & Conference Center, where some of the upper hot springs are located on private property and are accessible only to paying guests of the commercial establishment.

== See also ==
- List of hot springs in the United States
- List of hot springs in the world
