= Willamette National Forest =

United States national forest in Oregon

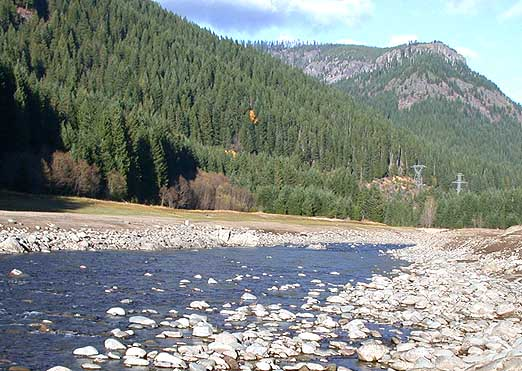
- The Breitenbush River in Willamette National Forest

- Location within the United States
- Location: Oregon, USA
- Nearest city: Eugene, Oregon; Salem, Oregon; Oakridge, Oregon
- Coordinates: 44°6′25.56″N 122°11′4.92″W
- Area: 1,678,031 acres (6,790.75 km^{2})
- Established: July 1, 1933
- Visitors: 1,740,000 (in 2006)
- Governing body: United States Forest Service
- Website: Willamette National Forest

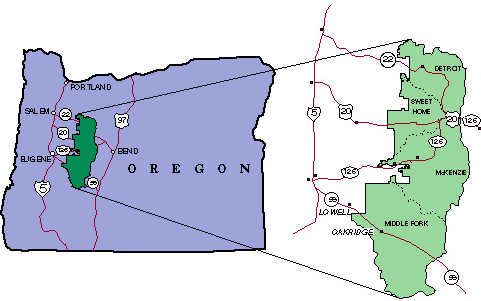
Map of the Willamette National Forest.

The Willamette National Forest is a National Forest located in the central portion of the Cascade Range of the U.S. state of Oregon. It comprises 1,678,031 acres (6,790.75 km^{2}). Over 380,000 acres (694 mi^{2}, 1,540 km^{2}) are designated wilderness which include seven major mountain peaks. There are also several National Wild and Scenic Rivers within the forest. The forest is named for the Willamette River, which has its headwaters in the forest. The forest's headquarters are located in the city of Springfield. There are local ranger district offices in McKenzie Bridge, Detroit, Sweet Home, and Westfir.

The forest stretches for over 100 miles (160 km) along the western slopes of the Cascades in Western Oregon. It extends from the Mount Jefferson area east of Salem to the Calapooya Ridge which divides the watersheds of the Willamette and Umpqua rivers. About 61% of the forest is located in Lane County, but there are large areas in Linn, Marion, and Douglas counties, as well as much smaller areas in Clackamas and Jefferson counties.

== History ==
This section includes edited text from the Willamette National Forest website, which is in the public domain.

The Cascade Forest Reserve was created in September 1893 by proclamation of U.S. President Grover Cleveland, in response to numerous petitions from local citizens requesting protection of the Cascade Range. The Cascade Forest Reserve stretched from the Columbia River almost to the California border. From 1893 to 1897, the Cascade Forest Reserve was largely managed as a preserve.

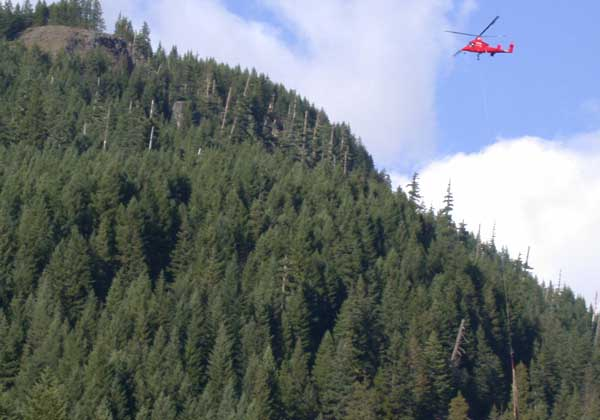
Helicopter carrying timber along the Breitenbush River in the Willamette National Forest

The Sundry Civil Appropriations Act of June 1897 (an organic act) appropriated funds for management of the national forest reserves and mandated management goals. Those management goals included: "…securing favorable conditions of water flows, and to furnish a continuous supply of timber for the use and necessities of the citizens of the United States", protection of the forests from destruction by fire and depredations, and development of mineral resources, among other provisions. The Organic Act led to establishment of forest reserve boundaries, forest supervisors, and forest ranger patrol districts. Addie Morris and Cy Bingham were noteworthy early rangers in areas that would become the Willamette National Forest.

In 1908, the Cascade Forest Reserve was divided into the Oregon National Forest, the Cascade National Forest, the Umpqua National Forest and the Crater National Forest. In 1911, the Santiam National Forest was created from parts of the Oregon National Forest and the Cascade NF. The Deschutes National Forest was created from the portions that drain into the Deschutes River. In 1933, the Santiam National Forest and the Cascade National Forest were combined to form the Willamette National Forest.

The period of 1905 to 1933 featured decentralized administration for the forests of the western Cascades. Forest and district administrative boundaries were further refined. The U.S. Forest Service made efforts to establish relationships with local communities and with the forest users. This was a time of extensive recreation planning in the western Cascades. A fire control organization was built. Mining claims were established, and the first large timber sales were sold near Detroit and Oakridge.

During the Great Depression and World War II, the Willamette National Forest became a representative of the federal government in the communities of the western Cascades. Efforts were made to improve employment and economic conditions through the Civilian Conservation Corps and through the use of sustained yield forestry. During World War II, the Willamette stepped up timber sales to provide resources for the war effort. Between 1942 and 1945, the Willamette sold 559 million board feet (1,320,000 m^{3}) of timber.

The years 1945 to 1970 mark an era of intensive forestry and forest management. This era included dramatic increases in recreation use, timber sales, dam construction, campground construction, and wildlife management. Mining claims were looked at much more critically. Grazing on the national forest was reduced and then virtually discontinued during this era. In 1962, the Columbus Day Storm downed an estimated 140 million board feet (330,000 m^{3}) of timber and created many log jams on the rivers. Two years later, in 1964, the Christmas week flood hit the Willamette hard. Six campgrounds were fully destroyed, and seven more were damaged. Roads, bridges, and culverts were also lost. The passage of the Wilderness Act earlier that year created new wilderness areas and controversy over the management for the new areas. This era also marked the establishment and growth of an activist environmental movement. The movement is best known for the controversy surrounding the French Pete addition to the Three Sisters Wilderness.

The history of the Forest Service and the Willamette National Forest after 1970 is one of dramatic change and heated controversies. The Willamette's timber sales continued at about 750 million board feet (1,800,000 m^{3}) per year through the 1970s; however, the price bid per thousand increased dramatically. This price speculation led to timber sale defaults and sale buy-backs in the early 1980s. The volume not cut in the early 1980s was resold in the latter half of the decade. The "section 318" bill passed by the U.S. Congress increased the volume sold on the Willamette in 1990 to nearly 1 billion board feet (2,400,000 m^{3}) of timber. After that, timber sale volumes declined rapidly. The Willamette National Forest Land Management Plan was approved in 1990. The plan was amended in 1993 by the Northwest Forest Plan (also called the President's Plan). In 1997, the Willamette's planned sale volume was 132 million board feet (310,000 m^{3}).

== Official areas ==
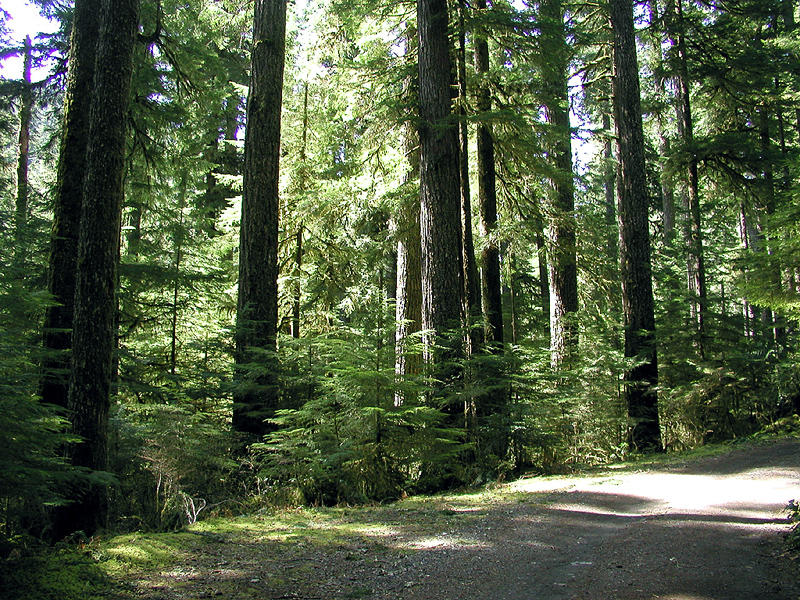
Old-growth forest in the Opal Creek Wilderness

About one fifth, or 380,805 acres (1,541 km^{2}), of the Willamette National Forest is designated as wilderness area, some of which conserve its old-growth forests:

- Diamond Peak Wilderness at 52,337 acres (212 km^{2}) is mostly located within the Deschutes National Forest
- Middle Santiam Wilderness at 8,542 acres (35 km^{2})
- Menagerie Wilderness at 5,033 acres (20 km^{2})
- Mount Jefferson Wilderness at 111,177 acres (450 km^{2}) is partially located within the Mount Hood and Deschutes National Forests
- Mount Washington Wilderness at 52,516 acres (213 km^{2}) is partially located within the Deschutes National Forest
- Opal Creek Wilderness at 20,266 acres (82 km^{2})
- Three Sisters Wilderness at 242,400 acres (981 km^{2}) is partially located within the Deschutes National Forest
- Waldo Lake Wilderness at 37,162 acres (150 km^{2})

== Geography ==
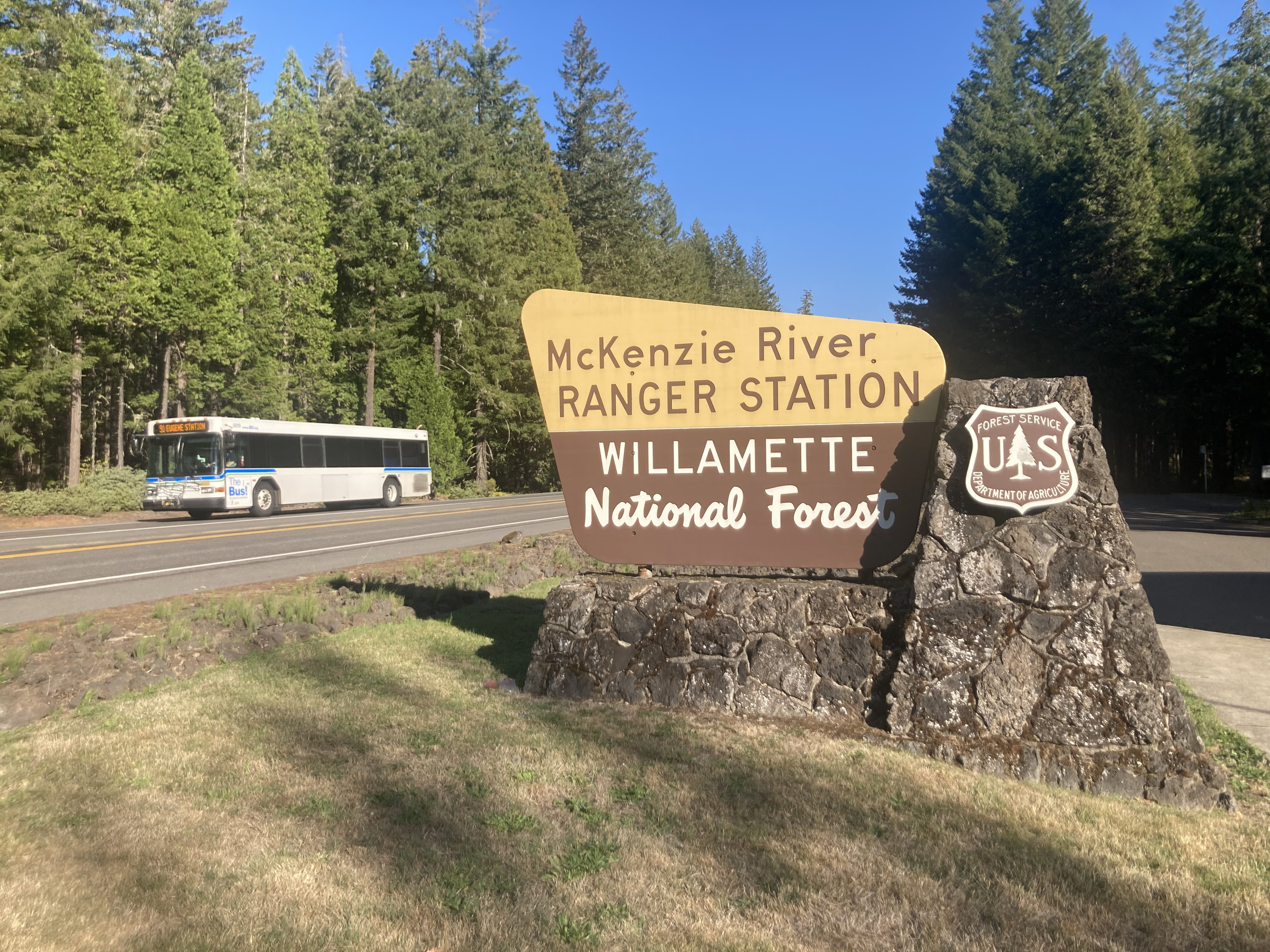
Lane Transit District bus passes the McKenzie River Ranger Station sign

The elevation of the forest ranges from about 1,500 feet (460 meters) above sea level on the western edge of the forest to almost 10,500 ft (3,200 m) at the top of Mount Jefferson, Oregon's second-highest peak. Seven major peaks of the Cascades—Mount Jefferson, Mount Washington, Three Fingered Jack, Diamond Peak, North, Middle and South Sisters—as well as numerous high mountain lakes are within these wilderness areas. The McKenzie and the North Fork Middle Fork Willamette River are part of the National Wild and Scenic Rivers System.

== Ecology ==
The forest receives 80 to 150 inches (2,000 to 3,800 millimeters) of precipitation each year from moist onshore Pacific Ocean flow which encounters adiabatic cooling rising over the Cascades. Much of the precipitation is received in the form of snow which accumulates in higher elevations from October through April. The rain and snow melt drain into the McKenzie, Santiam, and Willamette rivers, which flow from the forest and provide high-quality drinking water to Eugene, Salem, Corvallis, and Albany. There are over 1,500 miles (2,400 kilometers) of rivers and streams in the forest and over 375 lakes.

The forest's dominant tree species is the Douglas-fir, the state tree of Oregon. Douglas-fir is a valuable timber species in the United States. The forest contains some stands of old-growth forest, some of which are over 300 feet (91 m) tall, among the tallest trees in the world, with tree diameters ranging from 3 to 8 feet (0.91 to 2.44 m). A 1993 Forest Service study estimated that the extent of old growth in the forest was 594,800 acres (240,700 ha).

Over one dozen other conifer species are common in the forest, including western redcedar, incense-cedar, western white pine, ponderosa pine, Pacific yew, western hemlock, mountain hemlock, and several species of fir. The forest is home to over 300 species of fish and wildlife, including the northern spotted owl, mule deer, bald eagle, Chinook salmon, black-tailed deer, bull trout, black bear, cougar, southern red-backed vole, elk, wolverine, and several other sensitive and threatened species.

== Conservation ==
The forest is central to the famous controversy between the logging industry and the endangered species status of the northern spotted owl. Environmentalists maintain that the forest was aggressively clearcut for many years threatening a federally listed endangered species. The timber industry contended that the forest can simultaneously provide lumber jobs and wildlife habitat. Since April 1994, the forest has been governed by the Northwest Forest Plan, which restricts, but does not eliminate, logging in potential spotted owl habitat.

== Gallery ==
Douglas Maple (Acer glabrum)

Douglas Maple (Acer glabrum)

Douglas Maple (Acer glabrum)

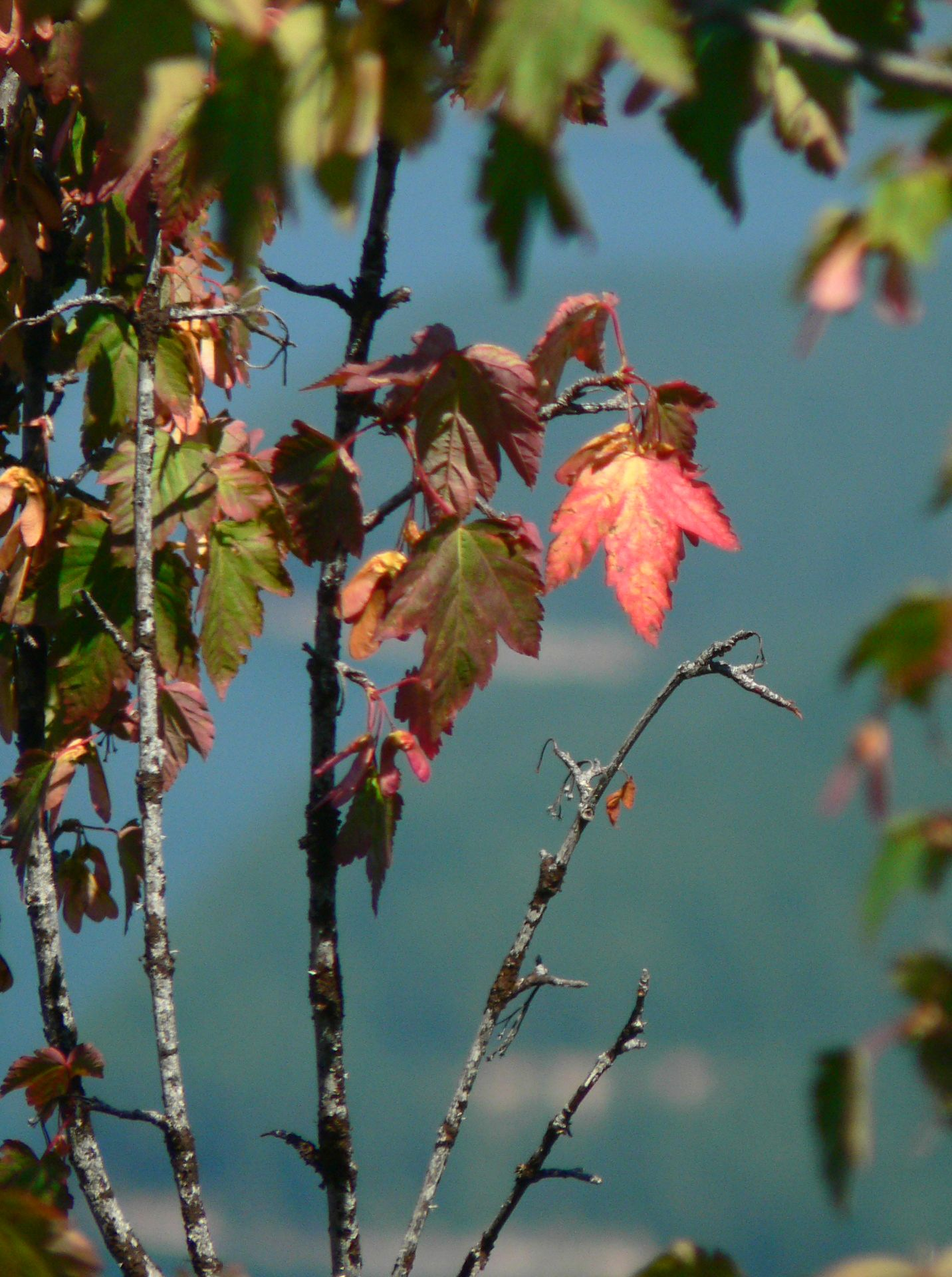
Douglas Maple (Acer glabrum)

Douglas Maple (Acer glabrum)

Douglas Maple (Acer glabrum)

Detroit Lake (North Santiam River reservoir)

California tortoiseshell (Nymphalis californica)

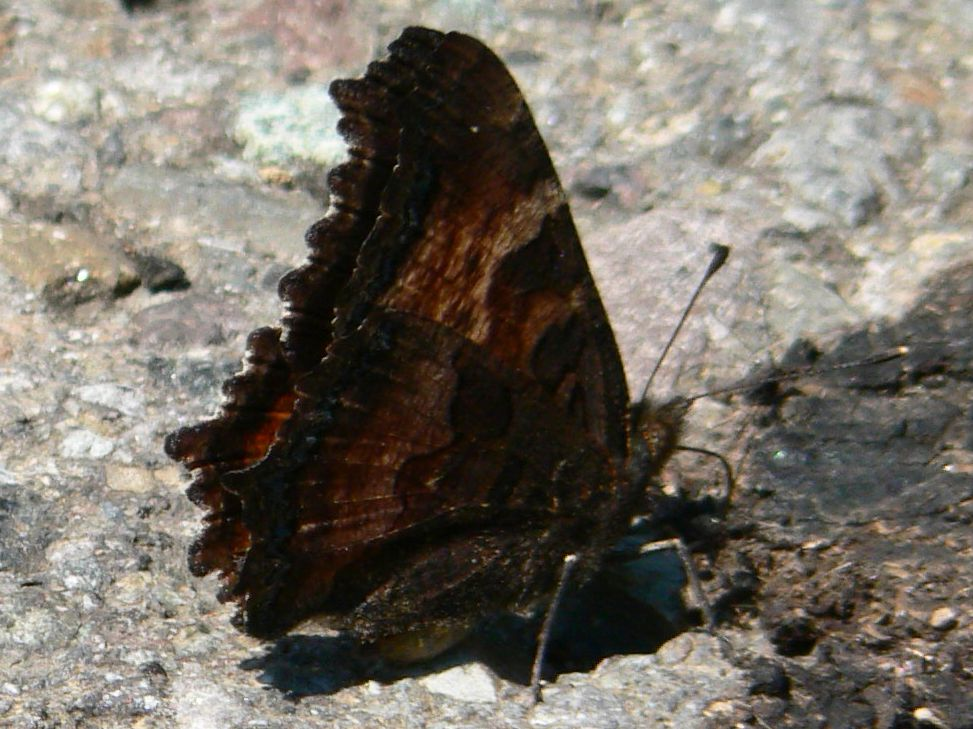
California tortoiseshell (Nymphalis californica)

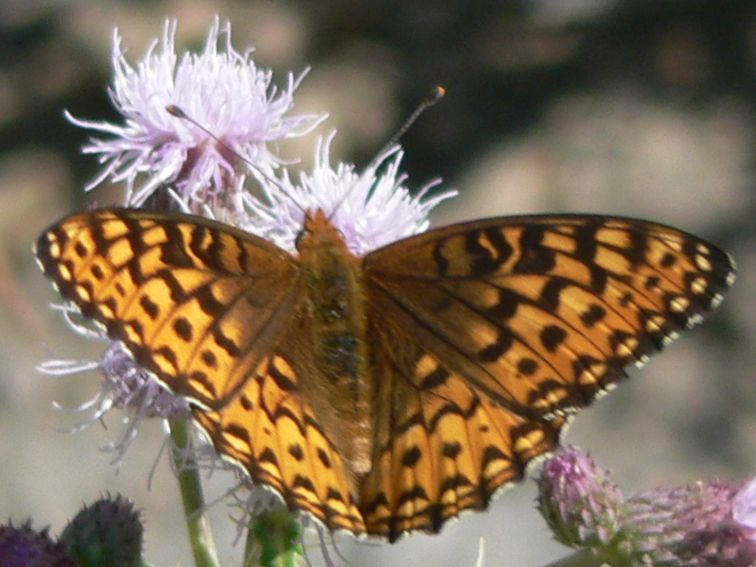
Hydaspe Fritillary (Speyeria hydaspe)

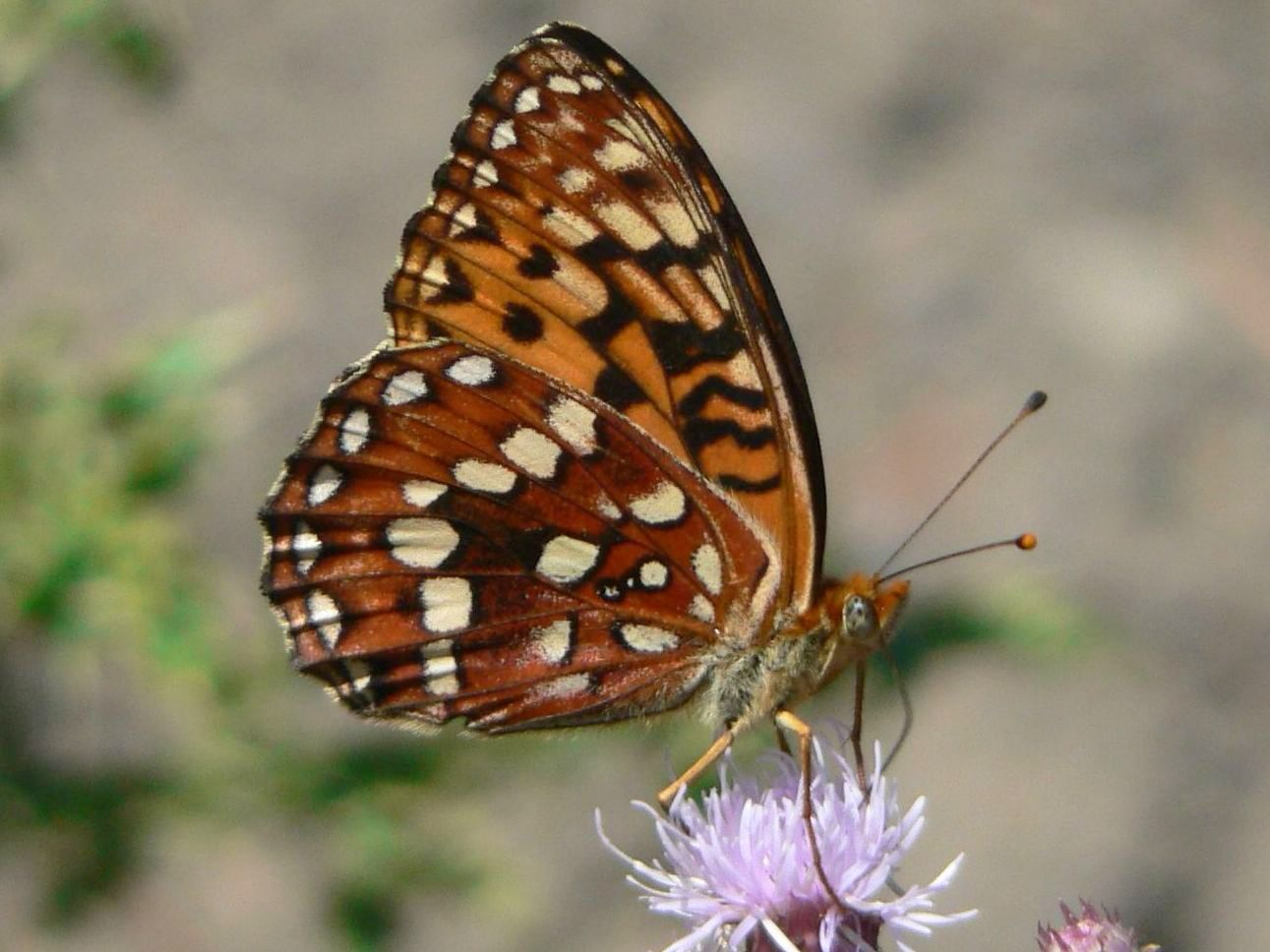
Hydaspe Fritillary (Speyeria hydaspe)

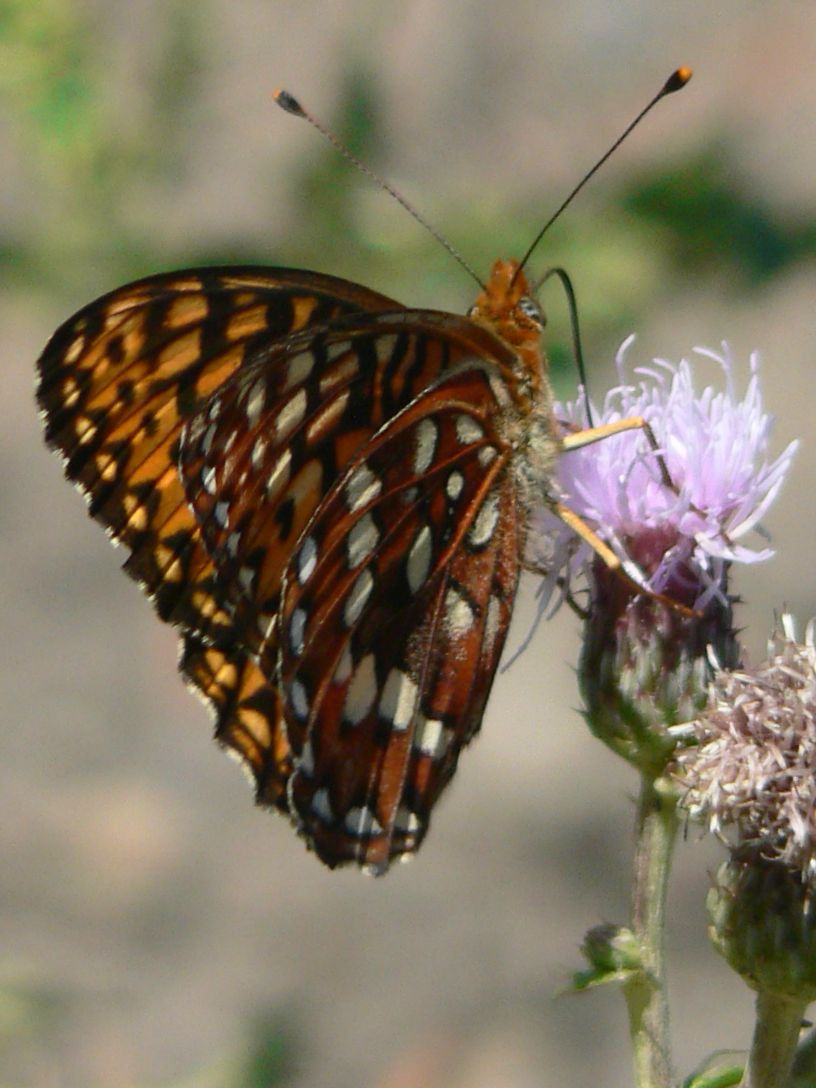
Hydaspe Fritillary (Speyeria hydaspe)

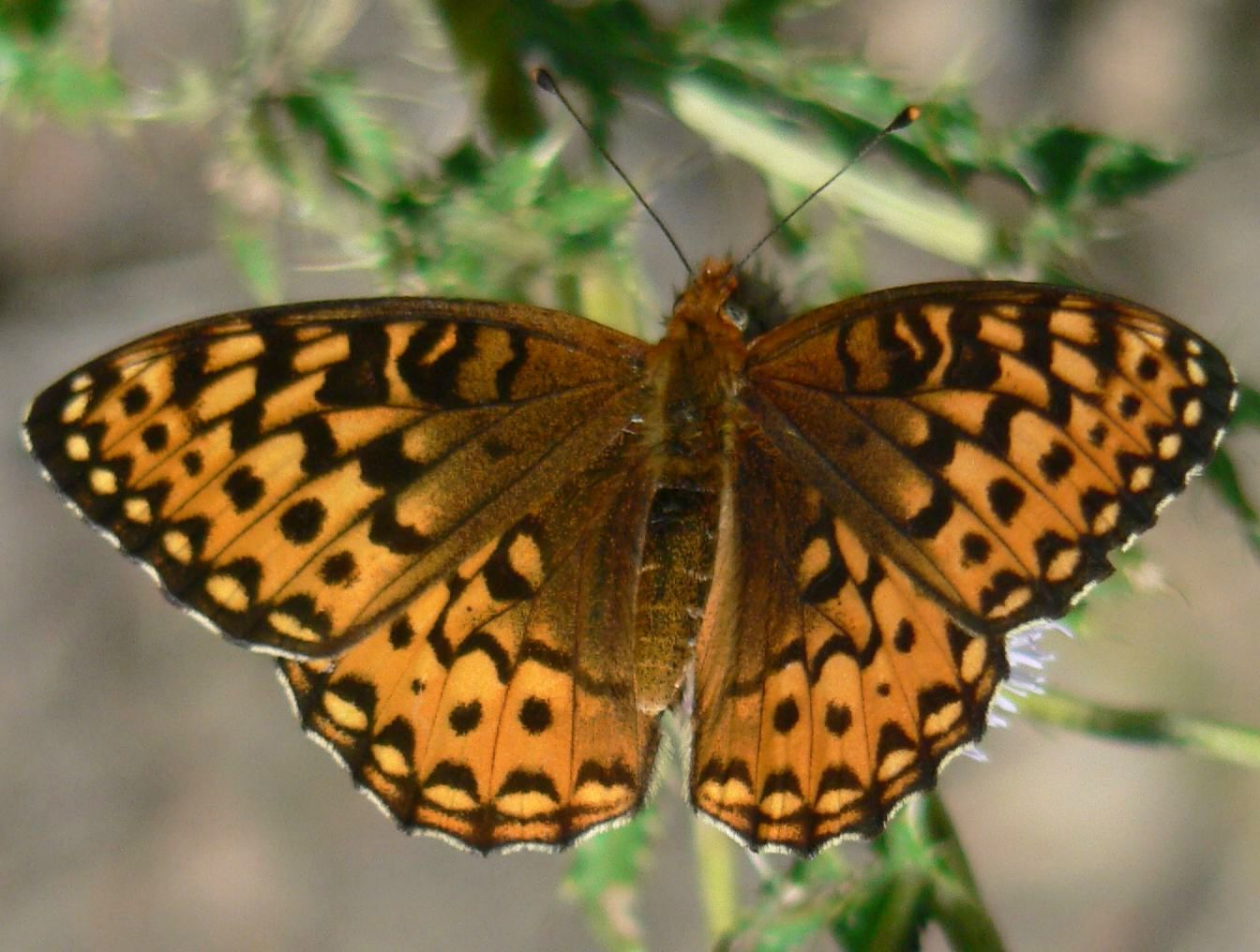
Hydaspe Fritillary (Speyeria hydaspe)

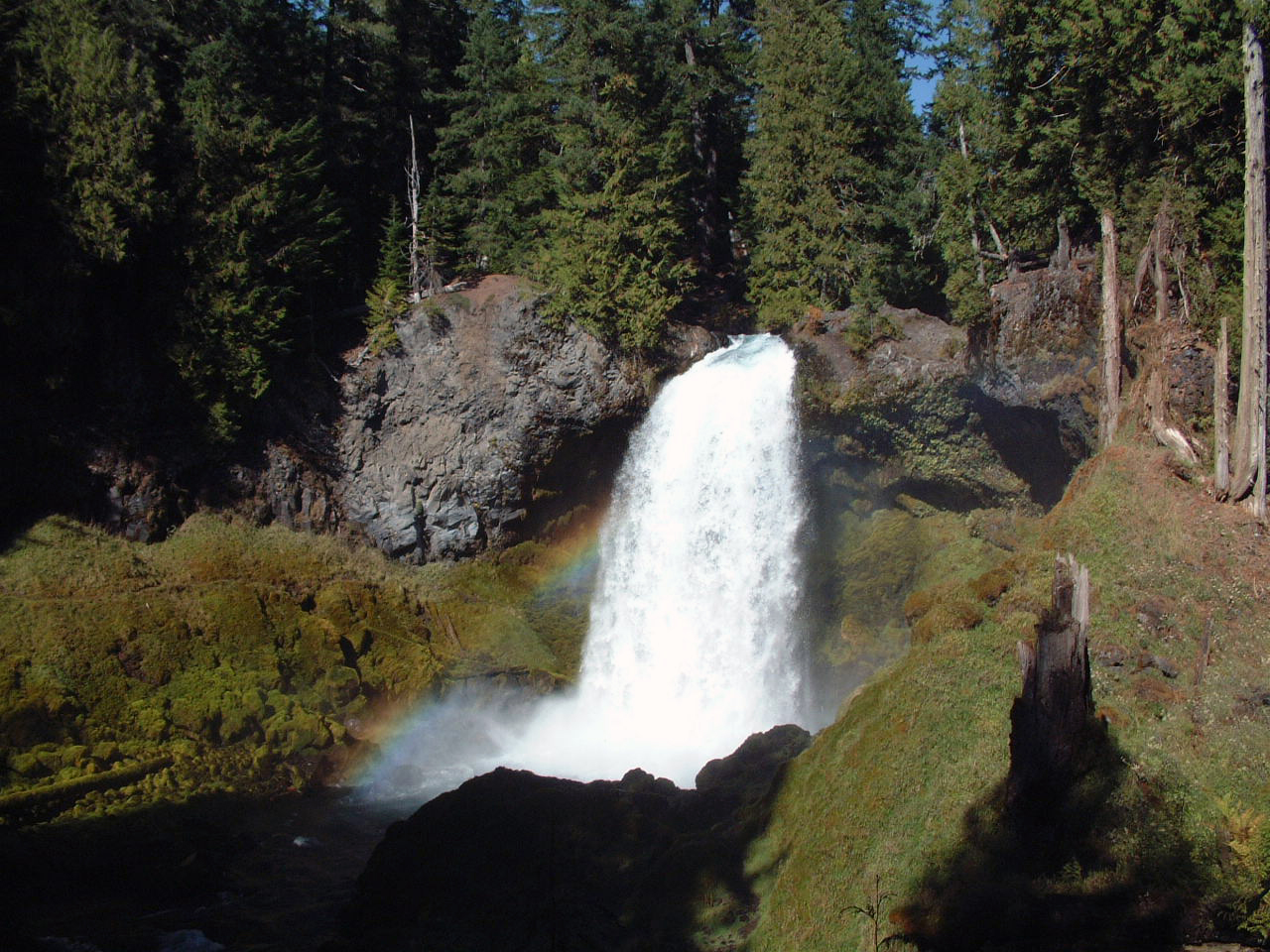
Sahalie Falls on the McKenzie River

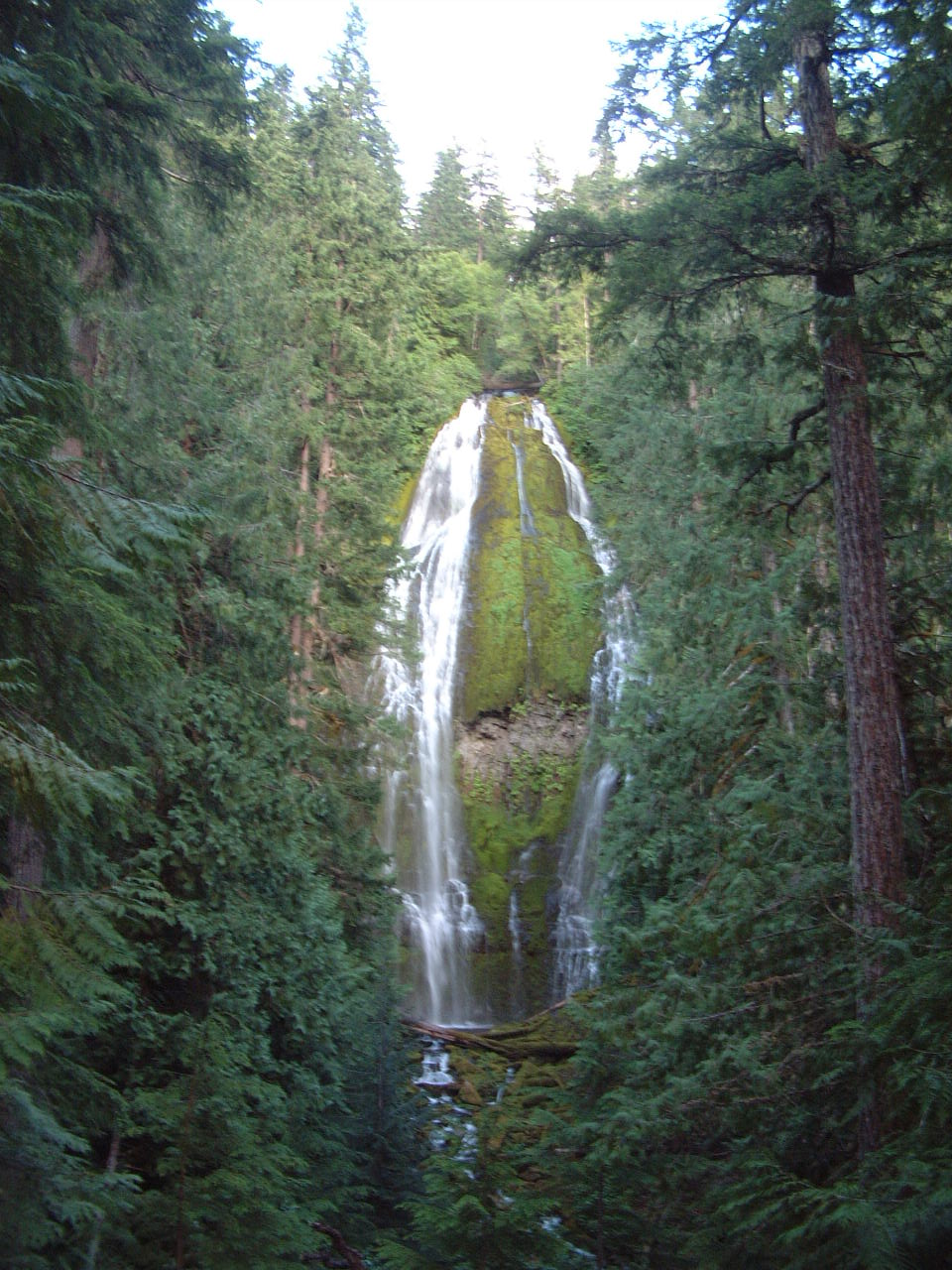
Proxy Falls in the Three Sisters Wilderness Area

== See also ==
- List of national forests of the United States
- Camp Pioneer
- Sahalie Falls
- Koosah Falls
- Clear Lake (Linn County, Oregon)
