= Nimrod, Oregon =

Unincorporated community in the state of Oregon, United States

- Unincorporated community
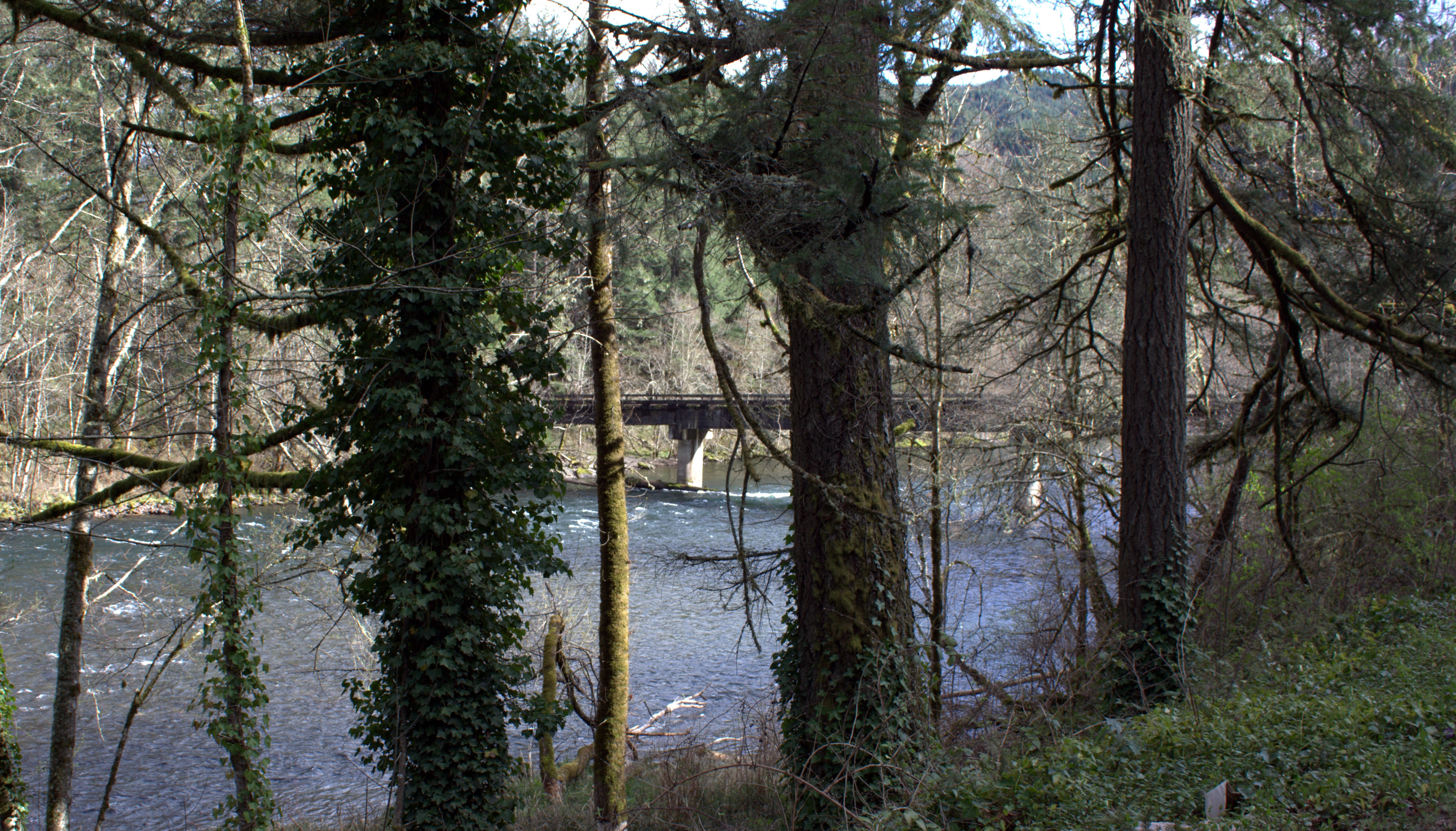
- Closed bridge in Nimrod

- Location within Oregon Location within the United States
- Coordinates: 44°06′49″N 122°25′25″W
- Country: United States
- State: Oregon
- County: Lane
- Elevation: 1,171 ft (357 m)
- Time zone: UTC-8 (Pacific (PST))
  - Summer (DST): UTC-7 (PDT)
- ZIP code: 97488
- Area codes: 458 and 541
- GNIS feature ID: 1124687

Nimrod is an unincorporated community in Lane County, Oregon, United States, on the McKenzie River. It is located along Oregon Route 126, between Vida and Blue River, 35 miles (56 km) east of Eugene, in the Willamette National Forest. As of 2003, its population was roughly 190. Nimrod is the site of a former ferry that crossed the McKenzie. Nimrod is served by the Vida post office, ZIP Code 97488.

== History and name ==
The earliest reference to Nimrod in the locality was the Nimrod Inn, opened in the early 1900s by Alfred Parkhurst. Some historians think that the inn was named for the biblical character Nimrod, whose name was synonymous with "mighty hunter", in recognition of the excellent fishing on the McKenzie River. The community also may have been named after a fishing lure, to recognize the prowess of a local hunter or fisherman, or for one of Oregon's earliest settlers, Nimrod O'Kelly, who arrived in Oregon 1845. Nimrod is one of the few locations in Oregon not listed in Oregon Geographic Names, because a source for the name's origin has not been verified.

Because of the community's unusual name, now generally associated with the derogatory usage "fool" or "idiot", (perhaps due to Bugs Bunny using the term to refer to Elmer Fudd, when, in fact, he just meant "hunter", as associated with the biblical Nimrod), the main sign marking the location is a popular spot for photos, and is bolted to discourage theft.
