= Goodpasture Bridge =

Covered bridge in Oregon, US

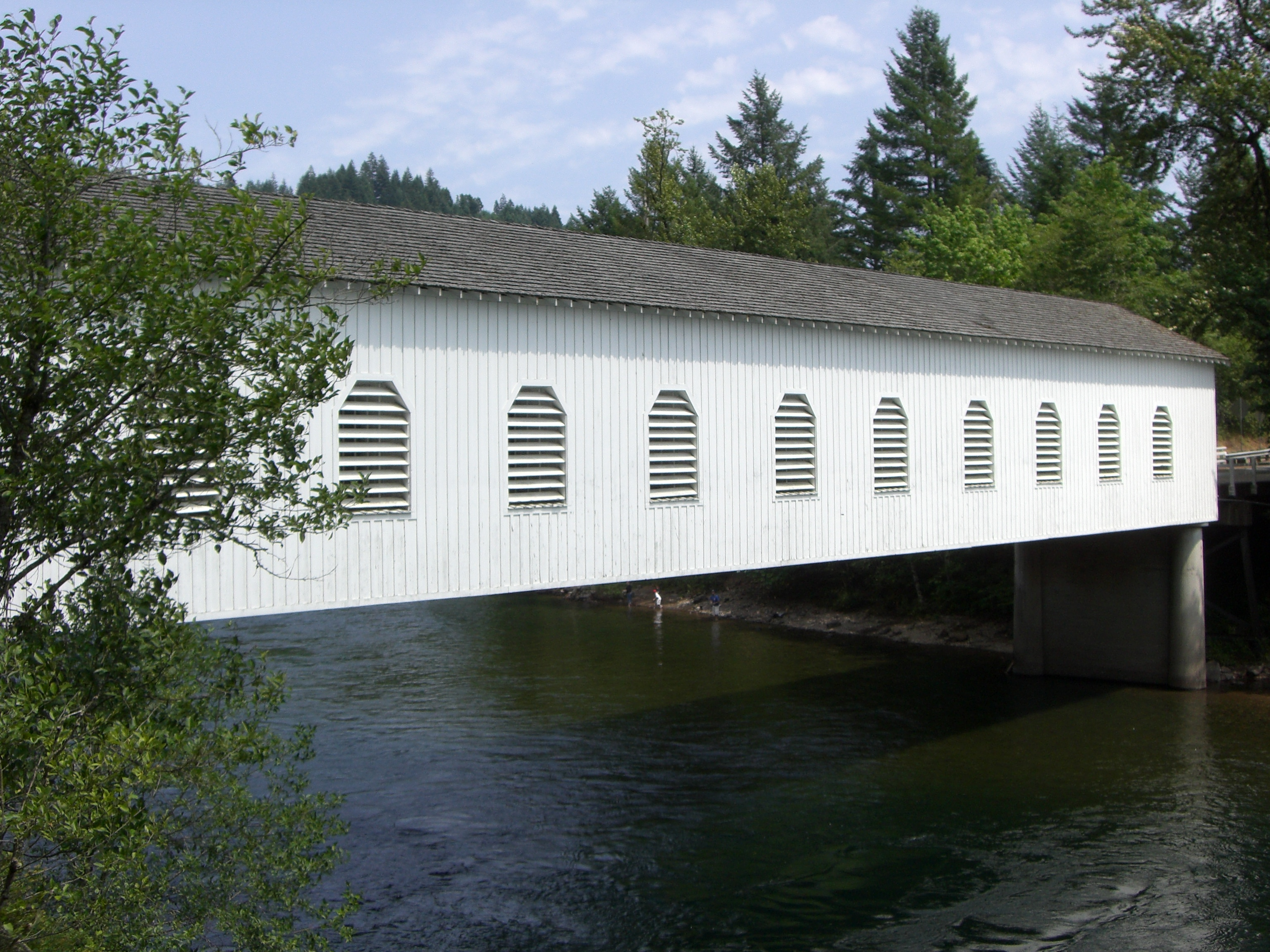
- Coordinates: 44°8′53″N 122°35′15″W
- Carries: Goodpasture Road
- Crosses: McKenzie River
- Locale: Lane County, Oregon, United States
- Maintained by: Lane County Public Works Department
- Load: 44 short tons (40 t)

Characteristics
- Design: U.S. National Register of Historic Places
- Total length: 237 ft (72 m)
- Width: 17.7 ft (5.4 m)
- Height: 13.3 ft (4.1 m)

History
- Constructed by: Oregon State Highway Department
- Built: 1938
- Goodpasture Bridge
- U.S. National Register of Historic Places
- MPS: Oregon Covered Bridges
- NRHP reference No.: 79002100
- Added to NRHP: November 29, 1979

Location
- Interactive map of Goodpasture Bridge

The Goodpasture Bridge spans the McKenzie River near the community of Vida in Lane County, Oregon, United States. It is the second longest covered bridge and one of the most photographed covered bridges in the state. The Goodpasture Bridge is listed on the National Register of Historic Places.

== History ==
Lane County was the first Oregon county to build covered bridges on a large scale. Today, the county has more surviving covered bridges than any other county west of the Mississippi River, with a total of 17 bridges, including 14 that are still open to traffic. The county's engineering division maintains the covered bridges that are open to traffic, including the Goodpasture Bridge.

The Goodpasture Bridge was built in 1938, and cost $13,154 to construct. It was named for Benjamin Franklin Goodpasture, a pioneer farmer who had settled near the bridge site. The bridge crosses the McKenzie River two miles west of the community of Vida. At 165 feet (50 m) long, it the second longest covered bridge in Oregon. Because of its unique scenic beauty and its importance to Oregon's transportation history, the Goodpasture Bridge was listed on the National Register of Historic Places in 1979.

Over time, bridge traffic significantly weakened the structure. In 1987, Lane County officials decided to restore the original covered bridge instead of bypassing it with a modern concrete span. The county spent $750,000 to renovate the bridge structure, road surface, and approaches. The project also added a right-turn lane for traffic exiting Oregon Route 126 onto the bridge, and built a concrete retaining wall along the north bank of the McKenzie River to stabilize the area. Today, the Goodpasture Bridge handles a normal load of traffic including logging trucks.

In 2005, the Lane County Public Works Department began issuing a series of 17 commemorative coins to honor the county's covered bridges. Income from coin sales is used to help maintain the historic bridges. The first coin, struck in the fall of 2005, honored the Goodpasture Bridge. The remaining sixteen coins are being released at a rate of two per year through 2013.

In 2010, Lane County reported receiving $2 million in a federal transportation grant to repair the bridge and raise its derated load limit from 15 short tons (14 t) back to 40 short tons (36 t) beginning in 2012.

It was rumored that the bridge was destroyed in the Holiday Farm wildfire on September 8, 2020, but this was later confirmed to be false.

== Structure ==
The Goodpasture Bridge was designed by the Oregon State Highway Department (now the Oregon Department of Transportation) and was built by Lane County. A.C. Striker was the county bridge superintendent at the time of its construction. It was built to allow local families and commercial logging trucks to cross the McKenzie River.

The Goodpasture Bridge is a classic covered bridge in design. The deck is 17.7 feet (5.4 m) wide with a vertical clearance of 15.3 feet (4.7 m). The bridge's two foundation tiers were concrete. Its wooden floor planks and shingled roof were intact, as is the weatherboard housing that protects the Howe truss infrastructure from the weather.

Most of Oregon's covered bridges, including the Goodpasture Bridge, were built using the Howe truss system, developed in 1840 by the Massachusetts architect William Howe. The system uses heavy timbers reinforced with iron or steel rods. The trusses have central beams and crossed timbers with adjustable, vertical iron rods to support the structural load.

The Goodpasture Bridge is one of the most photographed bridges in the state of Oregon. The bridge's architectural detailing includes false end beams, semi-elliptical portals, and ten Gothic style louvered windows on each side. The windows were built to allow light into the long covered structure so drivers could see oncoming traffic. During the Christmas season, the bridge is hung with decorations, attracting many winter visitors.

== See also ==
- List of bridges documented by the Historic American Engineering Record in Oregon
- List of bridges on the National Register of Historic Places in Oregon
- List of Oregon covered bridges
