= Clear Lake (Linn County, Oregon) =

Lake in Linn County, Oregon, U.S.

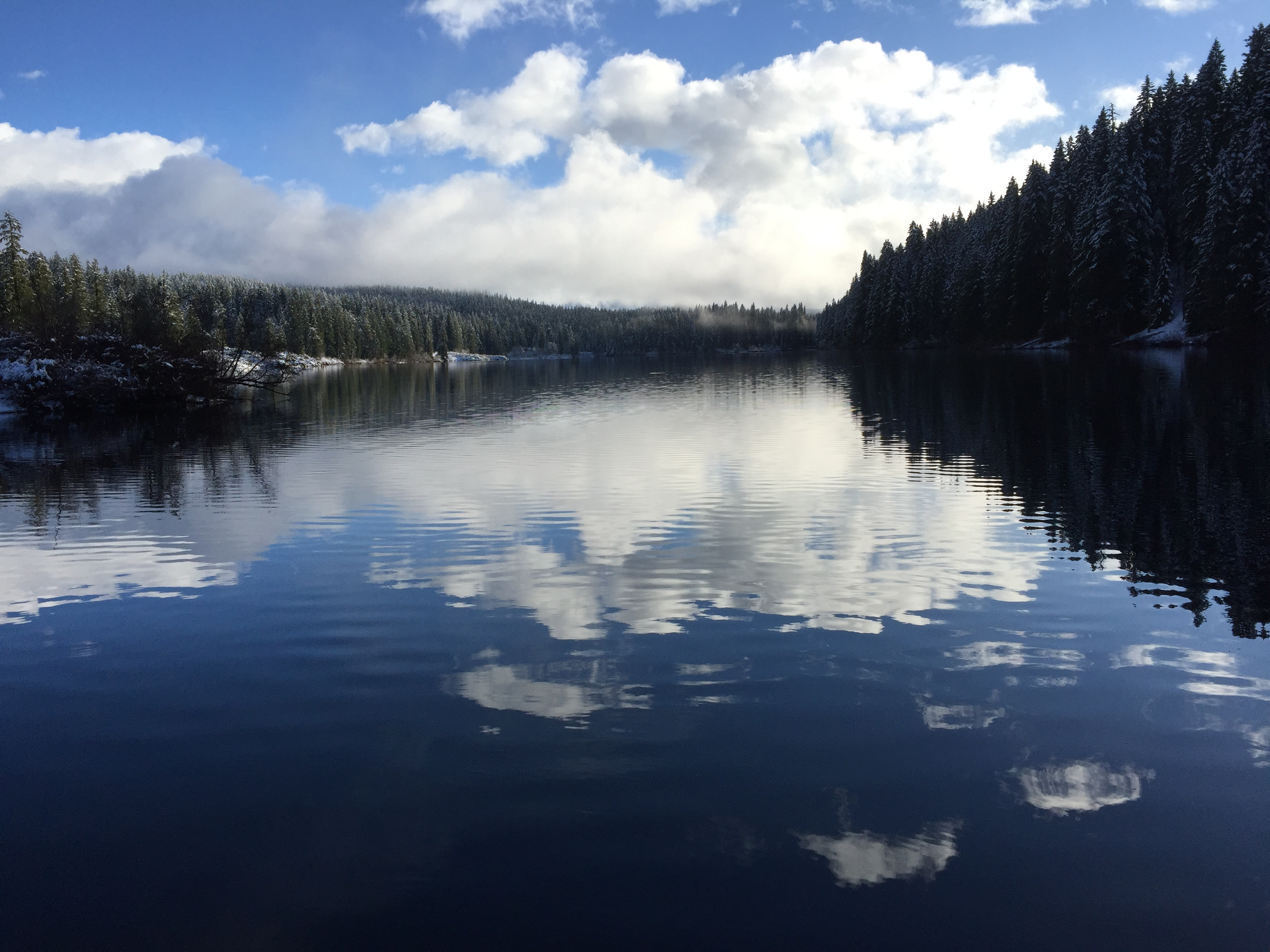
- Clear Lake, Linn County, Oregon

- Location of Clear Lake in Oregon, USA. Clear Lake (the United States)
- Location: Linn County, Oregon, United States
- Coordinates: 44°21′38″N 121°59′33″W
- Type: natural lake
- Primary outflows: McKenzie River
- Basin countries: United States
- Surface area: 148 acres (0.60 km^{2})
- Average depth: 50 ft (15 m)
- Max. depth: 175 ft (53 m)
- Water volume: 11,800 acre⋅ft (0.0146 km^{3})
- Residence time: 0.5 mo
- Shore length^{1}: 3.2 mi (5.1 km)
- Surface elevation: 3,012 ft (918 m)
- ^{1} Shore length is not a well-defined measure.

Clear Lake is a mountain lake 86 mi (138 km) northeast of Eugene, Oregon, United States in Linn County. It has two main bodies connected by a bottleneck. The lake is primarily fed by snow runoff from nearby Mount Washington and the surrounding areas. The runoff filters through caverns for more than 20 years before emptying into Clear Lake. The lake is also fed by two small creeks, which may dry up seasonally, along with Great Spring, the source of the McKenzie River.

Clear Lake is the headwaters of the McKenzie River, which is the sole source of drinking water for Eugene. The south end of Clear Lake empties 250,000 gallons per minute (57 million Liters/hour) into the White Water Rapids which then flows over Sahalie Falls and Koosah Falls 1 mile downstream on the opposite side of Highway 126.

== Diving ==
Clear Lake is reported to be one of the most exceptional freshwater dive spots in Oregon. Submerged 100 feet (30 m) deep in the lake is a stand of upright trees that were killed approximately 3,000 years ago when volcanic activity created the lake. The trees are remarkably preserved due to the cold year-round water temperatures of between 35–43 °F (2–6 °C).

== Hiking ==
Clear Lake is circled by Clear Lake Loop Trail, a hike loop made up of Clear Lake Trail and McKenzie River Trail that is 5 miles (8.0 km) long. An accompanying trail guide prepared by Willamette National Forest tells visitors about Clear Lake and the neighboring lava field and forest.

== See also ==
- List of lakes in Oregon
