= Cascade National Forest =

National Forest in Oregon, United States

Coordinates: 43.5689°N 122.3097°W

Cascade National Forest was established by the U.S. Forest Service in Oregon on March 2, 1907, with 5,886,840 acres (23,823.2 km^{2}) when its name was shortened from Cascade Range National Forest and land was added. The Cascade Range Forest Reserve was established by the United States General Land Office in Oregon on September 28, 1893, with 4,492,800 acres (18,182 km^{2}). On July 1, 1933, the entire forest was combined with Santiam National Forest to establish Willamette National Forest.
