= Santiam National Forest =

Protected area in Oregon, United States

Coordinates: 44.6049°N 122.5342°W

The Santiam National Forest was established by the U.S. Forest Service in Oregon on July 1, 1911 with 710,170 acres (2,874.0 km^{2}) from portions of Cascade National Forest and Oregon National Forest. On July 1, 1933 the entire forest was combined with Cascade to establish Willamette National Forest.
