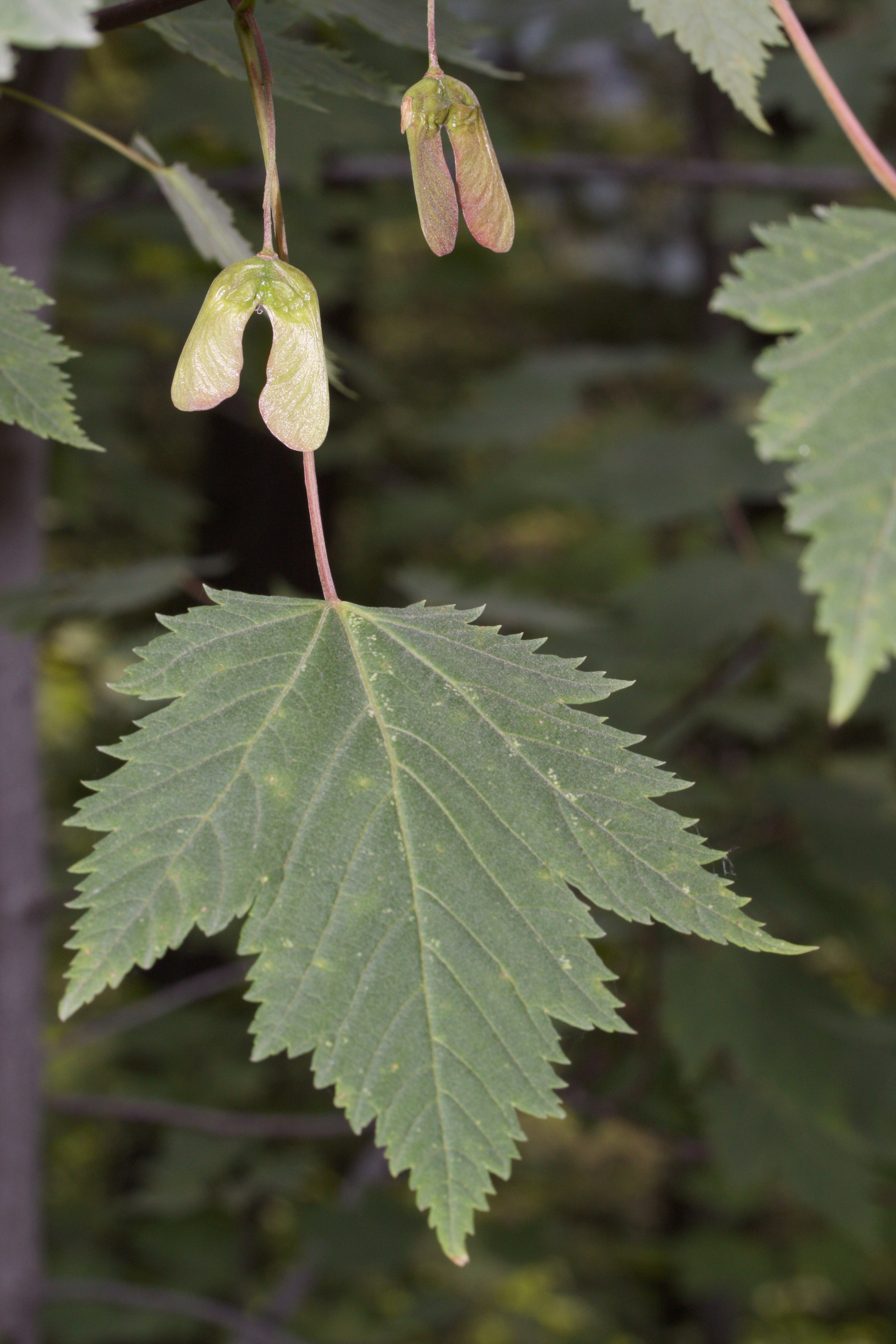
- A. glabrum subsp. douglasii, Olympic National Forest

Conservation status
- Least Concern (IUCN 3.1)

- Secure (NatureServe)

Scientific classification
- Kingdom: Plantae
- Clade: Tracheophytes
- Clade: Angiosperms
- Clade: Eudicots
- Clade: Rosids
- Order: Sapindales
- Family: Sapindaceae
- Genus: Acer
- Section: Acer sect. Glabra
- Species: A. glabrum

Binomial name
- Acer glabrum Torr. 1827
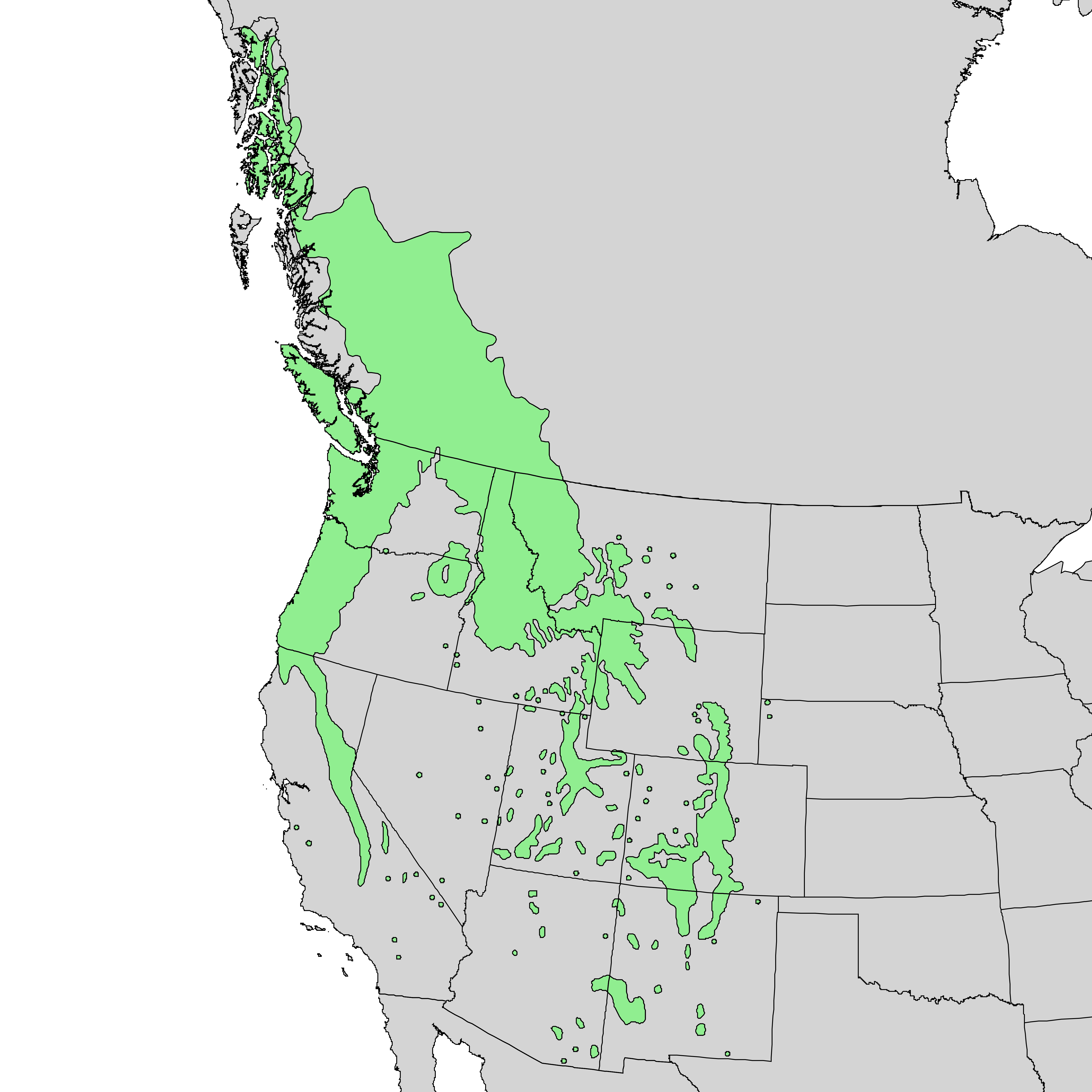
- Natural range

Synonyms
- List: Acer barbatum Hook. 1831 not Michx. 1803; Acer neomexicanum Greene; Acer torreyi Greene; Acer tripartitum Nutt.

= Acer glabrum =

Species of maple

Acer glabrum is a species of maple native to western North America, from southeastern Alaska, British Columbia and western Alberta, east to western Nebraska, and south through Washington, Oregon, Idaho, Montana and Colorado to California, Arizona, Utah, and New Mexico.

== Description ==
Acer glabrum is a small tree growing to 6–9 metres (20–30 feet) tall, exceptionally 12 m (39 ft), with a trunk around 13 centimetres (5 inches) in diameter, exceptionally around 25 cm (10 in). The leaves are 2–13 cm (3/4–5 in) broad, three-lobed (rarely five-lobed), variable in the depth of lobing, occasionally so deeply lobed as to be divided into three leaflets; the lobes have an acute apex and a coarsely serrated margin. The flowers are produced in corymbs of five to ten, yellowish-green, at the same time as the new leaves in spring. The fruit is a samara or winged seed, which develops in fused pairs at an angle of less than 45° when mature, though some varieties spread out to 90°.

=== Varieties ===
There are four to six varieties, some of them treated by some authors at the higher rank of subspecies:

- Acer glabrum var. glabrum (syn. subsp. glabrum; Rocky Mountain maple)– Rocky Mountains, Montana to New Mexico
- Acer glabrum var. diffusum (Greene) Smiley (syn. subsp. diffusum (Greene) A.E.Murray; Rocky Mountain maple) – eastern California, Nevada, Utah
- Acer glabrum var. douglasii (Hook.) Dippel (syn. subsp. douglasii (Hook.) Wesm.; Douglas maple, also incorrectly vine maple) – Alaska south to Washington and Idaho
- Acer glabrum var. greenei Keller (Greene's maple) – endemic-central California
- Acer glabrum var. neomexicanum (Greene) Kearney & Peebles (syn. subsp. neomexicanum (Greene) A.E.Murray; New Mexico maple) – New Mexico
- Acer glabrum var. torreyi (Greene) Smiley (syn. subsp. torreyi (Greene) A.E.Murray; Torrey maple) – endemic-Northern California

== Distribution and habitat ==
Acer glabrum is plentiful in many parts of the Rocky Mountains, Cascade Mountains, Olympic Mountains and the Sierra Nevada, often growing with ponderosa pine, Douglas-fir, and quaking aspen. It can be found in dry rocky areas.

== Ecology ==
It tends to be found in brush fields arising from fire-disturbed sites. Conifers tend to replace it in well-forested areas. The foliage is browsed by game animals (especially deer and elk in winter), cattle, and sheep.

== Uses ==
Native Americans utilized the strong stems for snowshoe frames, bows, and other applications. Some Plateau Indian tribes drink an infusion of Douglas maple as a treatment for diarrhea. Ramah Navajo use an infusion of the glabrum variety for swellings, and also as a "life medicine", or panacea.
