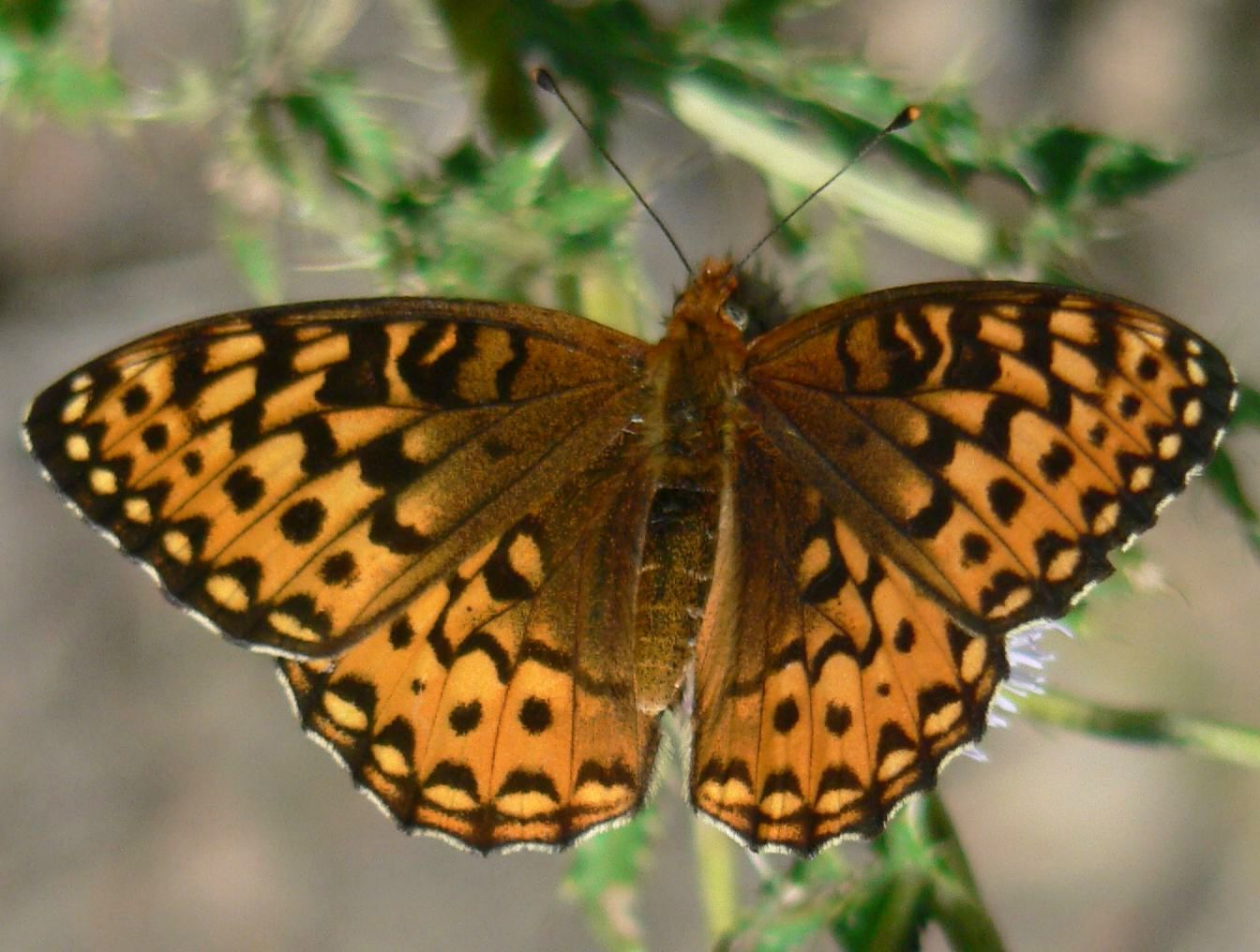

Conservation status
- Secure (NatureServe)

Scientific classification
- Kingdom: Animalia
- Phylum: Arthropoda
- Clade: Pancrustacea
- Class: Insecta
- Order: Lepidoptera
- Family: Nymphalidae
- Genus: Speyeria
- Species: S. hydaspe

Binomial name
- Speyeria hydaspe (Boisduval, 1869)

= Speyeria hydaspe =

Hydaspe fritillary

Species of butterfly

Speyeria hydaspe, the Hydaspe fritillary, is a species of orange-brown butterfly found in the western portions of the United States and Canada. A small fritillary, it usually has cream-colored underwing spots, but the Vancouver Island subspecies has silver spots. It is similar to S. zerene and S. atlantis, but may be distinguished by the smooth and even appearance of its postmedian spotband. The caterpillars feed on violets including Viola glabella. A single brood flies from July through September and feeds on flower nectar. They may be found in moist forests, in clearings and subalpine meadows.
