= McKenzie River (Oregon) =

River in Oregon, U.S.

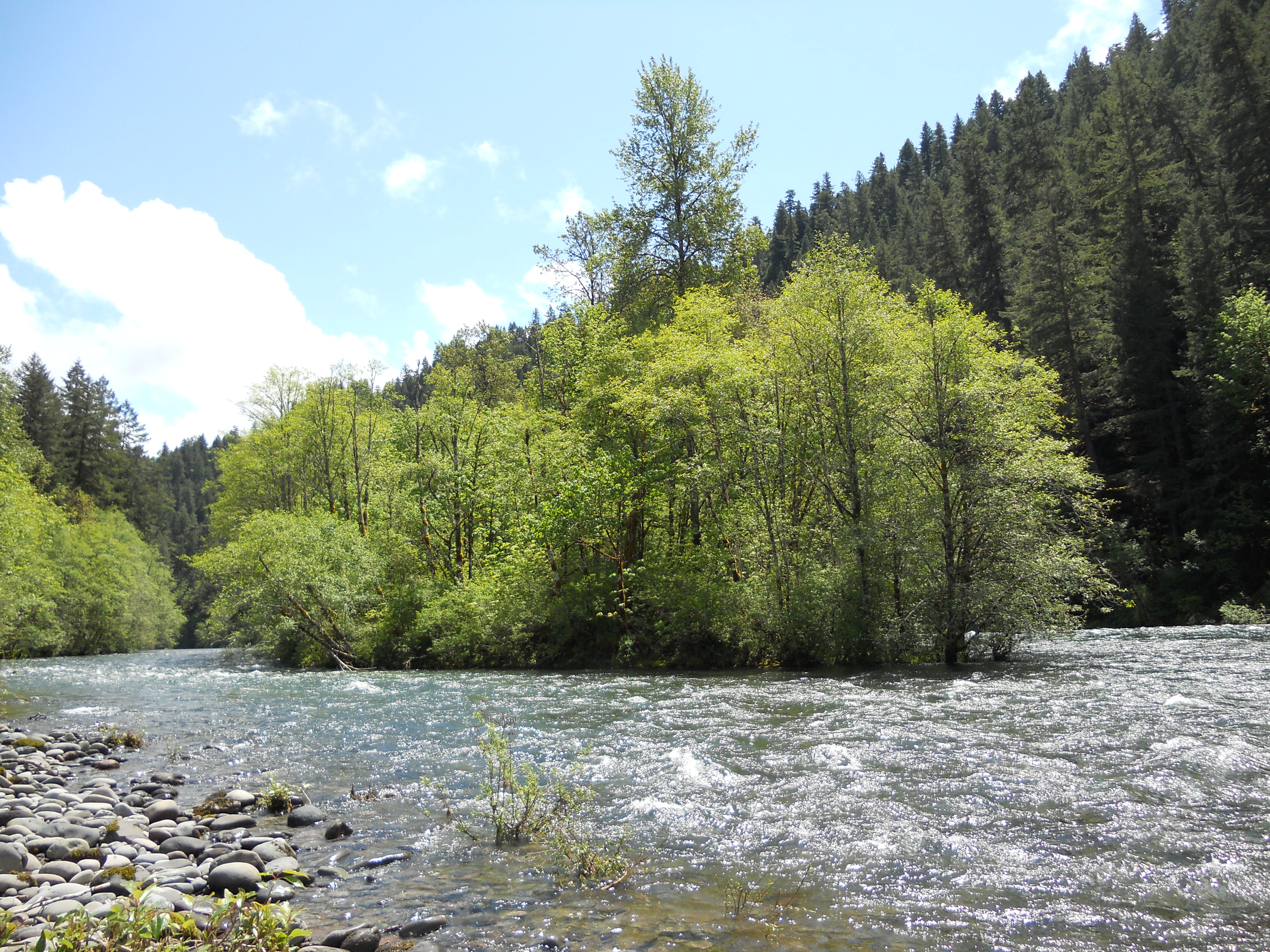
- An island in the upper McKenzie

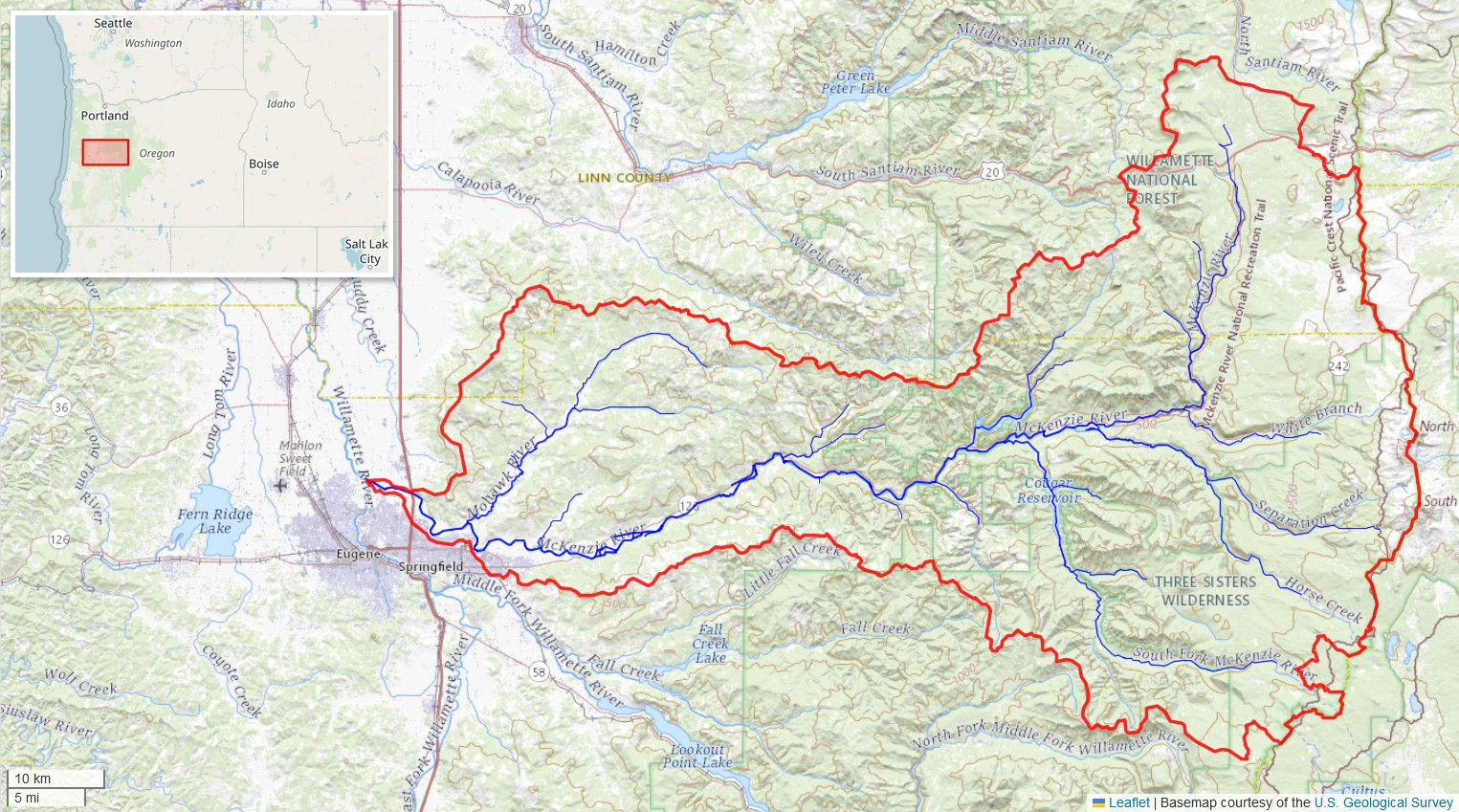
- McKenzie River watershed (Interactive map)

Location
- Country: United States
- State: Oregon
- Counties: Lane, Linn

Physical characteristics
- Source: Clear Lake
  - location: Cascade Range, Linn County
  - coordinates: 44°21′37″N 121°59′39″W
  - elevation: 3,570 ft (1,090 m)
- Mouth: Willamette River
  - location: Lane County
  - coordinates: 44°7′32″N 123°6′20″W
  - elevation: 371 ft (113 m)
- Length: 90 mi (140 km)
- Basin size: 1,300 sq mi (3,400 km^{2})
- Discharge
  - location: river mile 7.2 at Armitage Bridge near Coburg
  - average: 5,905 cu ft/s (167.2 m^{3}/s)
  - minimum: 1,080 cu ft/s (31 m^{3}/s)
  - maximum: 88,200 cu ft/s (2,500 m^{3}/s)

National Wild and Scenic River
- Type: Recreational
- Designated: October 28, 1988

The McKenzie River is a 90-mile (145 km) tributary of the Willamette River in western Oregon in the United States. It drains part of the Cascade Range east of Eugene and flows westward into the southernmost end of the Willamette Valley. It is named for Donald McKenzie, a Scottish Canadian fur trader who explored parts of the Pacific Northwest for the Pacific Fur Company in the early 19th century. As of the 21st century, six large dams have been built on the McKenzie and its tributaries.

== Course ==
The McKenzie River originates as the outflow of Clear Lake in the high Cascades of eastern Linn County in the Willamette National Forest. (Clear Lake is fed by Ikenick Creek and Fish Lake Creek, the latter of which flows from Fish Lake (Linn County, Oregon). Fish Lake's main tributary is Hackleman Creek, which drains the north side of Browder Ridge east of Tombstone Pass. U.S. Route 20 crosses the pass and follows Hackleman Creek.) The McKenzie River flows south from Clear Lake, paralleled by Oregon Route 126, and goes over the Sahalie and Koosah waterfalls to Carmen Reservoir, a man-made lake from which the river is then diverted into a 2-mile (3.2 km) tunnel to Smith Reservoir. Between Carmen Reservoir and Tamolitch Falls, the riverbed is dry for 3 miles (4.8 km) because lava from Belknap Crater buried that stretch of the river about 1,600 years ago. The river flows under the lava for those three miles and re-surfaces at Tamolitch Pool at the base of Tamolitch Falls. It then flows south into Trail Bridge Reservoir, where the Smith River enters from the right. After passing through Trail Bridge Dam, the river enters Lane County. The McKenzie continues south to Belknap Springs, where it turns west and flows past the community of McKenzie Bridge. It receives the South Fork McKenzie River about three miles east of Blue River. (The South Fork rises near the Pacific Crest Trail in the Three Sisters Wilderness and flows north-northwest for about 30 miles (48 km) through Cougar Reservoir and Cougar Dam.)

After the South Fork confluence, the main stem of the McKenzie River continues west through a narrow valley in the mountains, receiving the Blue River from the north at the community of Blue River. The McKenzie then passes Vida and continues to Leaburg and Walterville. The McKenzie valley widens as the river continues west, receiving the Mohawk River from the northeast just north of Springfield. Emerging from the Cascade foothills, the McKenzie enters a broad floodplain. It joins the Willamette River from the east 5 miles (8 km) north of Eugene.

== Watershed ==
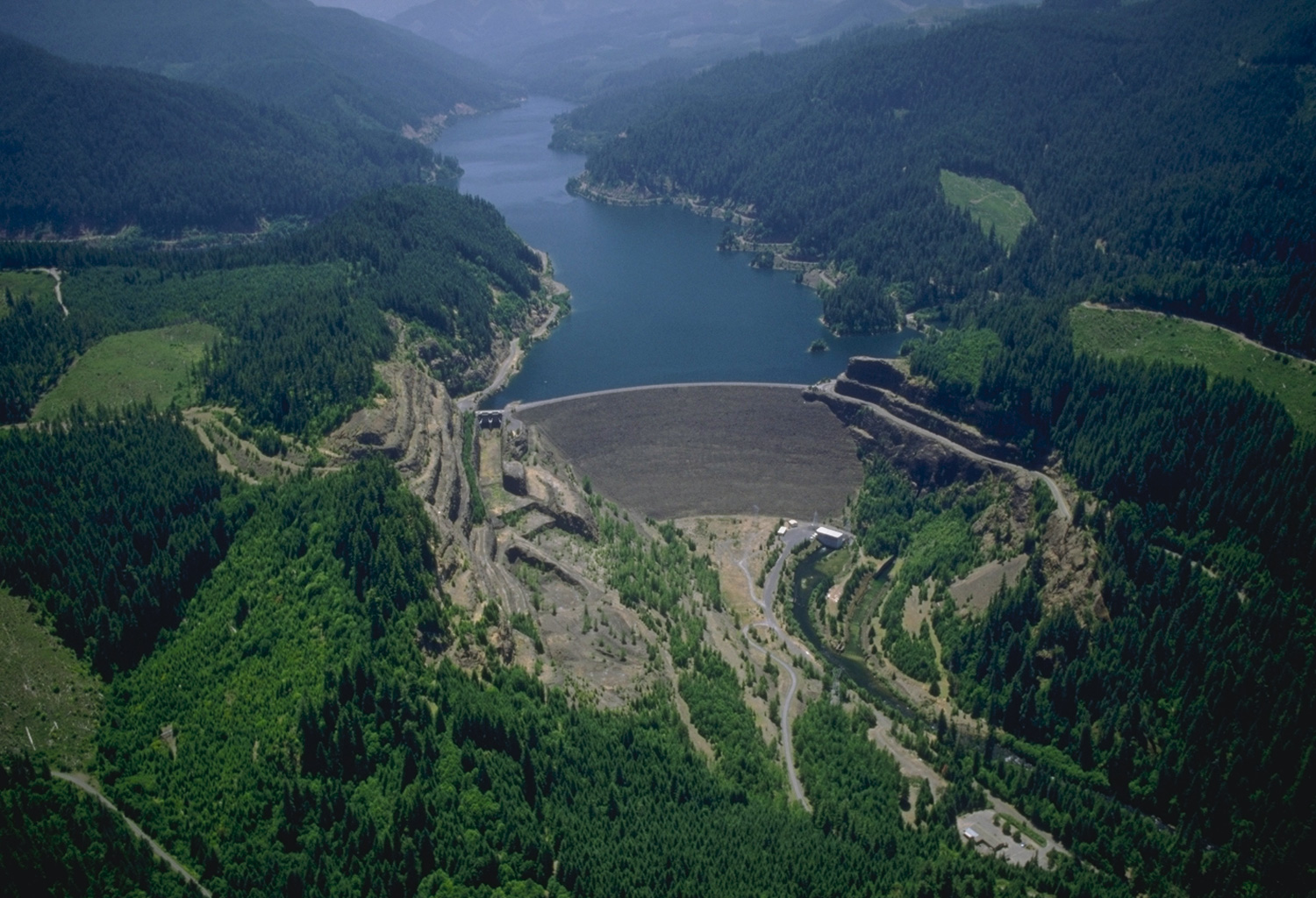
Cougar Dam and reservoir on the South Fork McKenzie River

The McKenzie River drains a region of about 1,300 square miles (3,400 km^{2}) and is one of the primary tributaries of the Willamette River. Elevations in the watershed range from 10,358 feet (3,157 m) at the summit of the South Sister to 375 feet (114 m) at the McKenzie's mouth on the Willamette River north of Eugene. The upper basin, in the high Cascades, consists of granular, permeable igneous rocks that are geologically young, while most of the middle and lower McKenzie valley in the Western Cascades is made of the remnants of older, more weathered volcanic rocks. Major watersheds bordering the McKenzie basin include the Calapooia; the South, Middle and North Santiam rivers to the north; the Middle Fork Willamette River to the south; and the Deschutes River to the east.

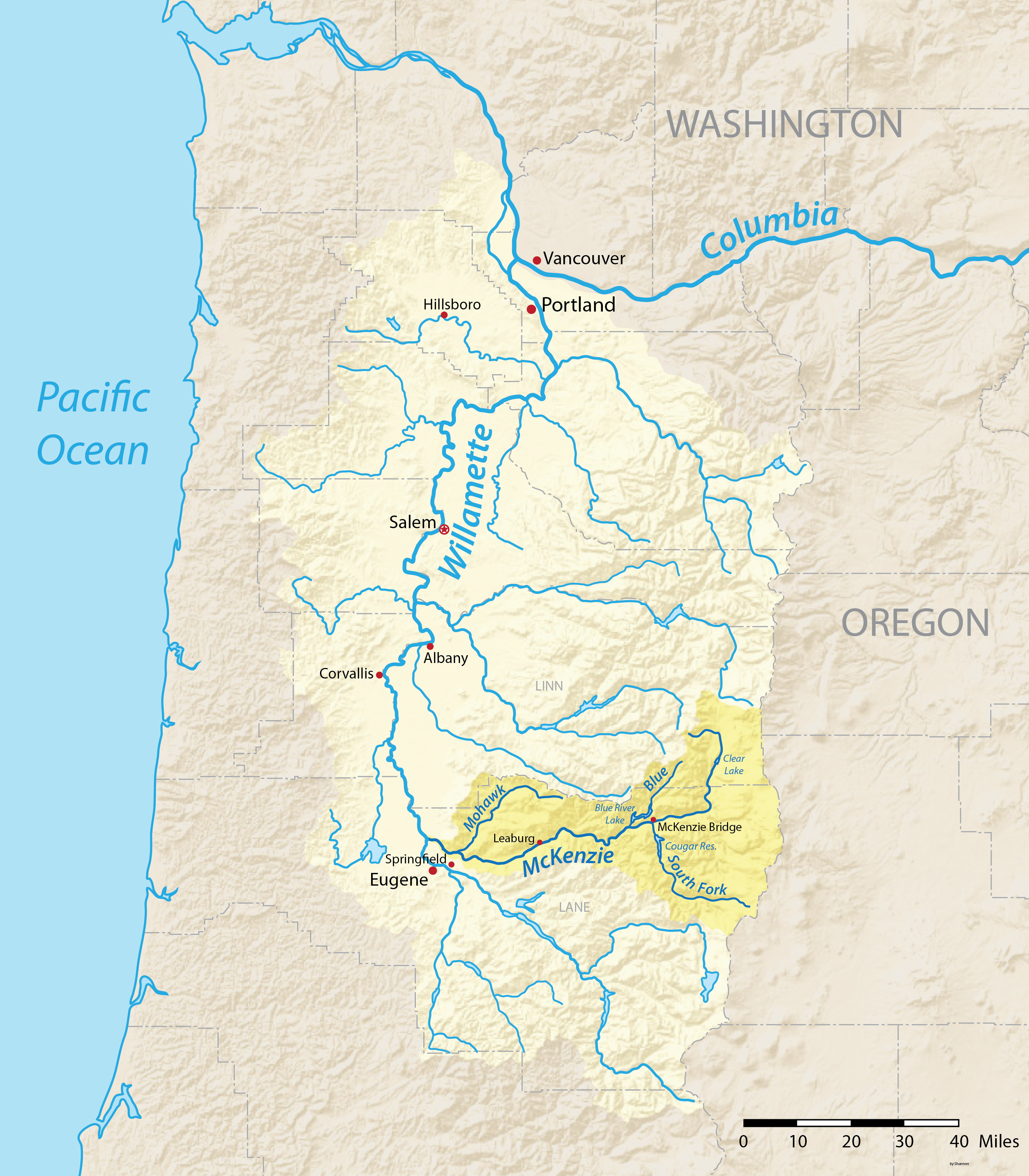
Map of the Willamette River basin with the McKenzie River highlighted

Most of the watershed is lightly populated; about 70 percent of it is public land managed by the U.S. Government, of which about 39 percent is the Three Sisters Wilderness. Over 96 percent of the basin is forested, just under 4 percent is devoted to agricultural use—mainly farms and orchards on the lower floodplain—and the remainder is residential or industrial. Most of the public land is part of the Willamette National Forest and is important for logging and recreation. The river is the sole tap water source for the cities of Eugene and Springfield, fulfilling the water needs of about 200,000 people. The Eugene Water & Electric Board (EWEB) utility draws the water at river mile (RM) 11 or river kilometer (RK) 18 in Springfield. Water quality in the river is rated good to excellent, with better quality upstream than downstream. Principal sources of contaminants in the McKenzie are agriculture and residential development, including septic systems. Small amounts of herbicides detected in the river and some of its tributaries may be from aerial spraying by timber companies for forestry.

The region has a temperate climate with wet winters and dry summers. About 90 percent of precipitation in the watershed comes between October and May. Precipitation in the basin varies greatly with elevation; about 40 inches (1,000 mm) fall annually in the Willamette Valley, while the Three Sisters in the high Cascades can receive 125 inches (3,200 mm) in a year. Above 4,000 feet (1,200 m), about 35 percent of precipitation falls as snow, and at 7,000 feet (2,100 m) and higher, over 75 percent of precipitation is snowfall. At these elevations, melting snow beginning in the spring season brings more cold water out of springs under the permeable rock, increasing the McKenzie's flow and maintaining cold water temperatures in the river and its tributaries. Along the lower McKenzie, however, winter rain slides easily off the less permeable rock and erodes sediment into the river.

=== Engineering ===
There are six major dams in the McKenzie River watershed—three on the river and three each on a different tributary of the McKenzie. The three dams on the McKenzie's main stem form Carmen Reservoir, Trail Bridge Reservoir, and Leaburg Reservoir, respectively. The other dams in the watershed are the Smith River dam on the Smith River in the upper basin, Cougar Dam on the South Fork McKenzie River, and Blue River Dam on the Blue River. The Carmen Diversion Dam is the uppermost dam on the McKenzie, located less than 2 miles (3.2 km) south of Clear Lake, the McKenzie River's source. Water from Carmen Reservoir is diverted southwest through a tunnel to Smith Reservoir on the Smith River. Through both the Smith River and another tunnel, water in Smith Reservoir moves south to the Carmen Power Plant, then into Trail Bridge Reservoir—which the McKenzie joins—and through the power-producing Trail Bridge Dam. The engineered system is called the Carmen–Smith Hydroelectric Project, and it has been used by the Eugene Water & Electric Board since 1963 to generate electricity for EWEB customers. The system's generating capacity is 114 megawatts (MW).

EWEB also owns and manages two power-producing canals farther downstream along the McKenzie River. The Walterville Canal, completed in 1910, and the Leaburg Canal, completed in 1930, each contain water diverted from the McKenzie to produce electricity. Most of the water is returned to the river after power production.

=== Communities ===
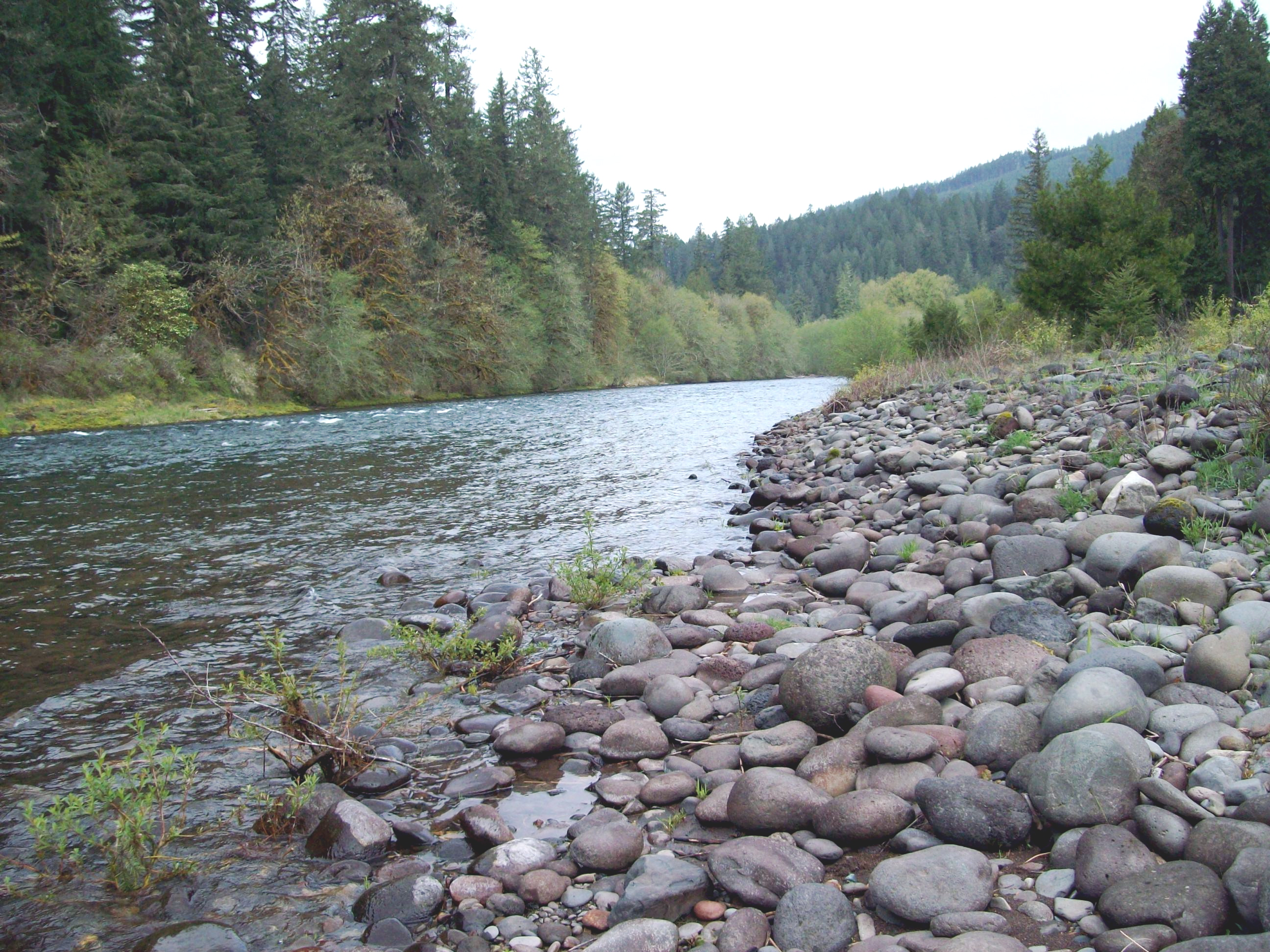
The McKenzie at Nimrod

The eastern portion of Oregon Route 126 passes through the valley of the McKenzie River, closely following the river for much of its route. The 60-mile (97 km) stretch of the river from the edge of the Springfield metro area eastward to the Cascades is known as the McKenzie Valley. The following communities, listed west to east, are in the valley: Cedar Flat, Walterville, Deerhorn, Leaburg, Vida, Nimrod, Finn Rock, Blue River, Rainbow, McKenzie Bridge, and Belknap Springs.

== History ==
For about 8,000 years, the McKenzie River has been home to Native Americans. In more recent history, Kalapuya and Molala tribes lived nomadically in the summer and spent winters in the lower valley. This way of life continued until the mid-19th century, when many natives died of disease or were relocated to reservations.

The first recorded exploration of the river occurred in the spring of 1812, when the Pacific Fur Company reached the McKenzie via the Willamette River, as part of a larger exploration led by Donald McKenzie. The company had established a post in 1811 at Fort Astoria at the mouth of the Columbia River for the Astor Expedition. McKenzie, the following spring, formed a party to explore the Willamette River. The party found a large tributary of the Willamette River and named it after McKenzie. However, much of the McKenzie River remained largely unvisited by white settlers and explorers until October 1853, when a group of Oregon Trail settlers became lost trying to cross the Cascades into the Willamette Valley via the Elliott Cutoff.

In 1910, travelers completed the first automobile crossing over McKenzie Pass. However, crossing along the river was limited to summer because winter conditions closed the pass. Year-round travel was not possible until 1960, with the completion of a road over Santiam Pass.

== Flora and fauna ==
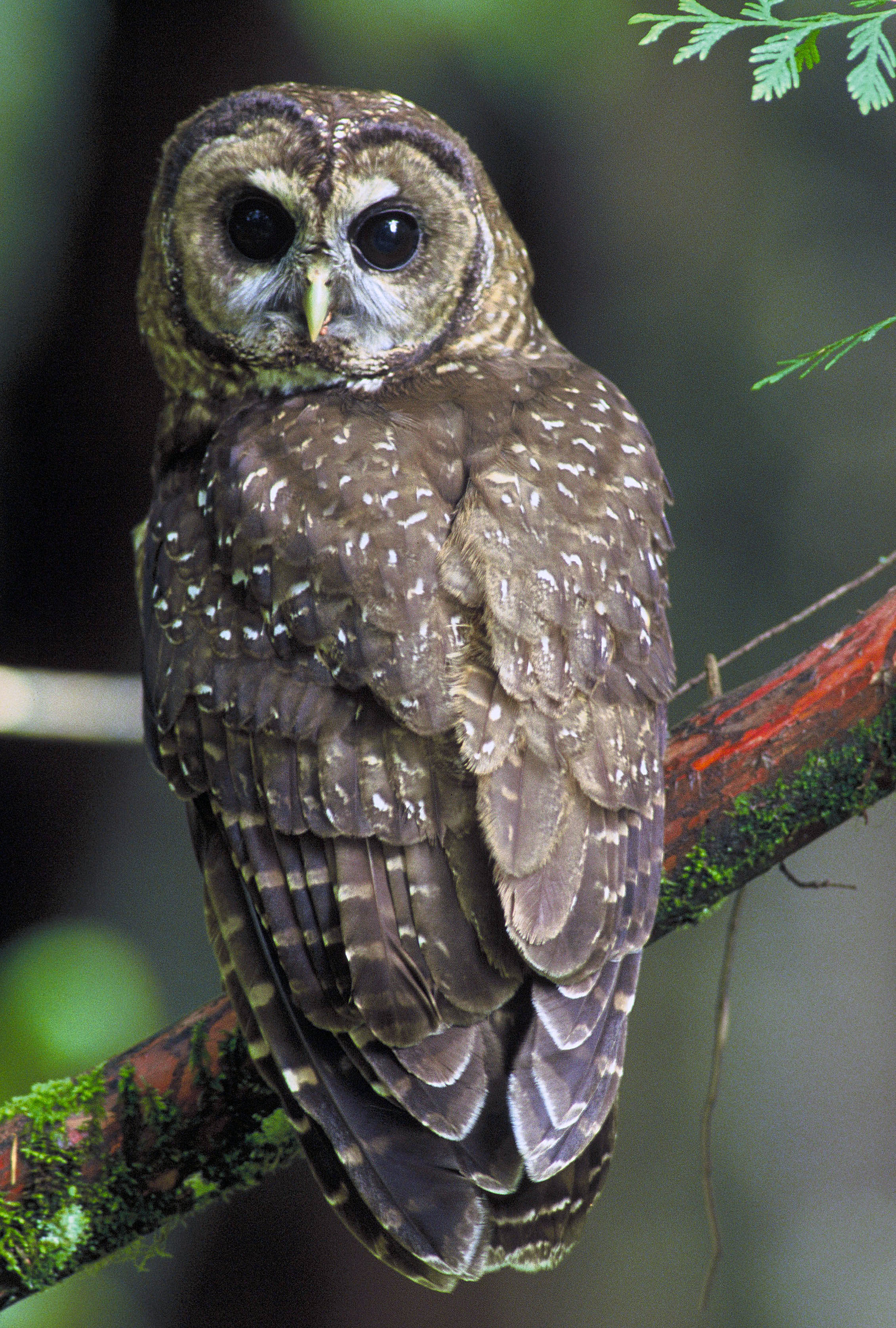
Northern spotted owl in the McKenzie watershed

Fish in the McKenzie River and some of its tributaries include spring Chinook salmon, mountain whitefish, and bull, cutthroat and rainbow trout. Dippers, mergansers, bald eagles, ospreys, and various ducks feed on the fish. The threatened northern spotted owl inhabits dense forest on the west side of the upper McKenzie basin in Linn County.

Forests of Douglas fir, western hemlock, and western red cedar cover the vast majority of the watershed.

== Recreation ==
The McKenzie River is popular for boating—especially fishing, kayaking, and whitewater rafting. The McKenzie River dory (or drift boat), specifically designed for use in whitewater, was first developed on the Mckenzie in the 1940s; adaptations of this design quickly grew in popularity on other Western rivers such as the Rogue and the Colorado. Boating is also common on Blue River Reservoir and Cougar Reservoir. Hiking and mountain biking are popular activities on trails in the McKenzie watershed. Trails include the 26.5-mile (42.6 km) McKenzie River National Recreation Trail, which follows much of the upper McKenzie.

Most whitewater rafting takes place between Quartz Creek and Helfrich Boat launch. This segment is roughly nine miles long and has three rapids, Browns Hole, Mamma's Pies, and Marten's Rapid (Class III). There are also a couple of smaller surfer rapids that kayakers typically stop at.

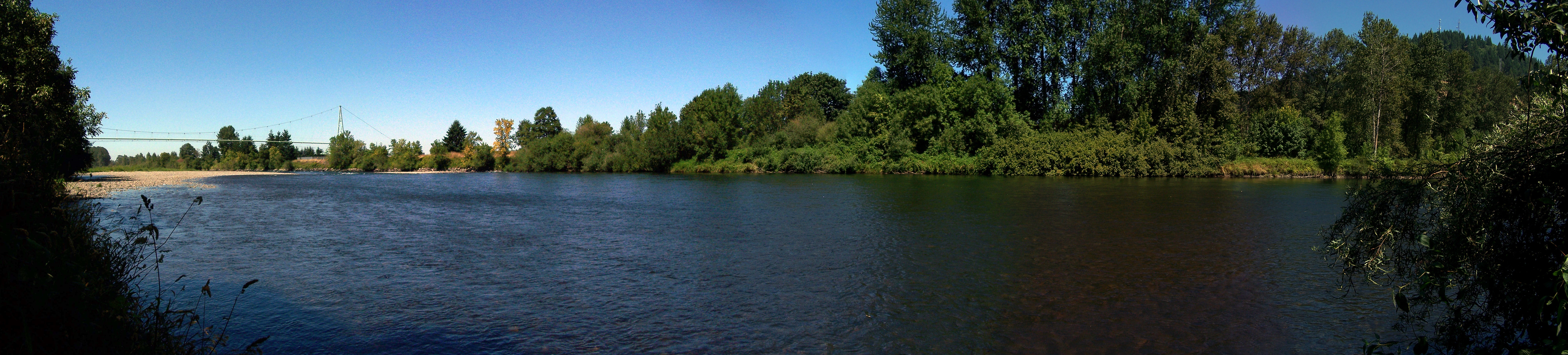
The McKenzie at Armitage County Park south of Coburg, near its mouth on the Willamette River

== See also ==
- Holiday Farm Fire
- List of longest streams of Oregon
- List of rivers of Oregon

== Works cited ==
- Mackenzie, Cecil Walter (1937). Donald Mackenzie, "King of the Northwest". Los Angeles, California: I. Deach, Jr. OCLC 3023859.
- McArthur, Lewis (2003). Oregon Geographic Names. Portland: Oregon Historical Society Press. ISBN 0-87595-277-1.
- Morgenstern, Karl A.; Donahue, David; Toth, Nancy (January 2011). "McKenzie River Watershed Baseline Monitoring Report: 2000 to 2009" (PDF). Eugene Water & Electric Board. Archived from the original (PDF) on January 31, 2013.
- Risley, John; Wallick, J. Rose; Waite, Ian; Stonewall, Adam (2010). "Development of an Environmental Flow Framework for the McKenzie River Basin, Oregon" (PDF). Scientific Investigations Report 2010–5016. U.S. Geological Survey.
- Sullivan, William L. (2014). 100 Hikes in the Central Oregon Cascades (Fourth ed.). Eugene, Oregon: Navillus Press. ISBN 978-0981570174.
