= Vida, Oregon =

Former unincorporated community in Oregon, United States

- Unincorporated community
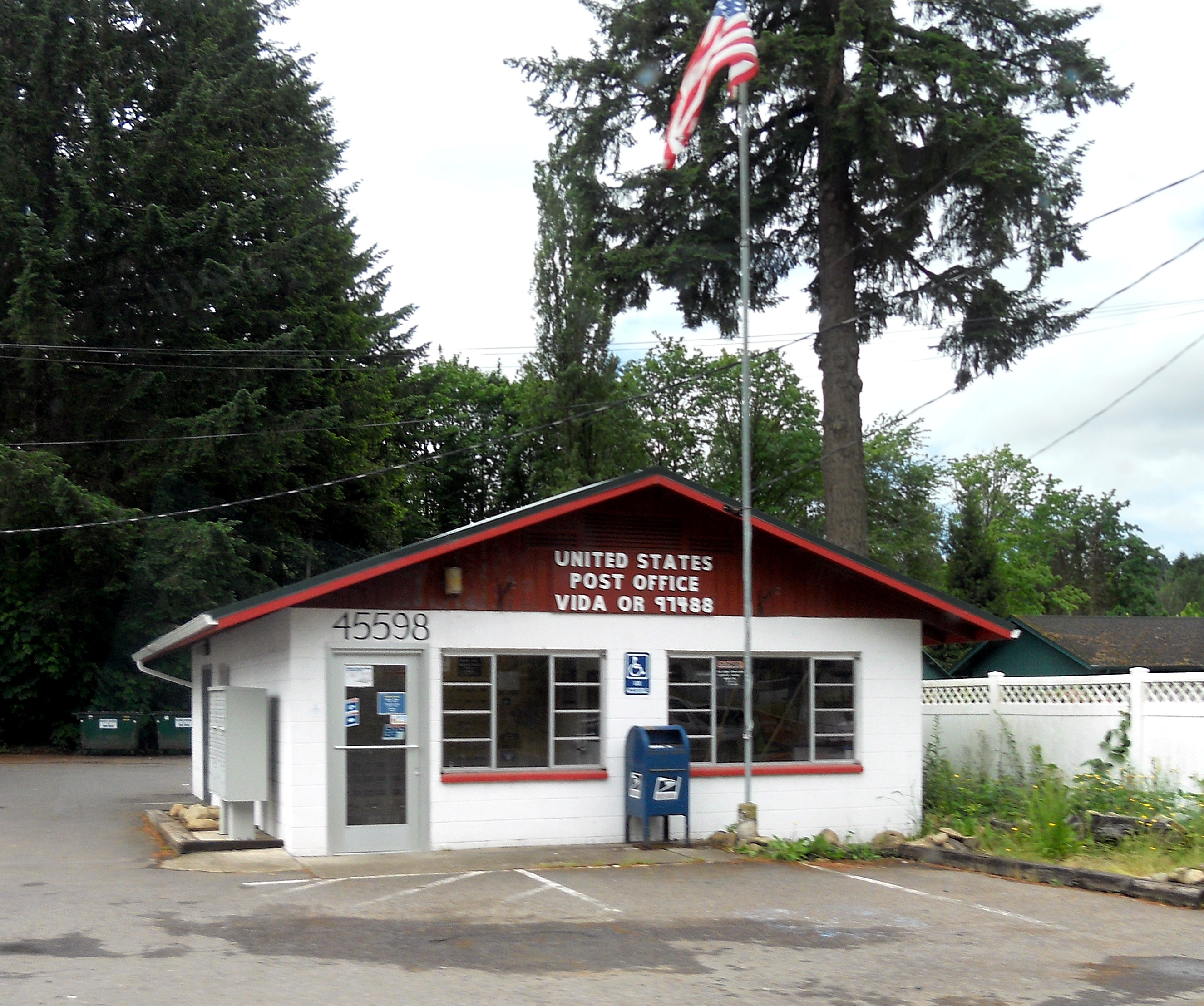
- Vida post office

- Location within Oregon Location within the United States
- Coordinates: 44°08′45″N 122°34′11″W
- Country: United States
- State: Oregon
- County: Lane
- Elevation: 804 ft (245 m)
- Time zone: UTC-8 (Pacific (PST))
  - Summer (DST): UTC-7 (PDT)
- ZIP code: 97488
- Area codes: 458 and 541
- GNIS feature ID: 1128536

Vida is an unincorporated community in Lane County, Oregon, United States. It is located on Oregon Route 126 and the McKenzie River.

Vida was originally named "Gate Creek", but this caused confusion with a community of "Gates Creek" in Washington County, so the name of the postmaster's daughter was selected instead. The Vida post office was established on April 12, 1898. The postmaster was Francis A. Pepiot.

Vida is home to the historic Goodpasture Bridge, a covered bridge that was added to the National Register of Historic Places in 1979. It is the second-longest covered bridge in Oregon.
