= Koosah Falls =

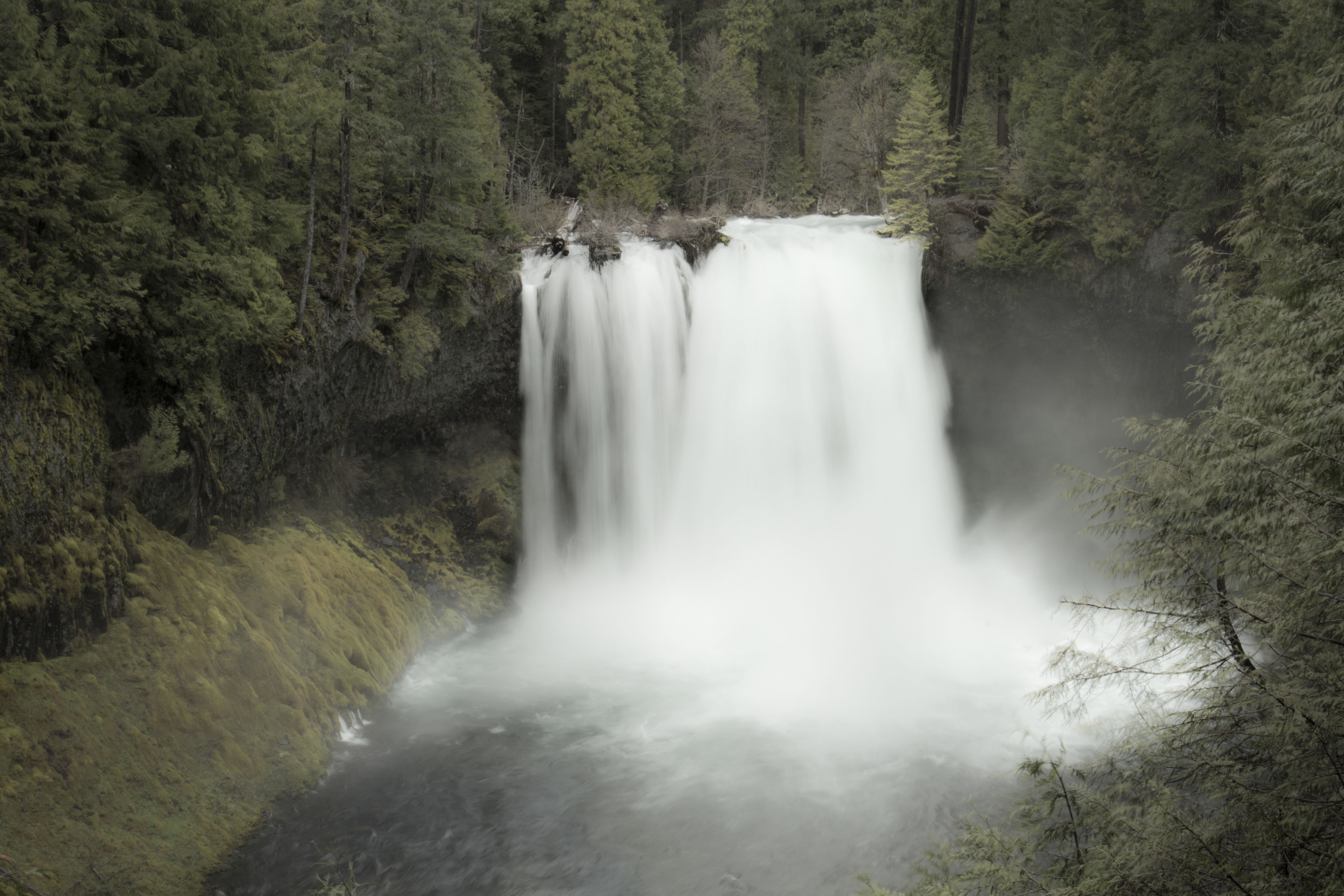
- Koosah Falls in the spring
- Interactive map of Koosah Falls
- Location: Linn County, Oregon, U.S.
- Coordinates: 44.34442°N 122.00048°W
- Type: Vertical Block
- Elevation: 2,707 ft (825 m)
- Total height: 64 ft (20 m)
- Number of drops: 1
- Average width: 60 ft (18 m)
- Average flow rate: 600 cu ft/s (17 m^{3}/s)

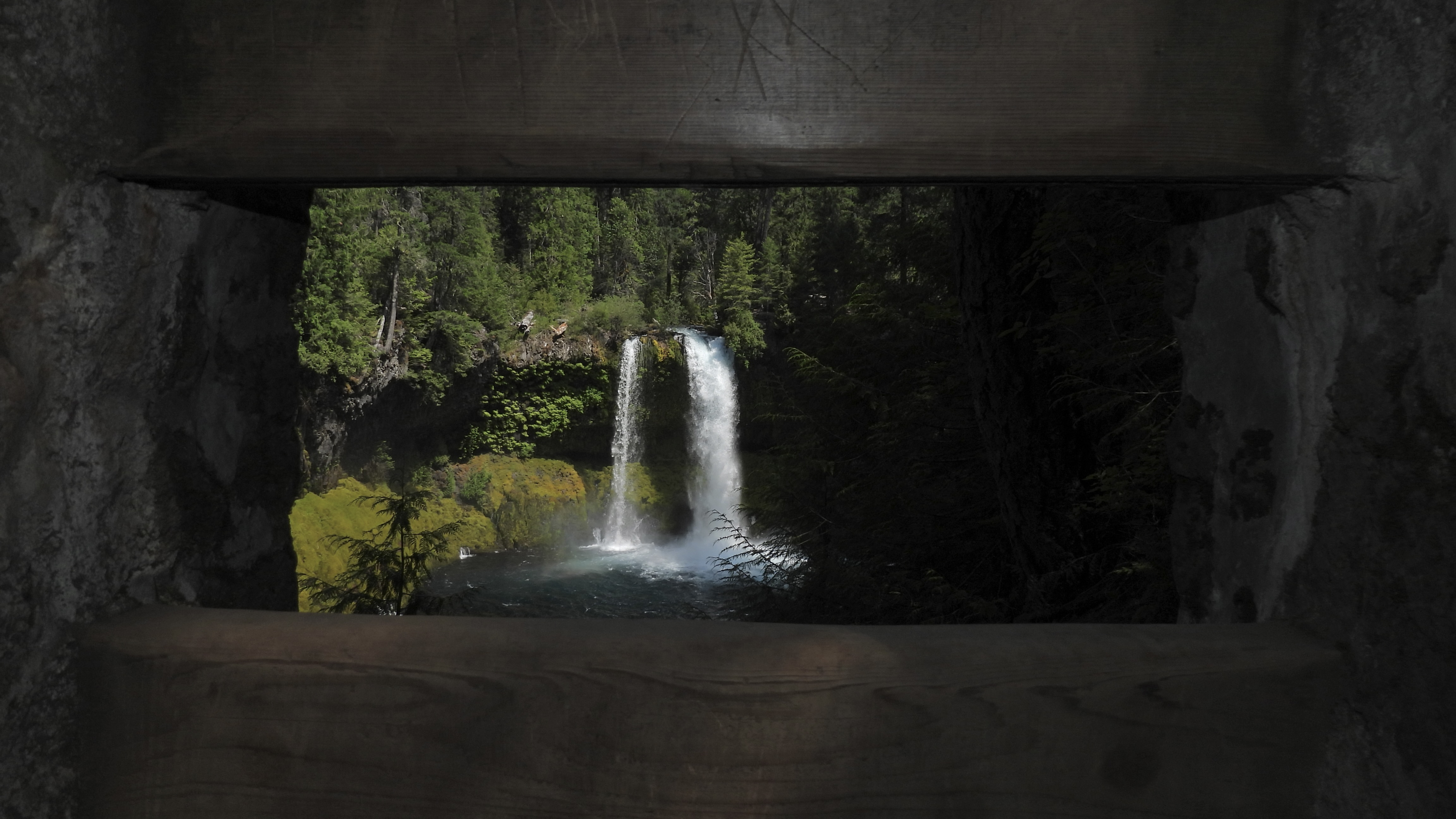
Koosah Falls in the summer

Koosah Falls, also known as Middle Falls, is the second of the three major waterfalls on the McKenzie River in the heart of the Willamette National Forest in Linn County, in the U.S. state of Oregon. The waterfall is notable for its main drop of 64 feet (20 m) that plunges into a considerable pool, south of Santiam Pass. Koosah Falls is located 0.5 miles (0.80 km) downstream south of Sahalie Falls, southeast of Salem, Oregon, northeast of Eugene, Oregon and west of Mt. Washington. The word koosah means "sky" in Chinook Jargon.

== See also ==
- List of waterfalls in Oregon
