= Sahalie Falls =

Waterfall in Oregon, US

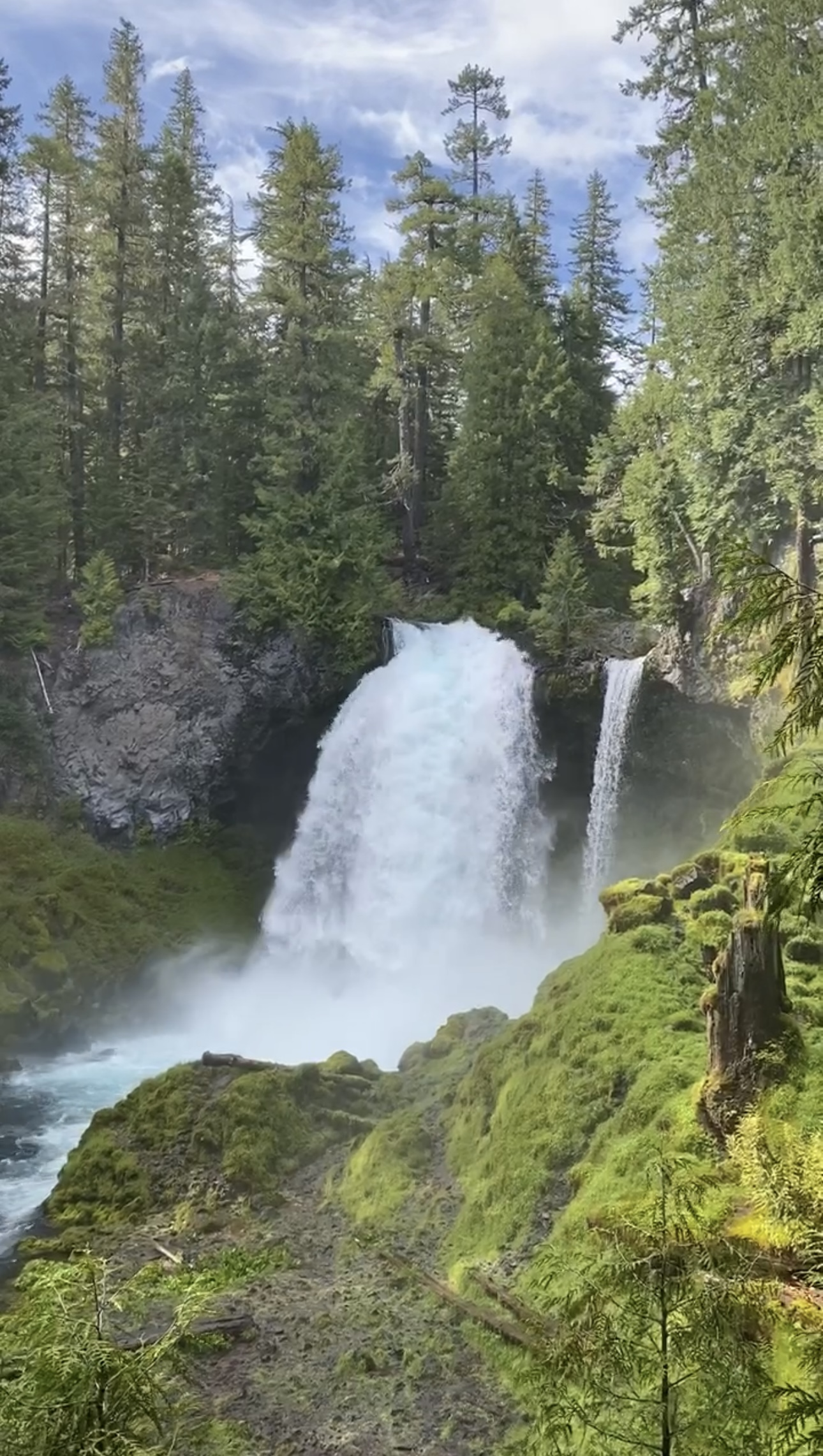
- Sahalie Falls
- Interactive map of Sahalie Falls
- Location: Linn County, Oregon, U.S.
- Coordinates: 44.3492°N 121.9972°W
- Type: Segmented Plunges
- Elevation: 2,850 ft (869 m)
- Total height: 73 ft (22 m)
- Number of drops: 1
- Average width: 30 ft (9 m)
- Watercourse: McKenzie River (Oregon)
- Average flow rate: 560 cu ft/s (16 m^{3}/s)

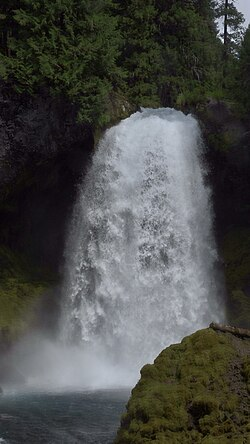
Summertime Sahalie Falls

Sahalie Falls, sometimes referred to as Upper Falls, is a plunging waterfall of the McKenzie River in Linn County, Oregon, United States. The falls are located on the eastern edge of the Willamette National Forest and alongside Oregon Route 126, 34.3 miles (55.2 km) west of the city of Sisters. The word sahalie is Chinook Jargon for "up," "above," or "heaven".

Sahalie Falls is 0.5 miles upstream from Koosah Falls and 1 mile downstream of the McKenzie River source at Clear Lake. The falls are 8 miles (13 km) directly west of and 5,000 ft (1,524 m) below the summit of Mount Washington.

The waterfall consists of a 73-foot (22 m) plunge, with year-round waterflow rates of 560 cu ft/s (16 m^{3}/s). There is a short access trail from the parking lot to the top of the falls, where visitors can get within twenty feet of the waterfall behind a railing. There is also access to a maintained viewpoint downstream of Plunge Pool.

== See also ==
- List of waterfalls in Oregon
