= Molala =

Native American tribe in present-day Oregon, US

The Molala are a Native American people of Oregon that originally resided in the Western Cascades. There are few recorded sources about the Molala, the majority being unpublished manuscripts. This assortment includes the works of Albert S. Gatschet, Franz Boas, Leo J. Frachtenberg, Philip Drucker, Melville Jacobs, and Leslie Spier.

Descendants of the Molala reside on the Confederated Tribes of the Grand Ronde Community of Oregon, Confederated Tribes of Siletz Indians, and the Klamath Tribes. In the 1950s 141 of the 882 Grand Ronde Reservation members claimed Molala descent.

== Origin of name ==
The designation Molala is considered to have originated from the Clackamas muláliš. Variants in written literature include Molalla, Molallie, Mólale, Molále, Molele, Moolalle. Related terms used by neighboring indigenous included mólališ by the Wasco and Tenino, and mulé•lis by the Kalapuyans. The Tenino additionally referred to the Molalas as łytilpam and táytilpam, likely borrowed by the Cayuse as tlĭ-tŭn-pŭm. The Molalas were called kúikni by the Klamath.

== Homeland ==
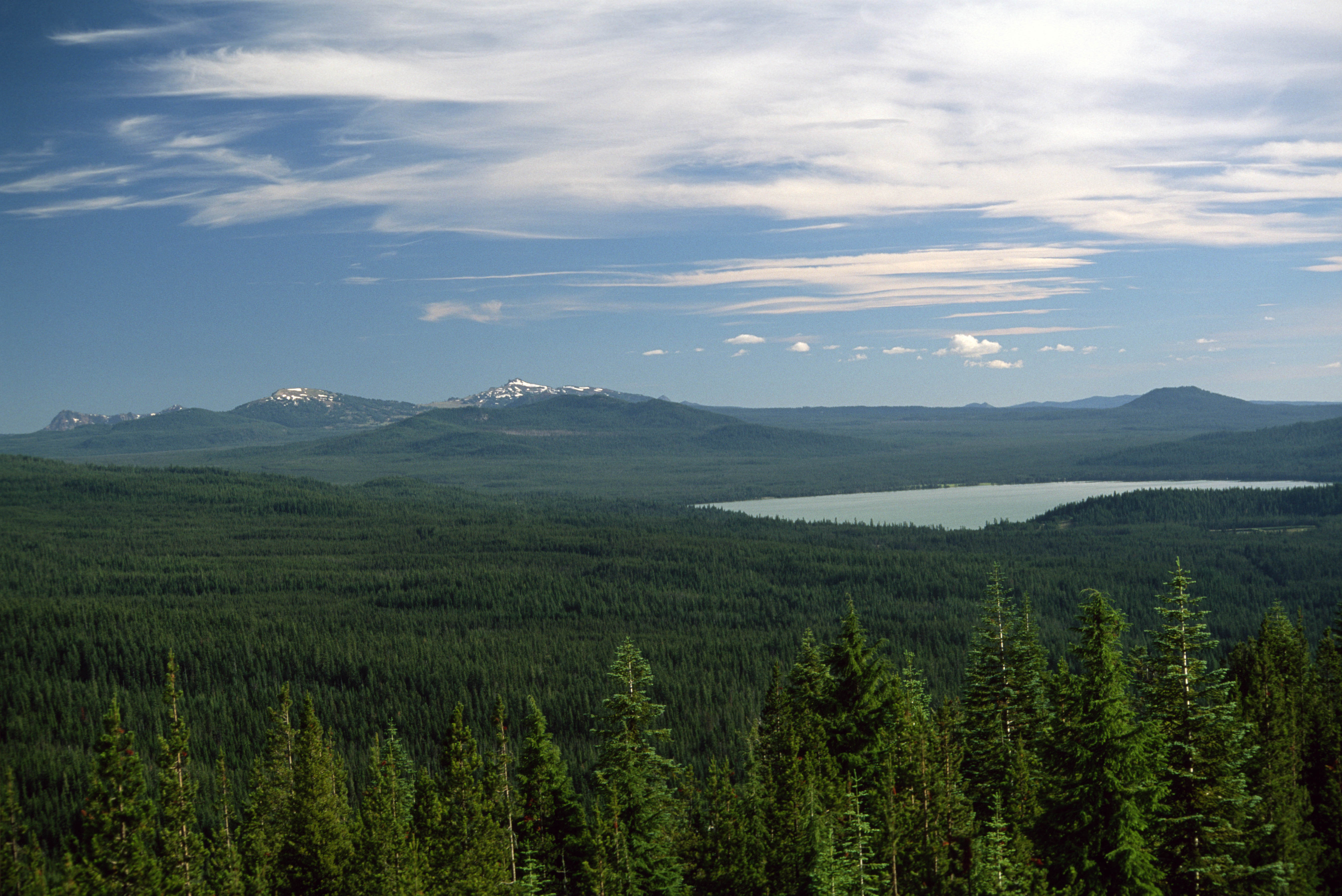
A view of the Umpqua National Forest, part of the Molala homeland

Molala territory once stretched across the Western Cascades; from Mount Hood and the Molalla River in the north to the Rogue headwaters in the south. Dense forests of western hemlock, Douglas fir, and western red cedar inundated the region. Fire was utilized by the Molala to create openings in these dense stands for preferred food resources.

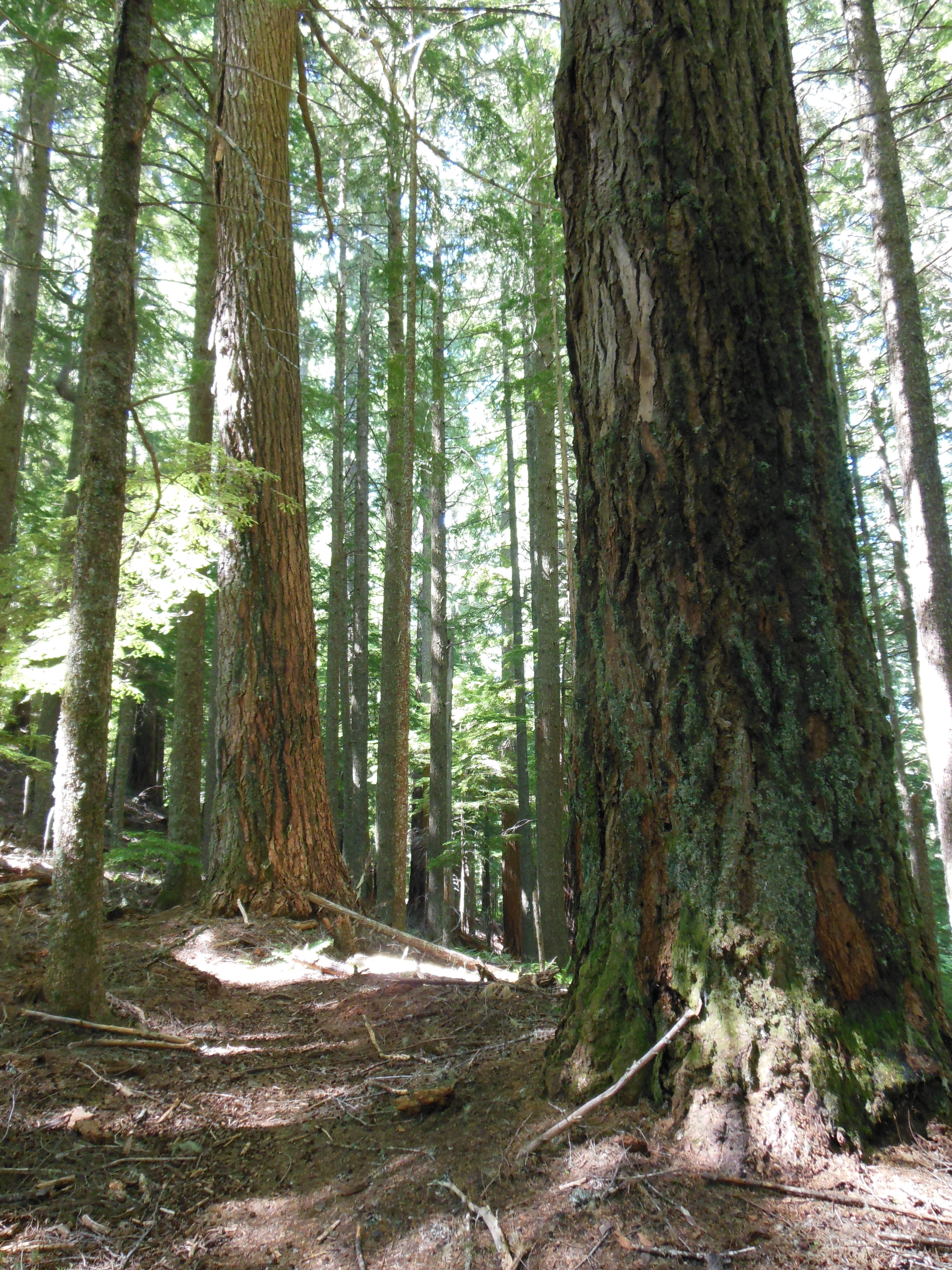
A mixed western hemlock and Douglas fir canopy

In his 1846 work Hale placed the Molala as largely between the Deschutes River and the Eastern Cascades. In 1891 John Wesley Powell considered the Molala to have once "occupied a belt of mountain country south of the Columbia River, chiefly about Mounts Hood and Jefferson."

=== Tygh Valley origin hypothesis ===
In 1928 James Teit presented the idea that the Molala once resided in Tygh Valley. He claimed pressure from the Northern Paiute forced the Molala to relocate to the Western Cascades. Joel V. Berreman accepted Teit's hypothesis and in 1937 expanded upon it.

The three informants used by Teit were appraised as being invalid by other scholars. None were descendants or related to the Molala, Northern Paiute, or the Tenino. According to George Murdock this didn't "constitute an adequate basis for a definitive reconstruction of the history" of these native societies.

In the 1930s Tenino informants of the Warm Springs Reservation told Murdock that Molalas once had a winter village in Tygh Valley. Large quantities of Sockeye salmon and Columbia River redband trout were gathered every spring along the Deschutes River at Sherars Falls. According to Murdock, sometime in the early 19th century, coveting this bountiful resource, Tenino warriors forced the Molala to flee to the western Cascades.

During the 1960s, Rigsby interviewed several informants at the Warm Springs Reservation to match Murdock's narrative. No one recalled stories of conflict with the Molala, or of their supposed eviction from Tygh Valley. One informant stated that after the fish runs ended in the Willamette Valley, certain Molala would travel to Sherars Falls to continue fishing.

After a decade of work among the Wascos and Sahaptins of Warm Springs, David H. French determined that Sahaptin inhabitation of Tygh Valley and utilization of the Deschutes Watershed predated the 19th century. Both French and Rigsby concluded the regional resources were jointly used by Sahaptin speakers, Wasco-Wishram peoples, and the Northern Paiute. The Molala perhaps visited but didn't permanently inhabit the area during the 19th century.

== Culture ==
=== Society ===
Molala society was centered upon winter villages. Usually these were composed of a single extended family and placed in low-elevation locations. Winter homesteads were made of red cedar and western hemlock planks and semi-subterranean. Summer homes were unexcavated and composed of either thatch or bark.

When seasonal resources became available the family would separate into smaller groups to exploit and gather them. Due to these population trends leadership among the Molala was in turn quite decentralized, localized, and task-orientated. The wealthiest individuals of a village were referred to as yaʔqánt by the Molala or simply chiefs by settlers. Assistance to relatives was the primary source of yaʔqánt influence. Ownership of slaves and horses, along with animal hides and dentalium crafts, were the primary sources of wealth in Molala society.

=== Subdivisions ===
The Molala were initially separated into two groups by scholars, although evidence of a third division exists. However, little is recorded of the linguistic and cultural diversity among the Molala peoples. The three reported groupings are the Southern Molala, the Upper Santiam Molala, and the Northern Molala.

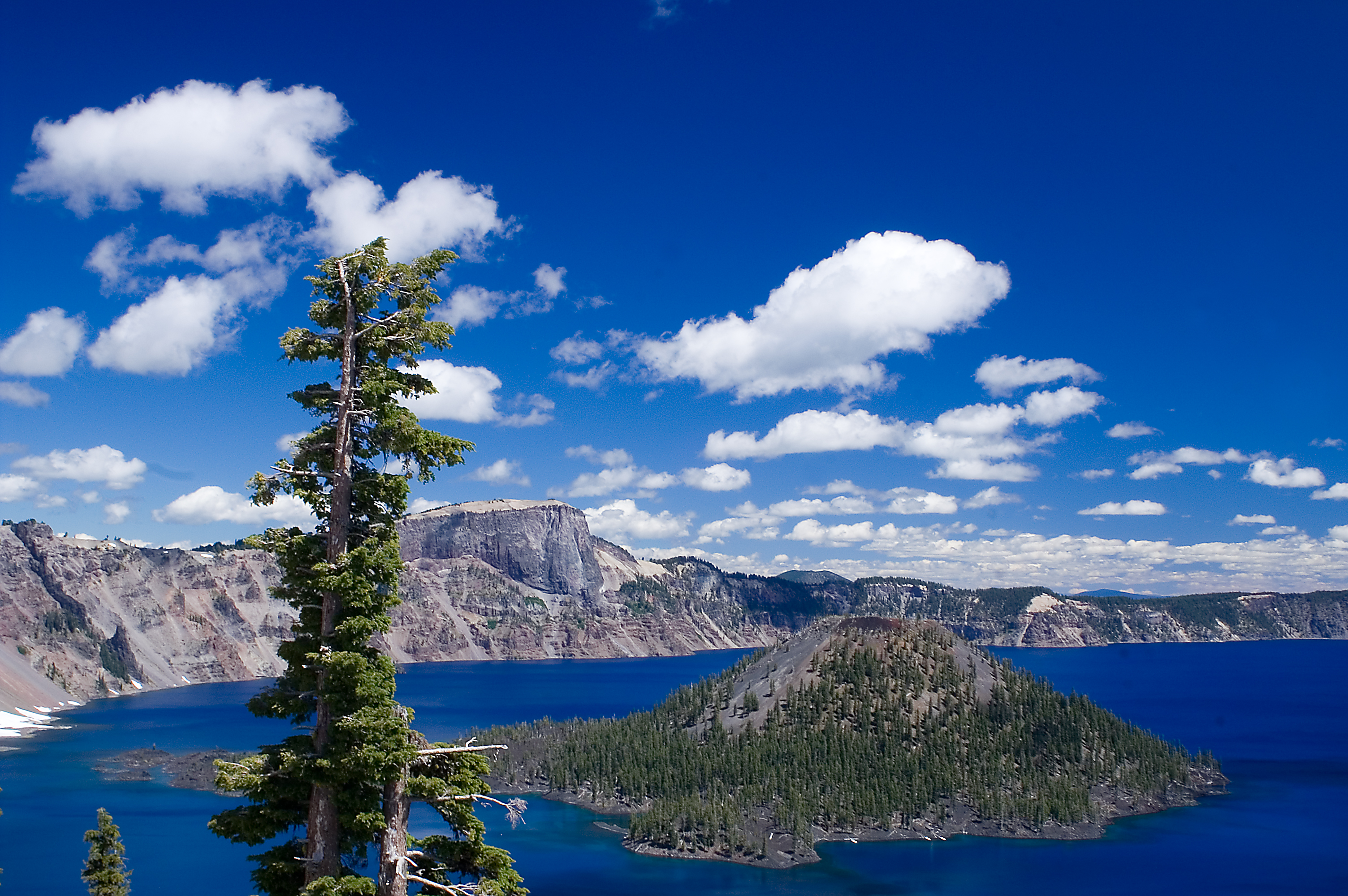
Crater Lake

The Southern Molala inhabited the headwaters of the Rogue and Umpqua Rivers along the bases of Crater Lake and Mount McLoughlin. They were called tulǽyaŋsi, far-off people, by the Northern Molala, while the Klamath referred to them as čakġe•nkni•, "Serviceberry-Area-People" or "People of the Serviceberry Tract."

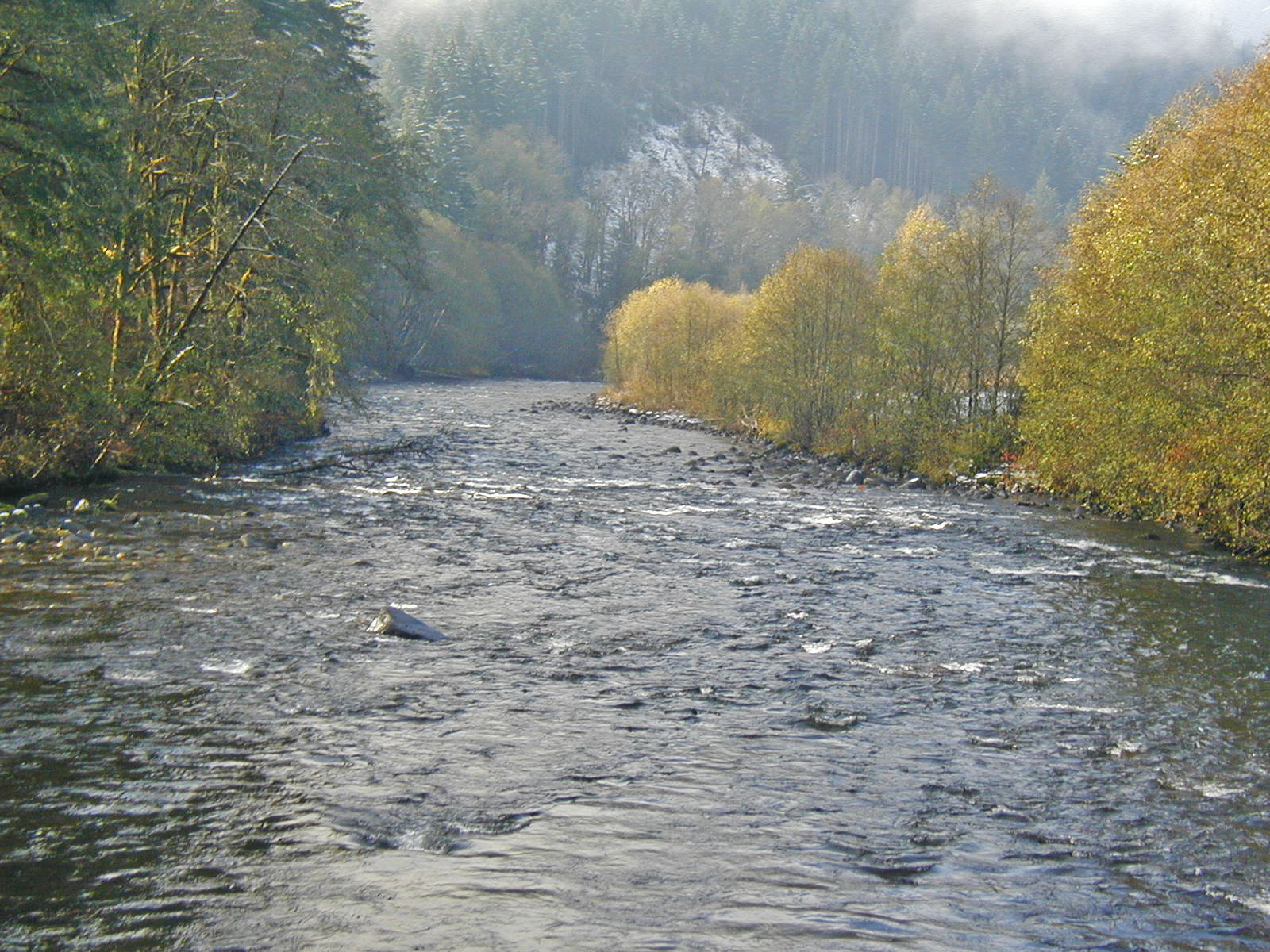
The North Santiam River

Molala of the Santiam River are called the "Upper Santiam Molala" by ethnologists to differentiate them from the neighboring Santiam Kalapuyans. Franz Boas recorded čimbú•ihe as a native settlement outside Albany, which was later reported by Albert S. Gatschet as a Molala village located on the Santiam headwaters.

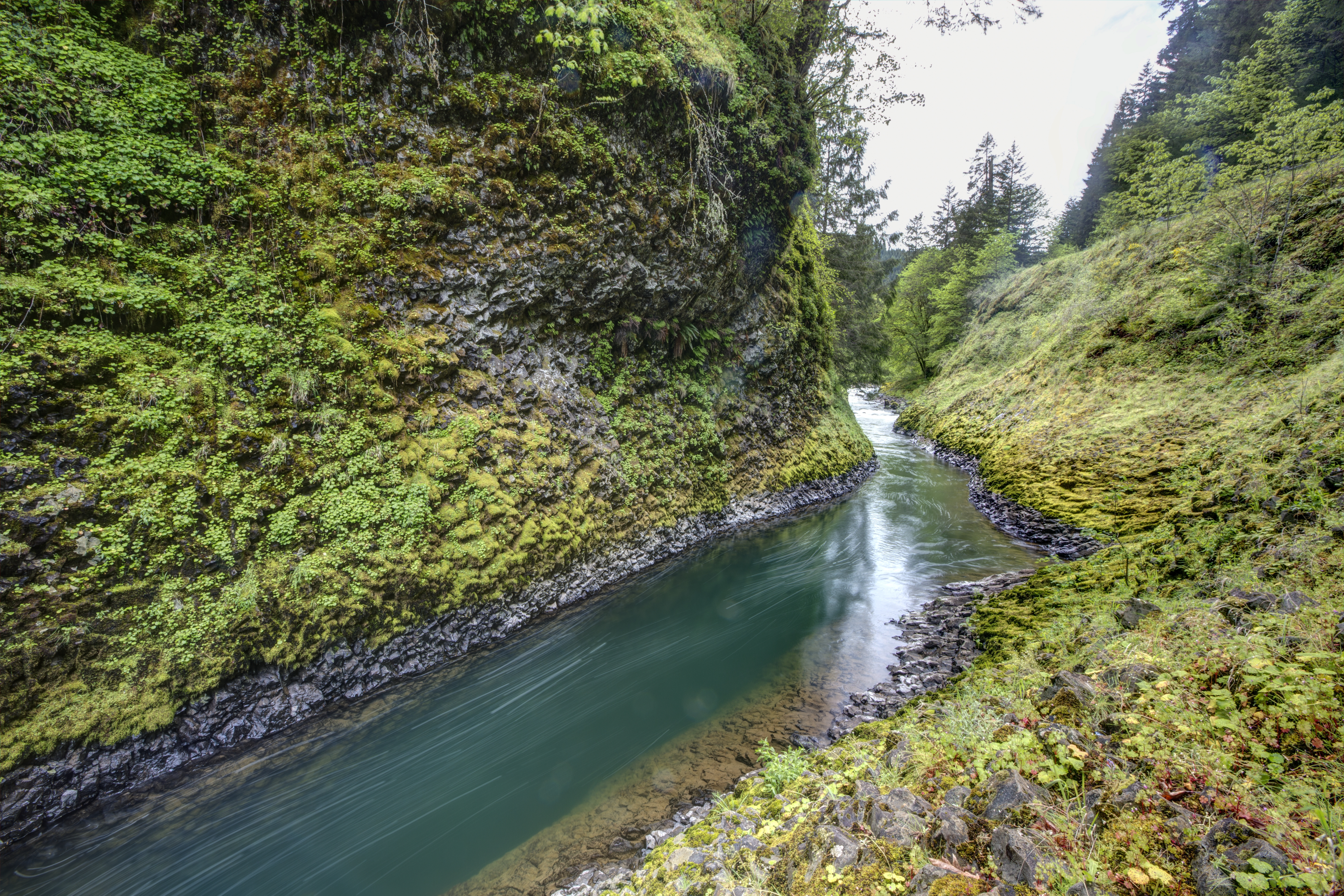
The Molalla River

The Northern Molala principally were concentrated in the Molalla River watershed. The only recorded Northern Molala autonym is lá•ti•wi, used to mean both "Molala person" and "Molala people".

=== Diet ===
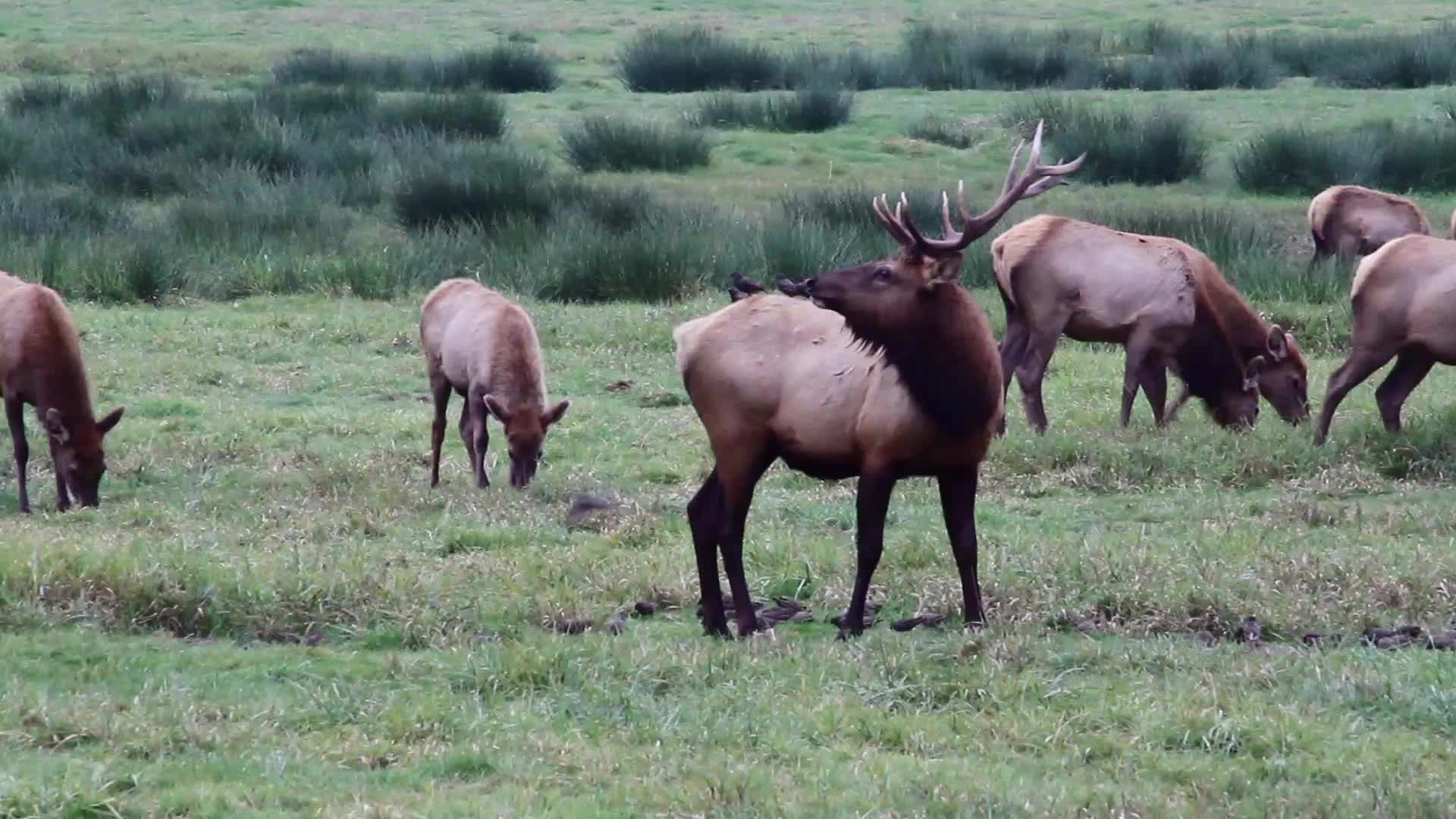
Roosevelt Elk

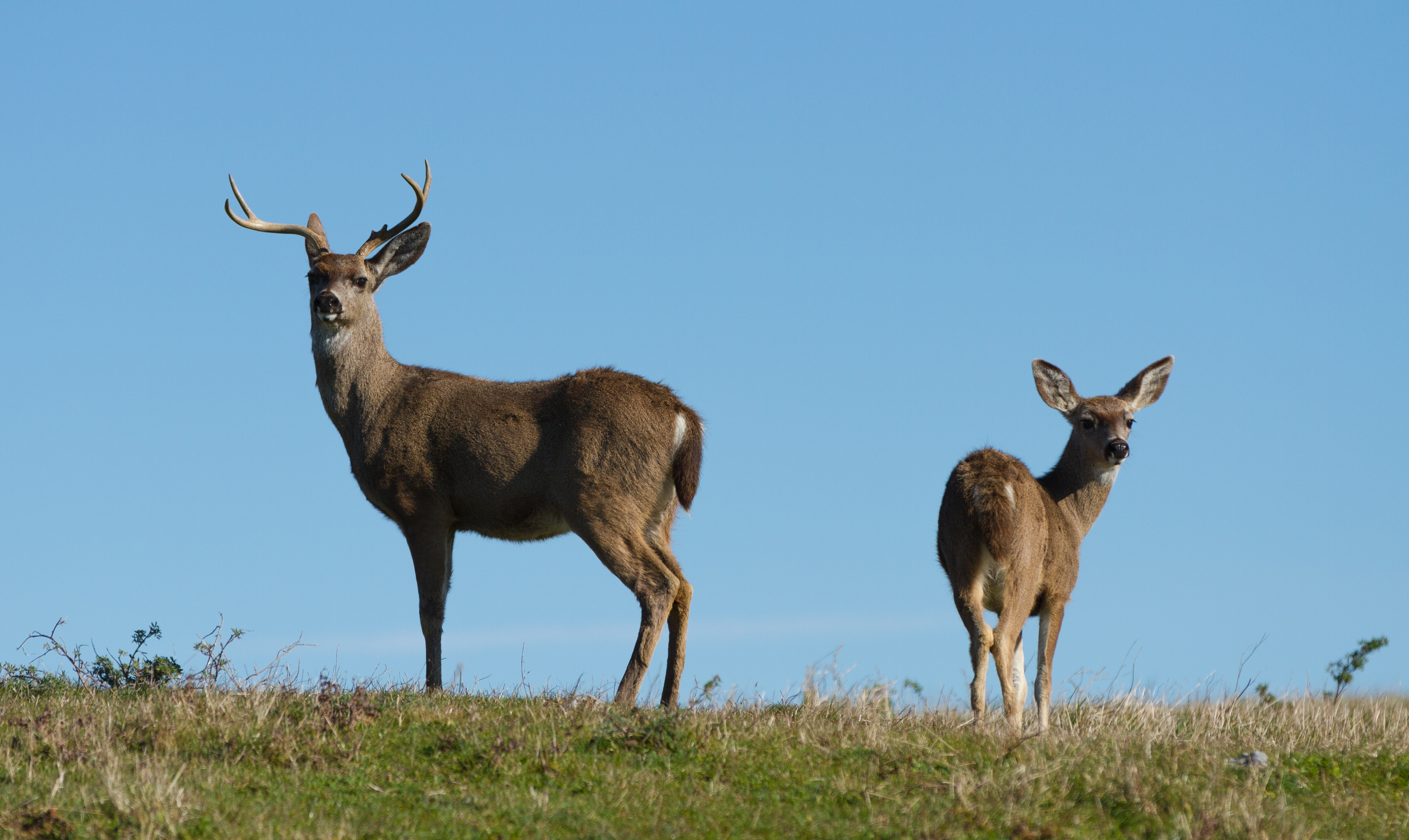
Columbian Black-Deer

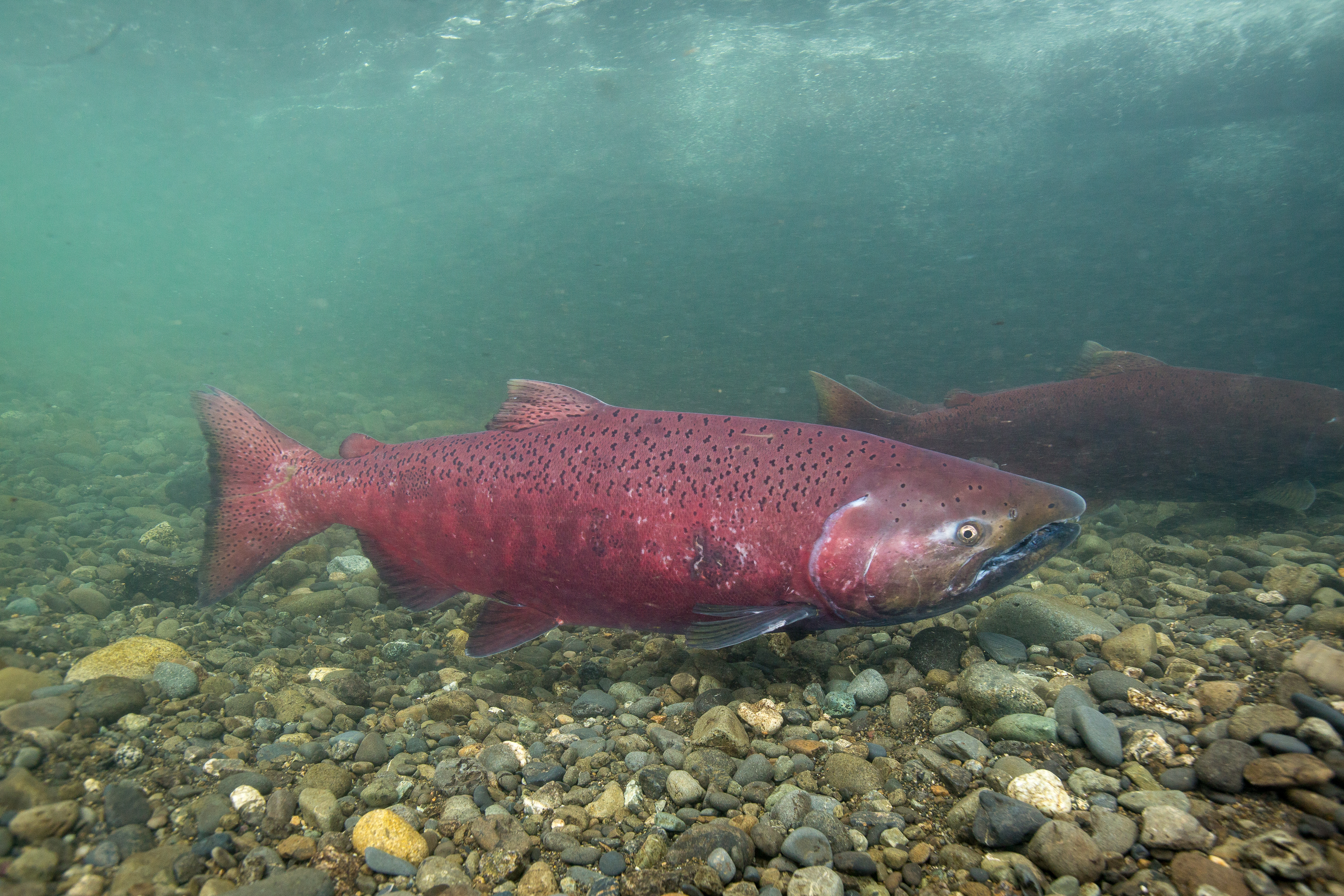
Chinook Salmon

Roosevelt elk and Black-tailed deer were "economically the most important resource exploited" by the Molala peoples. While they employed pitfalls and snares, most big game hunting was accomplished by bow and arrow. Hunting dogs were trained to pursue game as well. Klamath informants told Spier that Molala dogs were small, "with short legs, the hind legs crooked. They were short-haired, had erect ears, short faces, with sometimes black marks on the upper eyelids..." A number of other animals were hunted, not for sustenance but for feathers or fur, such as the bald eagle, coyotes, and bobcats. Steelhead and Chinook salmon were captured by either basket traps or harpoons. Once gathered the meat was dried and stored for future consumption.

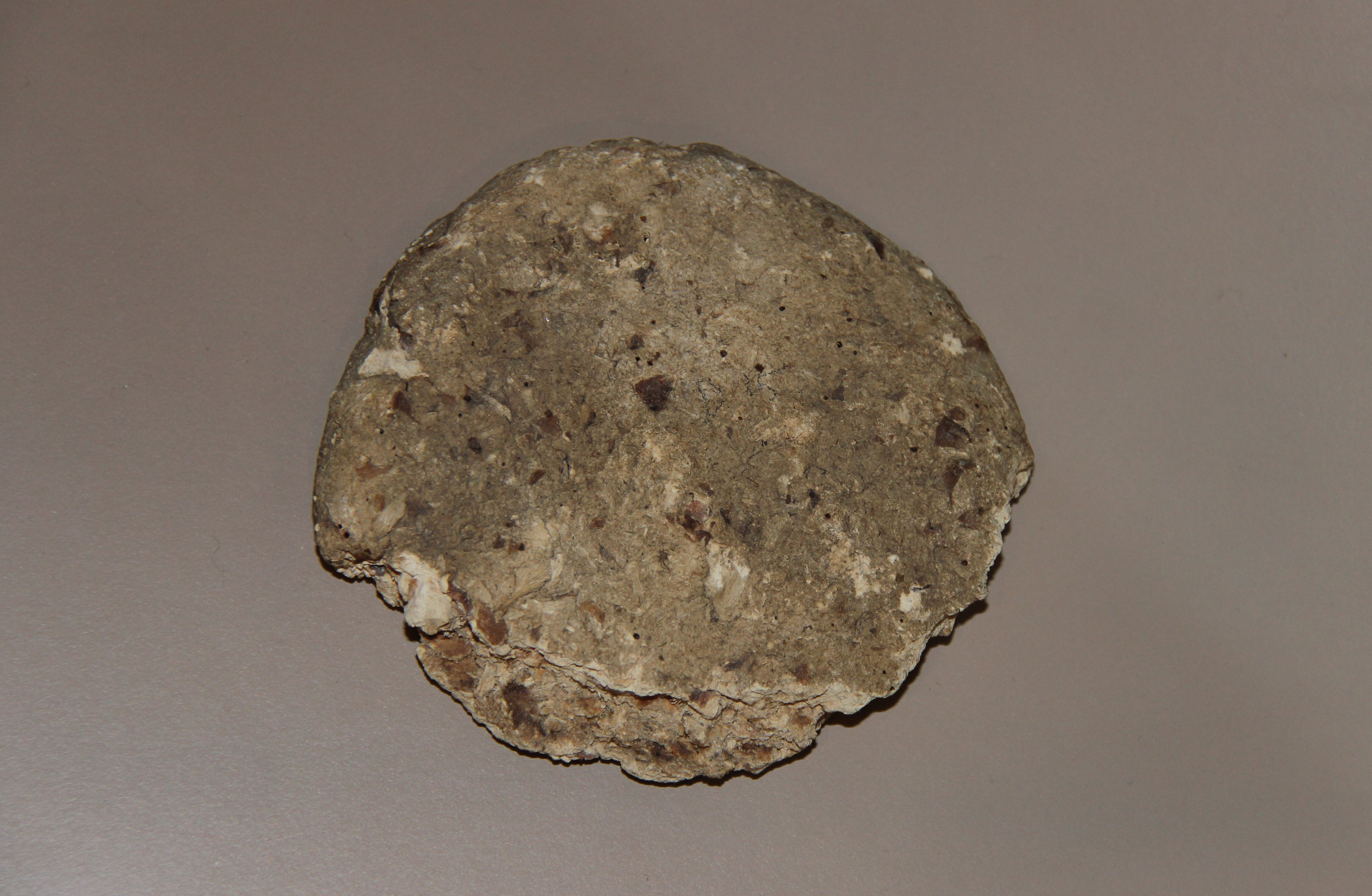
A bread made from camas bulbs.

A number of plant resources were utilized seasonally by the Molala. In their western territories were prairies of camas bulbs, an important caloric source. Found in the drier prairies, hazelnuts and tarweed seeds were gathered in the summer and autumn. Camas bulbs were baked in earth ovens, dried, blended with hazelnuts, and stored in sacks. To east, in the higher elevations of the Cascades, Mountain Huckleberries were collected in the late summer; alongside the Cascade Blueberry, the Oval-leaf Huckleberry, and the Red Huckleberry. After being gathered huckleberries would be dried.

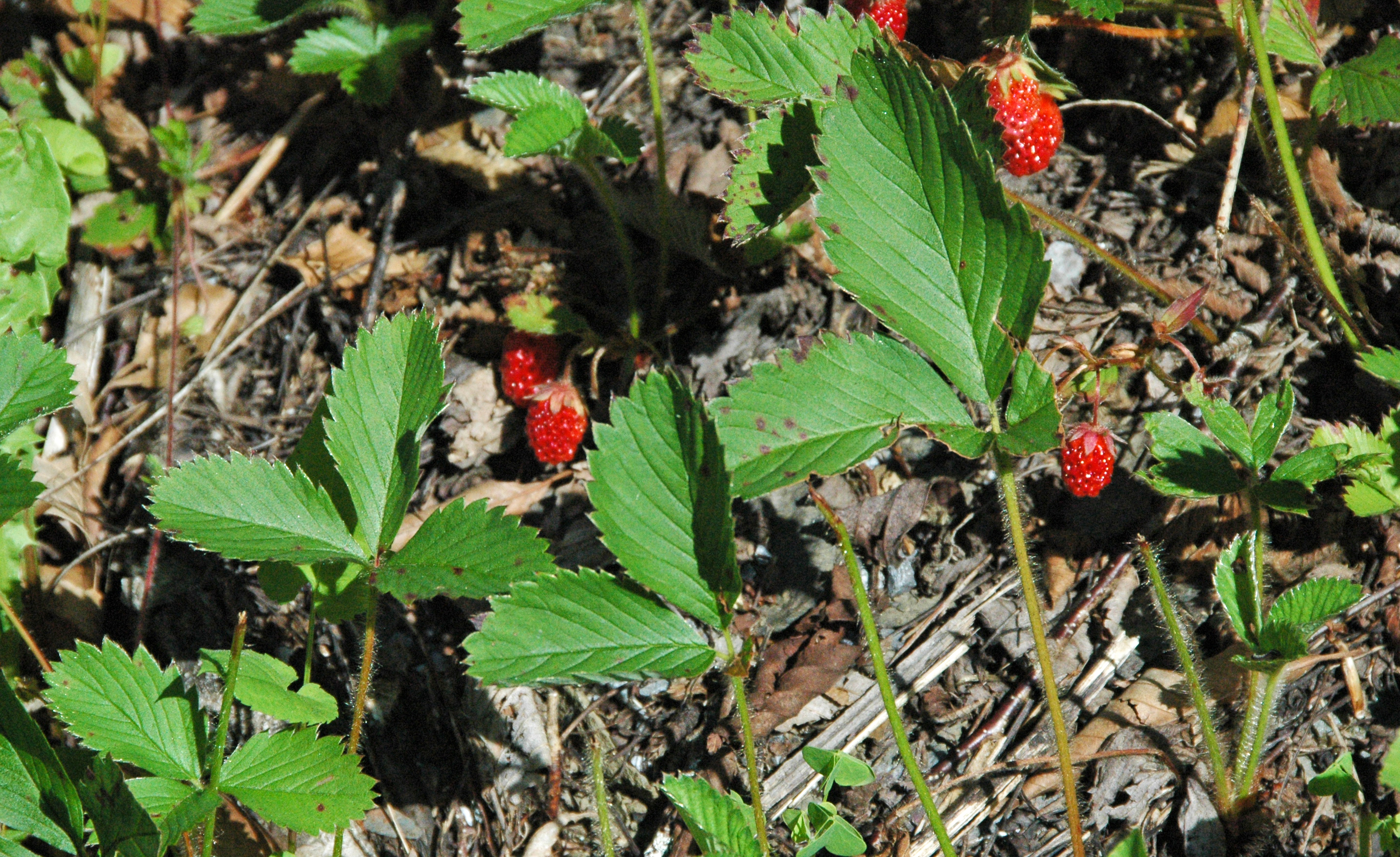
Wild Strawberries

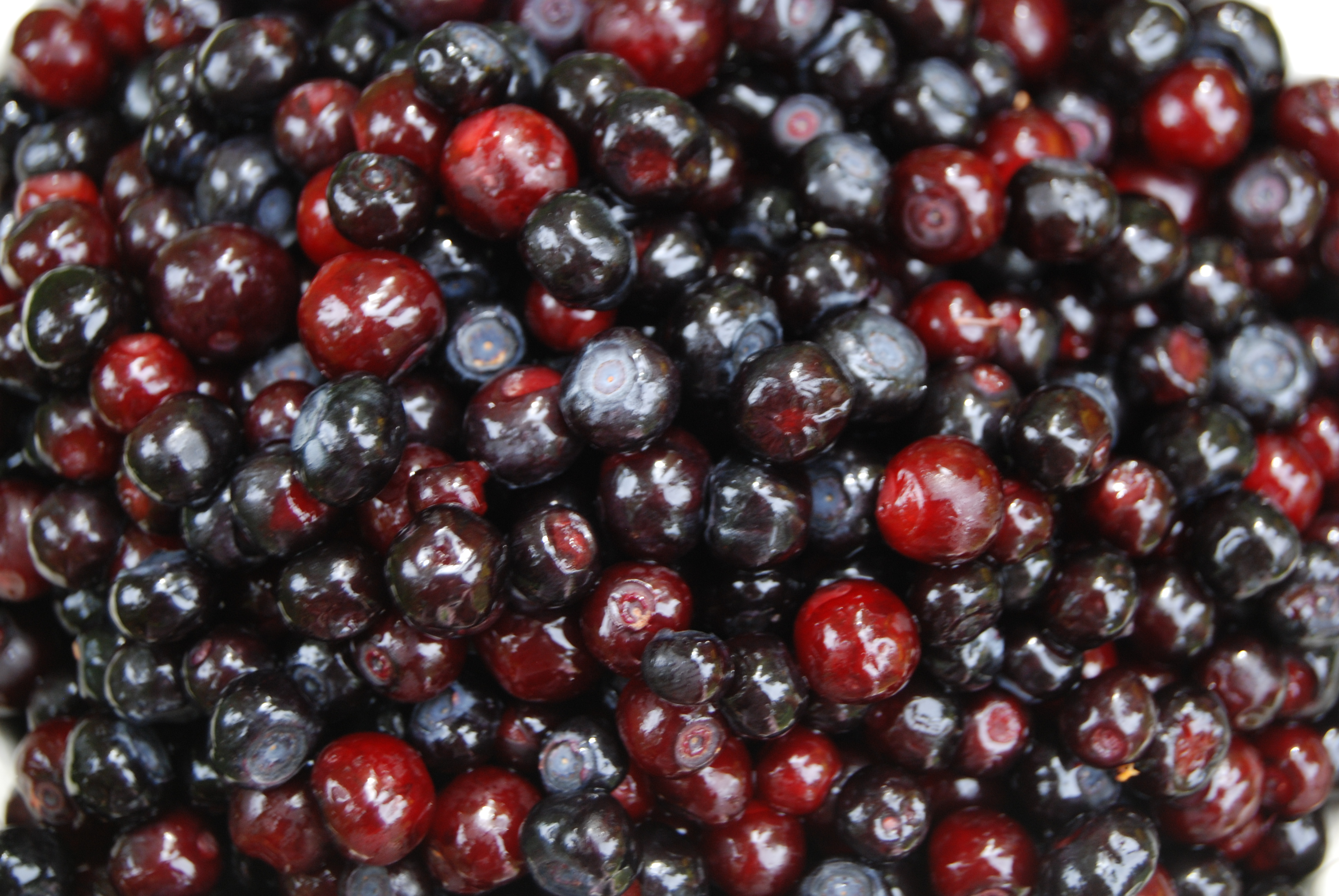
Mountain Huckleberries

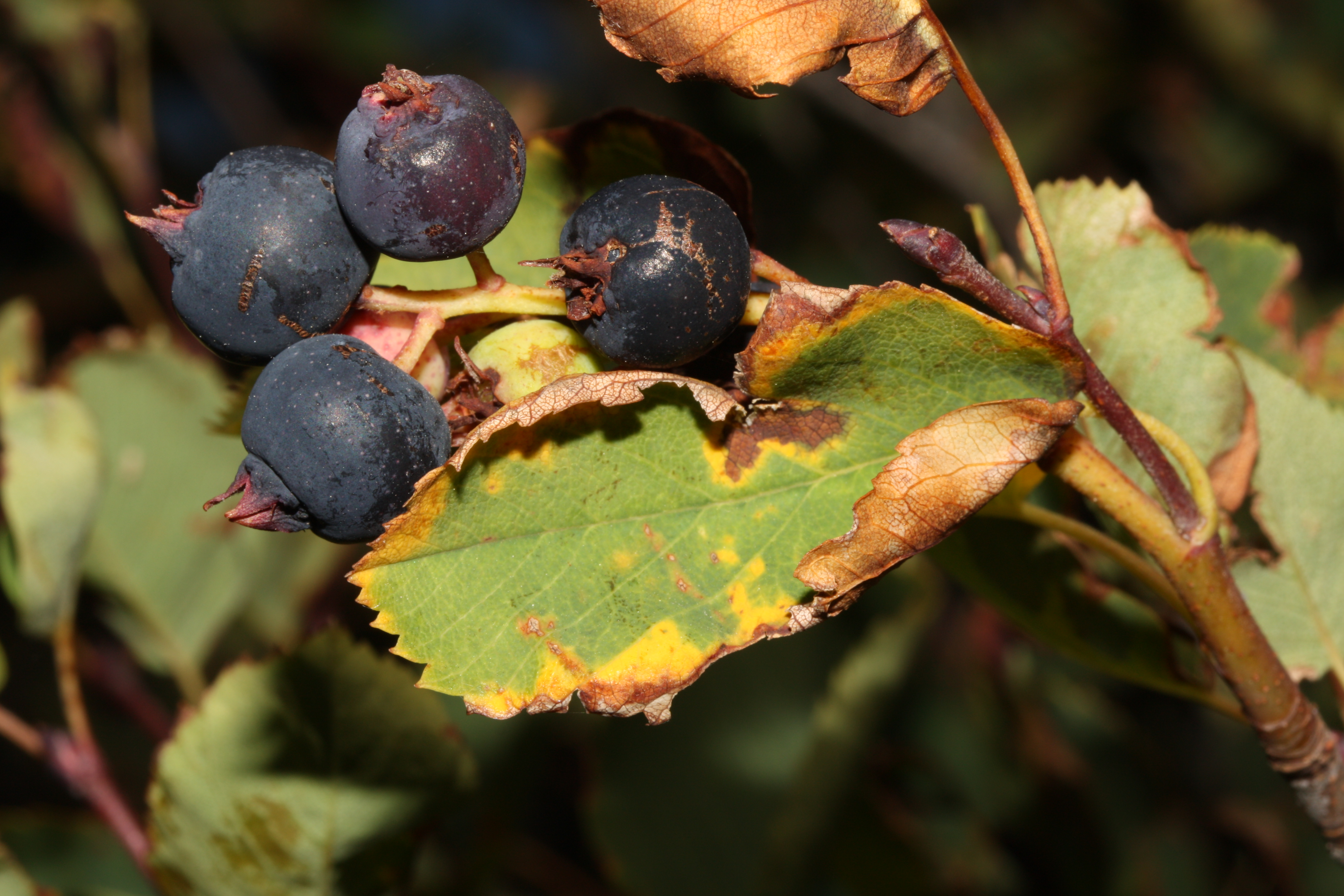
Pacific Serviceberries

Located nearby Crater Lake, Huckleberry Mountain was the "single-most important berry-gathering area" for the Southern Molala and Klamath. Edible berries in the vicinity include the Littleleaf Huckleberry, Western Blueberry, Manzanita Berry, Wild Strawberry, Black Twinberry, Evergreen Blackberry, Blackcap Raspberry, Thimbleberry, Blue Elderberry, Red Elderberry, Wax Currant, and Rose hips from the local Wild Rose.

=== Manufacturerd items ===
Molala made composite bows from Pacific Yew and sinew.

== Language ==
The Molala language is extinct. Currently it is included among the Plateau Penutian language family, with Klamath and Sahaptin being considered the closest related.

== Neighoring societies ==
Prior to the introduction of horses in the 1820s-1830s, Molala contact with their neighbors appears to have been slight. They resided between several divergent cultural areas which were shaped by distinct ecological regions. Among the bordering peoples were the Kalapuya to west in the Willamette Valley, the Upper Chinookans to north on the Columbia River, and the Klamath to the southeast.

Upper Chinookan crafted canoes were particularly sought after by the Northern Molala. Head flattening was practiced to bolster the desirability of their women to the Chinookans. While some intermarriage with Kalapuyans was reported, the Molala attacked them for slaves. The Klamath people were intimately close to the Molala, enough to "suggest contact between these two groups throughout the entire area of Molala occupation." The Southern Molala exchanged buckskins in return for Klamath crafted beads and wocus seeds.

Groups of armed men called the haylúnci, "upstreamers", occasionally attacked Molala settlements for slaves These slavers were from the Cayuse and Nez Perce peoples. Gatschet reported the last known Cayuse raid occurred in the late 1820s. A Molala man of social prominence was killed in the attack. A Clackamas man served as an intermediary between the Molala and the Cayuse raiders to arrange for a battle. In the ensuing two day skirmish the Molalas considered themselves victorious.

== Mythology ==
Only a few Molala myths remain extant, recorded by ethnographers in the late 19th and early 20th centuries. Boas recounts a story told by the Molala of the world once being entirely covered in water. As the world ocean receded, Mount Hood became exposed first and latter the Willamette Valley.

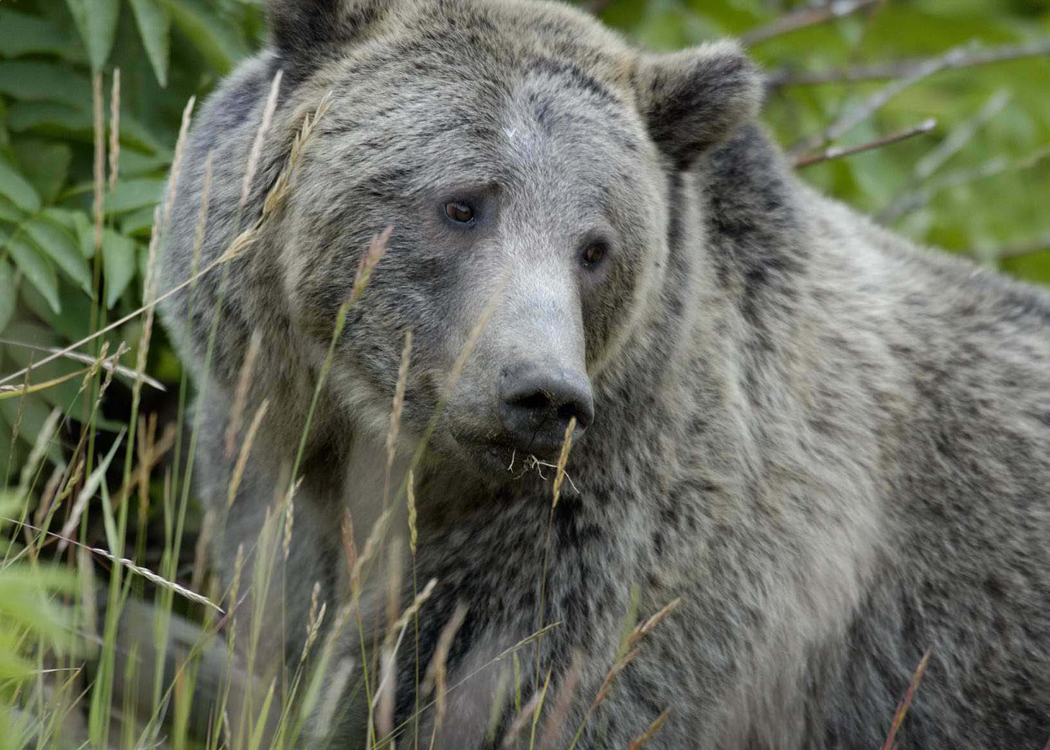
Grizzly Bear

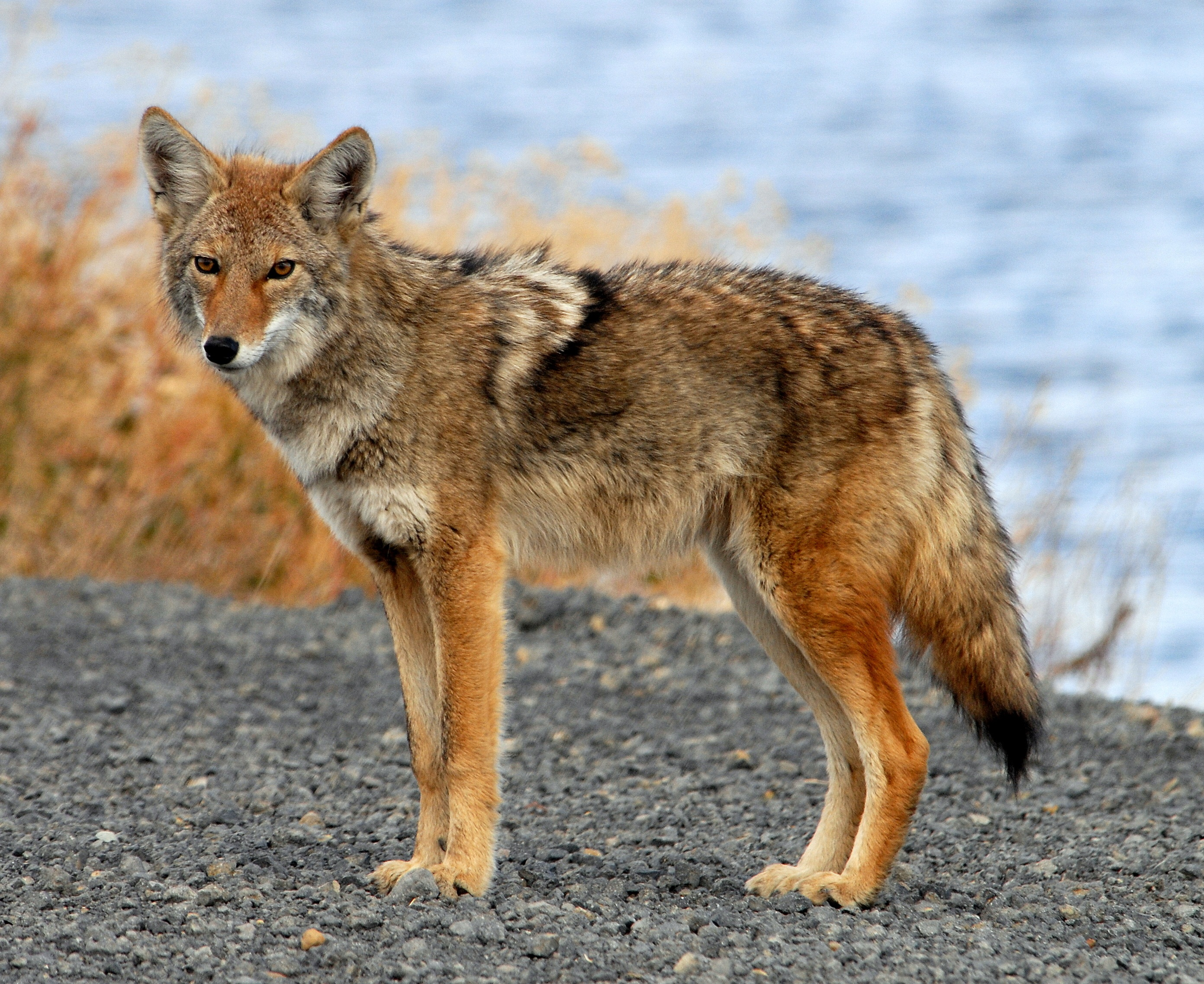
Coyote

A prominent story is the creation of the Molala people, told by Stephen Savage to Gatschet in 1877. One day near Mount Hood, Coyote encountered Grizzly Bear, who challenged them to a duel. Rather than combat, Coyotes suggests on seeing who could eat the most hot stones. However, instead of ingesting rocks, Coyote ate wild strawberries. After eating five hot stones Grizzly Bear died and Coyote studied the corpse:

He skinned Grizzly, then began cutting him up; he scattered his body in little pieces all over. Then to the Molala country he threw the heart. He said, "Now the Molala will be good hunters: they will all be good men, thinking and studying about hunting deer. They will think all the time they are on a hunt."

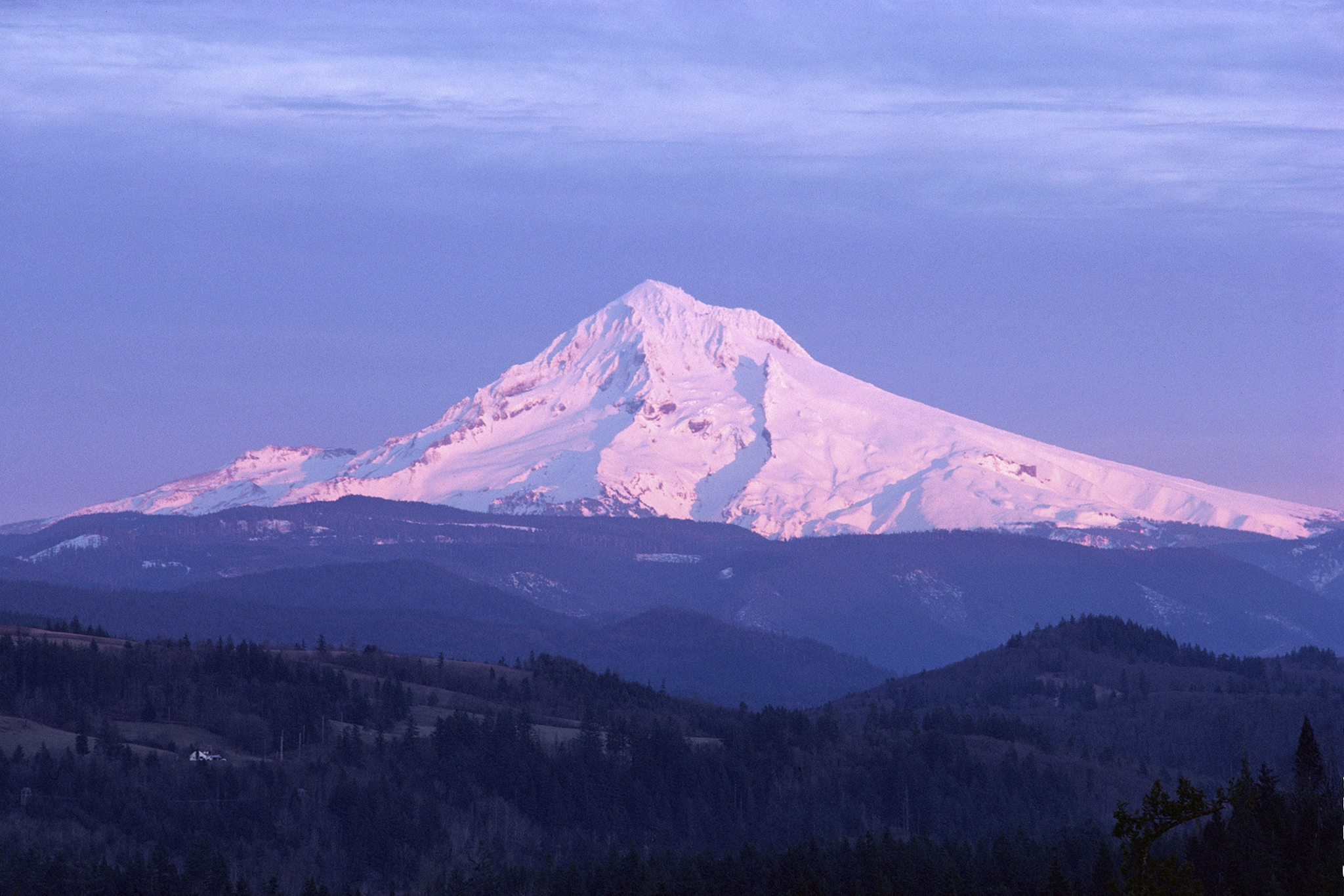
The Molala believed they were created by Coyote from atop Mount Hood.

== History ==
=== Tensions with settlers ===
In late March 1848, settlers burnt down a Molala headman's household who was out hunting. William T'Vault admonished the violence for creating tension with the natives of the Willamette Valley. The violence was in retaliation for a visiting Klamath having stolen "some article of trifling value..."

During the Spring 1848, eighty Klamath people arrived in contemporary Clackamas county. This occurred during the ongoing Cayuse War, which provoked settler paranoia of indigenous violence. The Klamath were asked to leave, but they refused. Local Molala headman Crooked Finger protected the right for Klamath to reside among their Molala relatives. After a series of thefts, an armed group of settlers killed several Klamath and forced them to flee eastwards into the Cascade Mountains. One late 19th century account misremembered the violence as between settlers and Molala, rather than the Klamath.

During June 1848 a group of Molala or Klamath were suspected of stealing clothing and a horse. A militia was formed and pursued the group of natives, who abandoned the settler's horse and two horses of their own.

=== Treaty negotiations ===
In 1850 Anson Dart was appointed Oregon Superintendent of Indian Affairs. Federal orders were for the various native peoples residing west of Cascades to be forcibly relocated to reservations established to the east of the mountains. Dart started negotiations with the various Willamette Valley natives in Spring 1851 at Champoeg. He was unable to get anyone to agree to removal into Eastern Oregon. The general lack of knowledge of available food resources in the unfamiliar region caused much of the protest.

Going against his initial orders, Dart eventually acquiesced to establishing reservations in the Willamette Valley. Among the Treaties drafted by Dart were two for the Molala. In exchange for yielding much of their territory, on 6 May, the Northern Molala agreed to payments of goods, cash, and a reservation centered on the Molalla River eastwards to the Cascades. On the following day the Upper Santiam Molala agreed to similar terms, with a reservation going from Mt. Jefferson westward to the Santiam River. There were 121 or 123 Molalas total between the two groups.

Because these agreements allowed for the Kalapuyans and Molala to retain portions of the Willamette Valley, settlers protested the Dart Treaties. Their complaints reached the US Congress, which subsequently refused to approve the Treaties. Dart resigned in consequence, leaving the issue of Molala sovereignty unresolved.

Joel Palmer was the next Superintendent who negotiated a series of Treaties with Oregon Natives that were largely approved by the Federal Government. At Dayton in January 1855 he oversaw a series of negotiations that resulted in the Willamette Valley Treaty. Among others, the Northern and Upper Santiam Molala agreed to abandon the Willamette Valley in favor of a location selected by Palmer. The agreement was ratified by Congress in March 1855.

=== Reservation ===
In Autumn 1855 "the last Indian scare of any importance" in the Willamette Valley occurred. Fears arose that a force of Klamath were incoming to sack settler homesteads. After a day however a group of Molalas informed the fearful settlers no conflict with the Klamath was imminent.

During the winter of 1855-1856 the Northern Molala and Upper Santiam Molala were forced to relocate to the newly established Grand Ronde Reservation. In 1889 there were reportedly 31 Molalas residing on the Grand Ronde Reservation.

In 1857, settlers located around Molalla complained about the nearby Grand Ronde Reservation:

"[Natives are] constantly annoying the settlers by passing to and fro over our premises, leaving fences down, and occasionally committing petit larcenies...The fact is, these Indians are a nuisance..."

Reportedly in November 1870 an outbreak of smallpox spread among the Molala residing in Clackamas County.

To avoid the settler violence, some Southern Molala moved onto the Klamath Reservation during the mid-19th century. In April 1870, a Molala resident of the Klamath Reservation named Spike attempted to kill three people, succeeding in murdering one Klamath. He was captured and presented to Agency officials. After a short trial Spike was executed by hanging. In 1881 there 55 Molalas living among the Klamath.

At the opening ceremonies of the 1915 Siletz Fair, a Molala headman named John Williams delivered an address that was described by the Lincoln County Leader as "eloquent, patriotic and impressive." The newspaper continued to detail Williams' speech:

"He was proud of his Indian blood and urged his people to stand by their race. Fifty years of education and training has made the Indians capable of citizenship. He thought the future was bright with hope for the Indians. He urged his people to seize the opportunities that surround them and make the most of them."

In September 1919 Williams led a group of 60 Siletz residents to Independence. There, they were joined by 50 Grand Ronde members, and the group participated in the annual hop harvest.

Henry Yelkes was one of the last Molala yaʔqánt. He maintained a homestead on the Northern fork of the Molalla River and was held in high regard by neighboring settlers. In September 1913, during festivities in the town of Molalla, Yelkes was the guest of honor. The event was held to celebrate the opening of passenger rail service by the Portland, Eugene & Eastern Railway Company. Before the assembled crowds, the otherwise reserved Yelkes spoke:

"I am the last of the Molalla Indians. They named this place from our tribe. When I was a boy there were many of my people here Now they are all gone. My hat of deerskin and flicker feathers belonged to my grandfather. But he and the old times are gone."

In September 1913 Yelkes was found dead with head injuries. Two months later in November, a Clackamas County grand jury issued a warrant for Harry Clark, a mixed race native. The coroner upon examination of Yelkes' body felt he died from alcohol. In the subsequent trial the jury concluded there was a lack of evidence tying Clark to the death of Yelkes. Clark was released in January 1914.

== Legacy ==
A private collection of Molala artifacts located in Mt Angel in 1931 included 535 flint arrowheads, an 8-inch tomahawk head, and an assortment of beadwork.

As of 2008, Molala produced beaded moccasins and woven baskets were on display at the British Museum, the Burke and Whatcom Museums of Washington, and the Museum of the Oregon Territory of Oregon City, Oregon.

== Notable Molala ==
- Molala Kate Chantal (c. 1844–1938), ethnographic informant and among the last speakers of Molala
- Victoria Wishikin Howard (c. 1865–1930), storyteller

== Bibliography ==
=== Articles ===
- Coan, C. F. (1921). "The First Stage of the Federal Indian Policy in the Pacific Northwest, 1849-1852". The Quarterly of the Oregon Historical Society. 22 (1). Portland, OR: Oregon Historical Society: 46–89. ISSN 2153-1706. JSTOR 20610175.
- Deur, Douglas (2002a). "A Most Sacred Place: The Significance of Crater Lake among the Indians of Southern Oregon". Oregon Historical Quarterly. 103 (1): 18–49. ISSN 0030-4727. JSTOR 20615207.
- Gatschet, Albert S. (1877a). "Indian Languages of the Pacific States and Territories". Magazine of American History. 1 (3): 145–166 – via Google Books.
- Jacobs, Meville (1959). Voegelin, Charles F. (ed.). "Clackamas Chinook Texts Part 2". International Journal of American Linguistics. 25 (2). Indiana University – via Project MUSE.
- Johnson, Oscar (1999). "The Molalla: a nation of good hunters". Smoke Signals. Confederated Tribes of the Grand Ronde Community of Oregon. Archived from the original on 2020-01-16.
- MacKey, Harold (1972). "New Light on the Molala Indians". Oregon Historical Quarterly. 73 (1): 63–65. JSTOR 20613280.
- Minto, John (1903). "Minto Pass: Its History, and an Indian Tradition". The Quarterly of the Oregon Historical Society. 4 (3): 241–250. JSTOR 20609580.
- Murdock, George (1938). "'Notes on the Tenino, Molala, and Paiute of Oregon' in Tribal Distribution in Eastern Oregon and Adjacent Regions". American Anthropologist. 40 (3): 395–402. JSTOR 662038.
- Spores, Ronald (1993). "Too Small a Place: The Removal of the Willamette Valley Indians, 1850-1856". American Indian Quarterly. 17 (2): 171–191. doi:10.2307/1185526. ISSN 0095-182X. JSTOR 1185526.
- Rigsby, Bruce (Spring 1969). Sprague, Roderick; Goss, James A. (eds.). "The Waiilatpuan Problem: More on Cayuse-Molala Relatability". Journal of Northwest Anthropology. 3 (2): 68–146 – via Google Books.
- Teit, James H. (1928). Boas, Franz (ed.). "The Middle Columbia Salish". University of Washington Publications in Anthropology. 2 (4). Seattle, WA: University of Washington Press: 83–128 – via University of Washington.

=== Books ===
- Berreman, Joel V. (1937). Spier, Leslie (ed.). Tribal Distribution in Oregon. Memoirs of American Anthropological Association. Menasha, WI: American Anthropological Association. Archived from the original on 2020-07-10.
- Chapman, Judith S.; Ray, Lois E. H. (2008). Molalla. Images of America. Arcadia Publishing. ISBN 978-0-7385-5613-0.
- Deur, Douglas (2002b). Huckleberry Mountain Traditional-Use Study. Archived (PDF) from the original on 2020-09-29.
- Gatschet, Albert S. (1890). The Klamath Indians of Southwestern Oregon. Contributions to North American Ethnology. Vol. 2, Part I. Washington, D.C.: United States Government Printing Office. ISBN 978-0-665-52744-9.
- Hale, Horatio (1846). Ethnography and Philology. Philadelphia: C. Sherman.
- McClane, James (1889). "Report of Grande Ronde Agency". Eighty-Fifth Annual Report of the Commissioner of Indian Affairs to the Secretary of the Interior. Washington D.C.: Government Printing Office. pp. 269–270.
- Minor, Rick; Pecor, Aubrey (1977). Cultural Resource Overview of Willamette National Forest, Western Oregon. University of Oregon Anthropological Papers. Eugene, OR: University of Oregon. Archived from the original on 2024-02-18.
- Powell, John Wesley (1891). Indian Linguistic Families of America: North of Mexico. Washington, D. C.: U.S. Government Printing Office. ISBN 978-0-598-28444-0.
- Ramsey, Jarold, ed. (1977). Coyote was going there: Indian literature of the Oregon country. Seattle & London: University of Washington Press. ISBN 978-0-295-95441-7.
- Spier, Leslie (1930), Kroeber, Alfred L.; Lowie, Robert (eds.), Klamath Ethnography, Berkeley: University of California Press
- Zenk, Henry B.; Rigsby, Bruce (1998). "Molala". In Sturtevant, William C. (ed.). Plateau. Handbook of North American Indians. Vol. 12. Washington D.C.: United States Government Printing Office. pp. 439–445.

=== Manuscripts ===
- Boas, Franz (1890). [Molala fieldnotes]. Manuscript No. 999. Washington D.C.: National Anthropological Archives.
- Gatschet, Albert S. (1877b). [Three Molale texts with interlinear English translations, from informant Stephen Savage, Grande Ronde Reserve, Oreg., Dec. 1877. Incl.: "Marriage Ceremonies"; "Myth or the Coyote"; and, "Molale tribe raided by the Cayuse". Texts copied by Gatschet.] Manuscript No. 998. Washington D.C.: National Anthropological Archives.
- Jacobs, Melville (1936). [Tualatin and Santiam Kalapuyan linguistic and ethnographic notes.]. University of Washington.

=== Maps ===
- Gibbs, George; Starling, Edward A. (May 1851). Sketch of the Wallamette Valley, showing the purchases and reservations made by the Board of Commissioners, appointed to treat with the Indians of Oregon. April and May 1851. Records of the Bureau of Indian Affairs. Washington, D.C.: Bureau of Indian Affairs.

=== Newspapers ===
- Adams, Williams L., ed. (1857-09-26). "[Letter from Molalla, September 23, 1857.]". Oregon Argus. Oregon City, OR. p. 2.
- Brown, Mart V., ed. (1870-11-25). "State News". States Rights Democrat. Albany, OR. p. 2.
- Clarke, Samuel A., ed. (1870-04-15). "An Indian Tragedy". Weekly Oregon Statesman. Salem, OR. p. 2.
- Collins, Robert E., ed. (1914-09-13). "Newport". Lincoln County Reader. Toledo, OR. p. 1.
- Curry, George L., ed. (1848-06-24). "Indian Depredations, ETC". Oregon Free Press. Vol. 1, no. 12. Oregon City, OR. p. 2.
- Hendricks, R. J., ed. (1886-11-05). "Mill Creek Falls". Statesman Journal. Vol. 19, no. 189. Salem, OR. p. 2.
- Hendricks, R. J., ed. (1915-04-08). "Molalla". Statesman Journal. Salem, OR. p. 6.
- Hunsacker, Thomas H. (1917-03-03). Shelton, J. E. (ed.). "A Tale of Pioneer Days". The Eugene Guard. Vol. 52, no. 63. Eugene, OR. p. 8.
- Jackson, Sam, ed. (10 Aug 1913a). "Last of Molallas, a contented farmer". The Oregon Daily Journal. Vol. 10, no. 18. Portland, OR. p. 7.
- Jackson, Sam, ed. (21 Sep 1913b). "New 'Iron Horse' too much for 'Old Buck,' Pioneer of Molalla". The Oregon Daily Journal. Vol. 10, no. 24. Portland, OR. p. 10.
- Jackson, Sam, ed. (23 Nov 1913c). "Harry Clark held for death of Indian Henry". The Oregon Daily Journal. Vol. 10, no. 33. Portland, OR. p. 1.
- Jackson, Sam, ed. (1914-01-16). ""Indian Harry" is found not guilty". The Oregon Daily Journal. Vol. 12, no. 269. Portland, OR. p. 2.
- Jackson, Sam, ed. (1919-09-04). "Heap Big Chief Lead Braves to Hop Yards". The Oregon Daily Journal. Vol. 18, no. 154. Portland, OR. p. 6.
- Putnam, George, ed. (1931-08-18). "Indian Relics Kronberg Home Are Fine Show". The Capital Journal. Salem, OR. p. 4.
- Schnebly, D. J., ed. (1851-05-15). "Treaties 5 and 6". Oregon Spectator. Vol. 5. Oregon City, OR. p. 2.
- T'Vault, William G., ed. (1848-03-23). "Willamette Indian Relations". Oregon Spectator. Vol. 3. Oregon City, OR. p. 2.
- Taber, Graham P., ed. (1913-09-24). "Chief Henry Yelkis is believed murdered". The Capital Journal. Salem, OR. p. 4.

=== Theses ===
- Pharris, Nicholas J. (2006). Winuunsi Tm Talapaas: A Grammar of the Molalla Language (Thesis). Ann Arbor, MI: University of Michigan. hdl:2027.42/125859.
- Rigsby, Bruce (1965). Linguistic relations in the Southern Plateau. Eugene, OR: University of Oregon.

=== Websites ===
- CTSI. "The Early Treaty Making Period of 1851". www.ctsi.nsn.us. Confederated Tribes of Siletz Indians. Archived from the original on 2023-11-30.
- Jette, Melinda (2014). "Kalapuya Treaty of 1855". www.oregonencyclopedia.org. Oregon Historical Society. Archived from the original on 2023-12-13.
- Lewis, David G. (2014). "Willamette Valley Treaties". Oregon Encyclopedia. Oregon Historical Society. Archived from the original on 2023-11-10.
- Lewis, David G. (December 30, 2017). "The Battle of Abiqua, Second Battle of the Willamette Valley". Ethnohistory Research, LLC.
- NLA (2005). "Molale (Molalla)". Native Languages of the Americas. Archived from the original on 2023-01-22.
- Turner, Kenan (2017-02-24). "Huckleberry Mountain Serves Indigenous for Thousands of Years". Jefferson Public Radio. Archived from the original on 2020-10-31.
