= Henline Mountain =

Mountain peak in Oregon, United States

- Location within Oregon

Highest point
- Elevation: 4,644 ft (1,415 m)
- Coordinates: 44°51′51″N 122°19′14″W

Geography
- Location: Marion County
- Parent range: Cascades
- Topo map: TopoZone

Geology
- Mountain type: Mountain

Climbing
- Easiest route: Trail

Henline Mountain is a mountain located in the Opal Creek Wilderness in the Willamette National Forest. The mountain lies about 10 miles northeast of the town of Mill City. Henline Mountain stands 4,644 ft above sea level (1,415 m). The name of the mountain comes from a 19th-century settler. The mountain is most well known for the hike up the mountain which has views of Mt. Jefferson. Henline Mountain shares its name with nearby Henline Falls.
