= Middle Pyramid (Oregon) =

- Location within Oregon

Highest point
- Elevation: 5,618 ft (1,712 m)
- Coordinates: 44°30′00″N 122°04′59″W

Geography
- Location: Linn County
- Parent range: Cascade Mountain Range
- Topo map: TopoZone

Geology
- Mountain type: Mountain

Climbing
- Easiest route: Trail

Middle Pyramid is a mountain in Linn County, Oregon.

Middle Pyramid is one of three different mountains in the area. There is South Pyramid, Middle Pyramid, and North Pyramid. Middle Pyramid is best known for the hike to the top. The summit has views of the Cascade Mountain Range. The mountain is located in the Willamette National Forest. The mountain stands 5,618 ft above sea level (1,712 m).
