= Cleveland Rock =

Cleveland Rock may refer to:

- Snow Peak (Oregon), a summit in the Oregon Cascades
- Bay of Isles#Charting and naming of features, an Antarctic island named in 1980 for Benjamin D. Cleveland
