= Crescent Mountain (Oregon) =

Mountain in Oregon, United States

- Location within Oregon

Highest point
- Elevation: 5,750 ft (1,750 m)
- Coordinates: 44°26′48″N 122°05′35″W

Geography
- Location: Linn County
- Parent range: Cascades
- Topo map: TopoZone

Geology
- Mountain type: Volcano
- Volcanic arc: Cascade Volcanic Arc, Western Cascades
- Last eruption: Unknown

Climbing
- Easiest route: Trail

Crescent Mountain is a mountain in Linn County, Oregon. It is located near the junction of U.S 20 and Highway 22. The mountain lies in the Willamette National Forest. The mountain is best known for its hike that leads to the top of the mountain. The top provides views of nearby mountains such as Mt. Jefferson.
