= Bachelor Mountain (Oregon) =

Mountain in Linn County, Oregon, U.S

- Location within Oregon

Highest point
- Elevation: 5,953 ft (1,814 m)
- Coordinates: 44°37′44″N 122°00′43″W

Geography
- Location: Linn County
- Parent range: Cascades
- Topo map: TopoZone

Geology
- Mountain type: Mountain

Climbing
- Easiest route: Trail

Bachelor Mountain is a mountain located in Linn County, Oregon.

Bachelor Mountain is in the Willamette National Forest and stands 5,953 ft above sea level (1,814 m). It is located next to Coffin Mountain. Bachelor Mountain is best known for having a trail to hike to the top. Like Coffin Mountain, it has views of the Cascade Mountain Range. The mountain used to have a fire lookout.
