= Henline Falls =

Waterfall in the Opal Creek Wilderness in Oregon

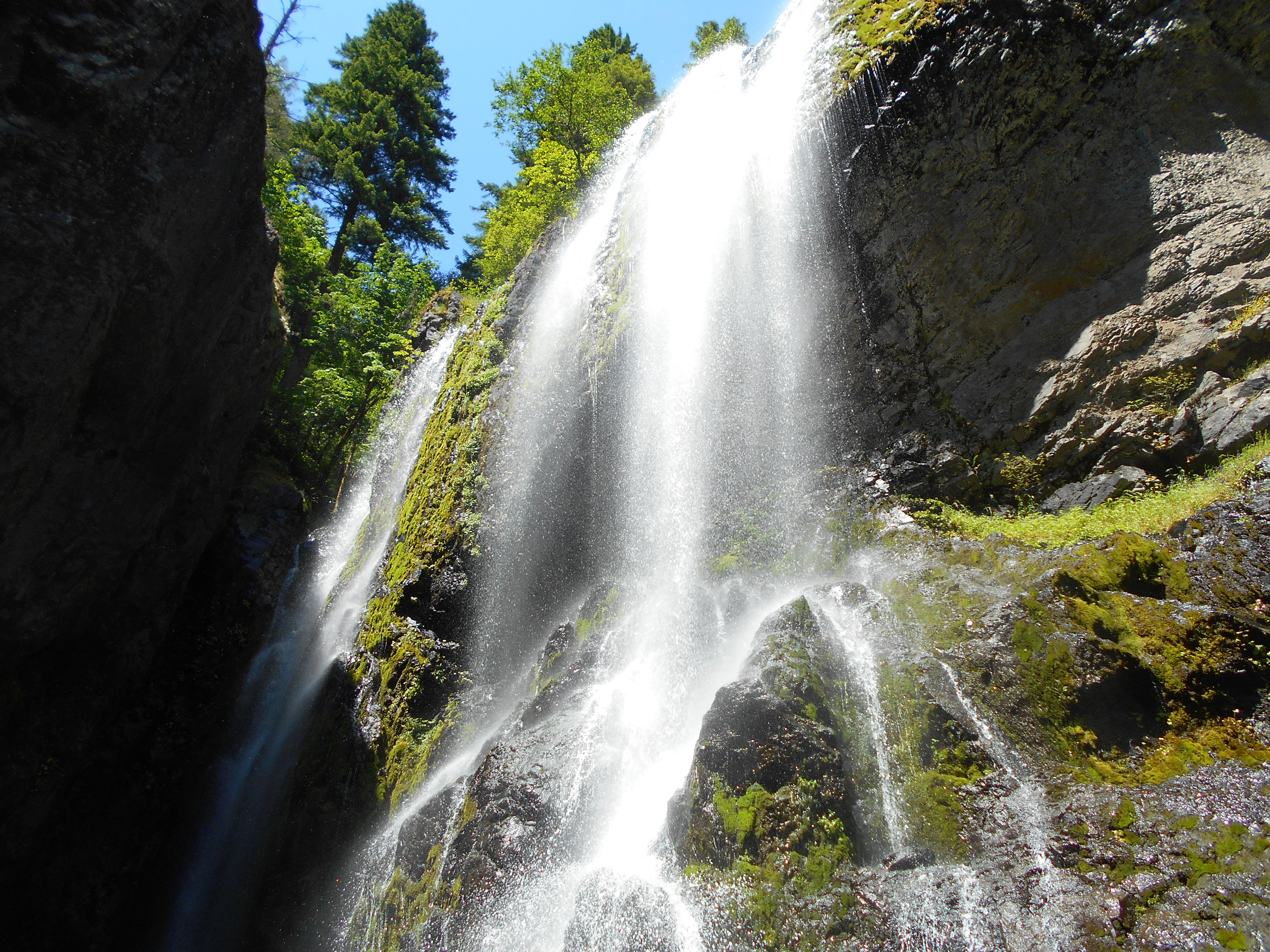
- Henline Falls
- Interactive map of Henline Falls
- Location: Opal Creek Wilderness
- Coordinates: 44.849°N 122.33938°W
- Type: Vertical curtain
- Elevation: 1,847 ft (563 m)
- Total height: 126 ft (38 m)
- Average flow rate: 25 cu ft/s (0.7 m^{3}/s)

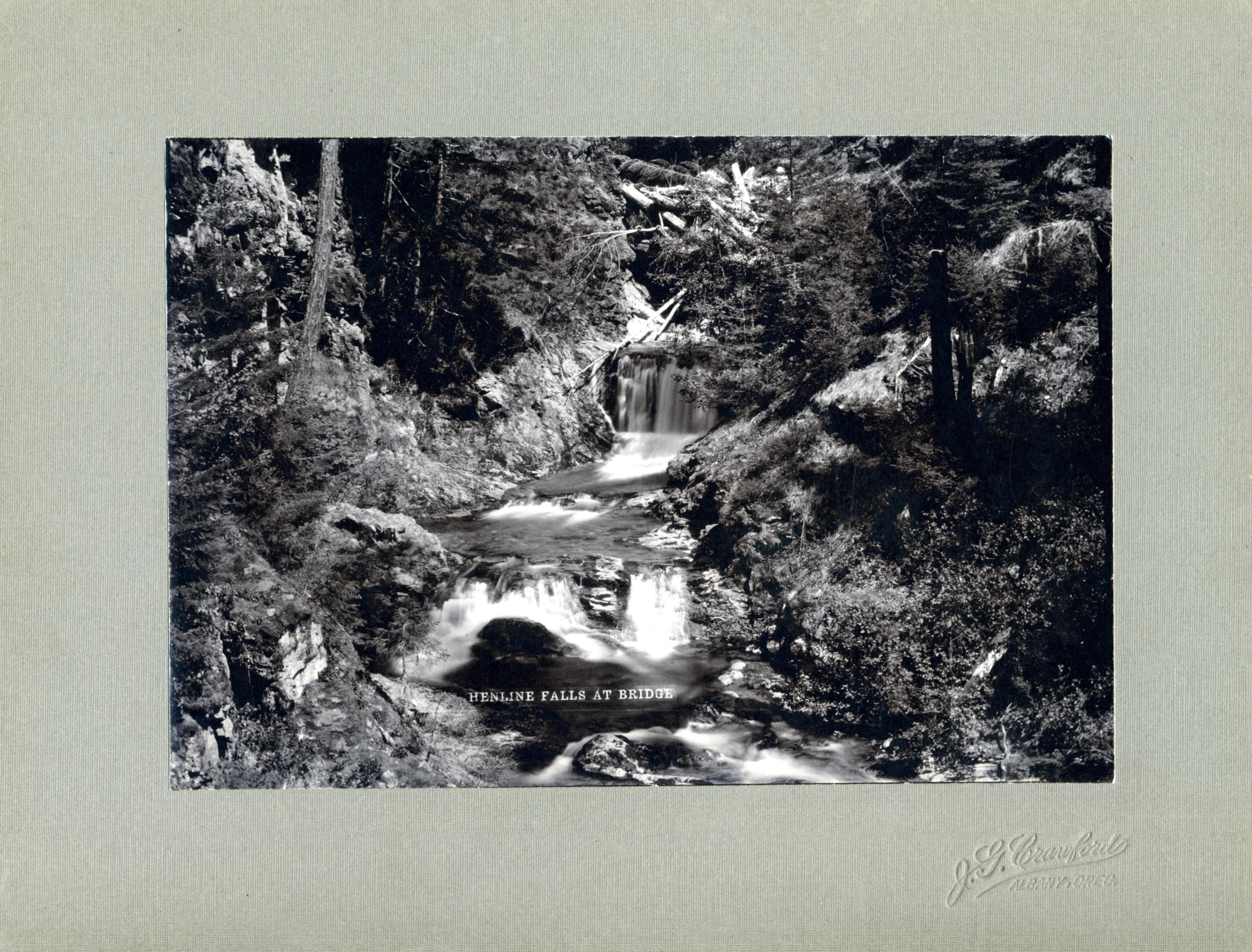
Henline Falls at Bridge

Henline Falls is a waterfall in the Opal Creek Wilderness in Oregon, USA.

Henline Falls has a height of 126 feet (38 m) and a width of 50 feet (15 m). Henline Creek supplies the flow of water to the falls.

Henline Falls is named from nearby Henline Mountain. There was a silver mine near the waterfall, resulting in the nickname Silver King Falls.
