= Battle Ax =

Mountain in Oregon, United States

- Location within Oregon

Highest point
- Elevation: 5,566 ft (1,697 m) NAVD 88
- Prominence: 1,018 ft (310 m)
- Coordinates: 44°49′36″N 122°08′23″W

Geography
- Location: Marion County, Oregon, U.S.
- Parent range: Cascades
- Topo map: USGS Battle Ax

Geology
- Rock age: 1 to 2 million years
- Mountain type: Shield volcano
- Volcanic arc: Cascade Volcanic Arc
- Last eruption: 1 million years ago

Climbing
- Easiest route: Trail hike

Battle Ax is a shield volcano in the West Cascade Range of Oregon. The shield is mostly made of andesite. The summit, which can be reached via the Battle Ax Mountain trail, marks the boundary between the Mount Hood National Forest and the Willamette National Forest as well as the boundary between the Opal Creek Wilderness and the Bull of the Woods Wilderness.

Battle Ax was supposedly named after the variety of chewing tobacco used by a local logger.

== See also ==
- List of volcanoes in the United States
- Cascade Volcanoes
