= Bull of the Woods Wilderness =

Wilderness area in Oregon, United States

- IUCN category Ib (wilderness area)
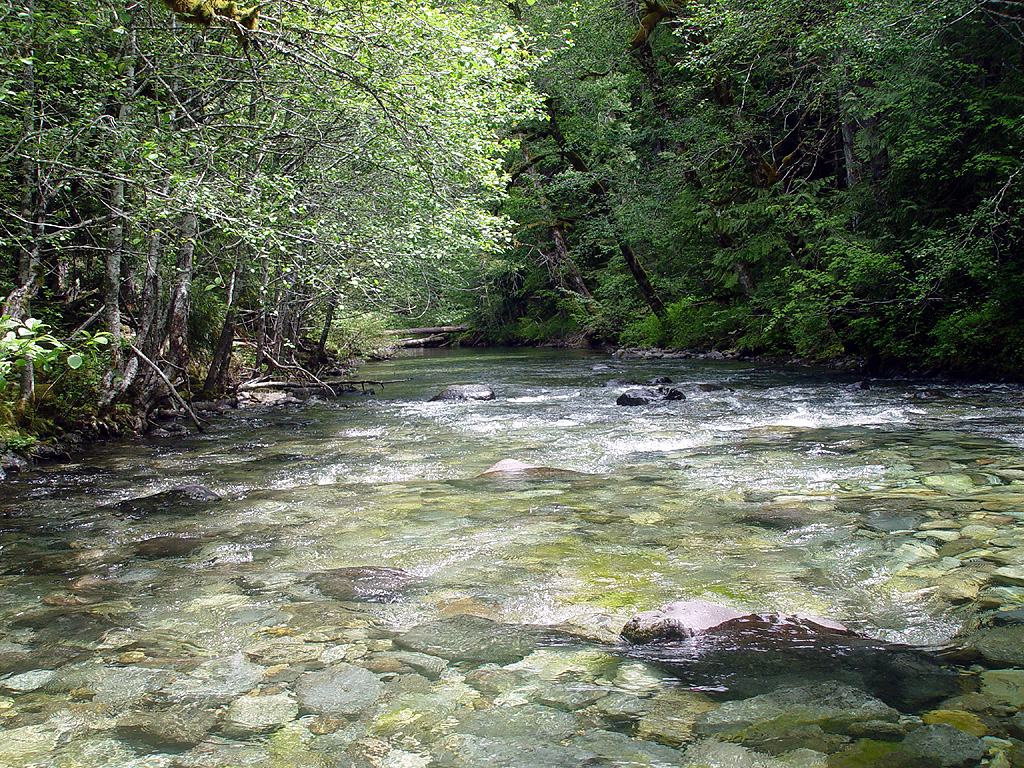
- Elk Lake Creek
- Interactive map of Bull of the Woods Wilderness
- Location: Clackamas / Marion counties, Oregon, USA
- Nearest city: Detroit, Oregon
- Coordinates: 44°52′14″N 122°07′02″W
- Area: 37,607 acres (15,219 ha)
- Established: 1984
- Governing body: U.S. Forest Service

The Bull of the Woods Wilderness is a wilderness area located in the Mount Hood National Forest in the northwestern Cascades of Oregon, United States. It was created in 1984 and consists of 37,607 acres (15,219 ha) including prime low-elevation old-growth forest, about a dozen lakes of at least 1-acre (4,000 m^{2}) and many large creeks and streams. Adjacent areas, including Opal Creek Wilderness to the west, create a pristine area of nearly 84 square miles (218 km^{2}). There are seven trails that access the wilderness area with an additional seven trails within the protection boundaries themselves. Combined the system provides 75 miles (121 km) of challenging terrain for both pedestrian and equestrian recreation. The name of the peak and thus the wilderness area comes from logging jargon in which the "bull of the woods" was the most experienced logging foreman in an operation.

== Topography ==
5,558-foot (1,694 m) tall Battle Ax summit is the highest point in the Wilderness. Among other tall peaks are 5,710-foot (1,740 m) Schreiner Peak, 5,526-foot (1,684 m) Big Slide Mountain and 5,523-foot (1,683 m) Bull of the Woods Mountain, from which the area derives its name. An abandoned fire lookout stands at the top of Bull of the Woods Mountain, from which views of the Cascades and the surrounding territory can be seen. The mountain slopes are quite steep, with lower inclines ranging from 30 to 60 degrees and upper inclines from 60 to 90 degrees. The wilderness contains the headwaters of the Collawash, and Little North Santiam rivers.

== Vegetation ==
The forest consists almost solely of coniferous species such as Douglas Fir, Western Hemlock, and Western Red Cedar, but deciduous red alder is also prevalent along creeks. Pacific yew is also common in certain parts of the wilderness, and rhododendrons can be seen blooming profusely throughout many areas around early June. Bull of the Woods contains one of the last stands of old growth in western Oregon, and is home to the northern spotted owl.

Much of the area burned in the 2020 Beachie Creek and 2021 Bull Complex Fires. Some untouched forest remains, primarily between Elk Lake and Bagby Hot Springs.

== Recreation ==
Primary recreational activities in Bull of the Woods include camping, hiking, wildlife watching, and soaking in the hot springs. It is possible to see relics of the 19th century gold rush, such as deserted mine shafts and old mining equipment. Various trails lead to a fire lookout at the peak of Bull of the Woods Mountain, with fantastic views of the Wilderness.

== Gallery ==
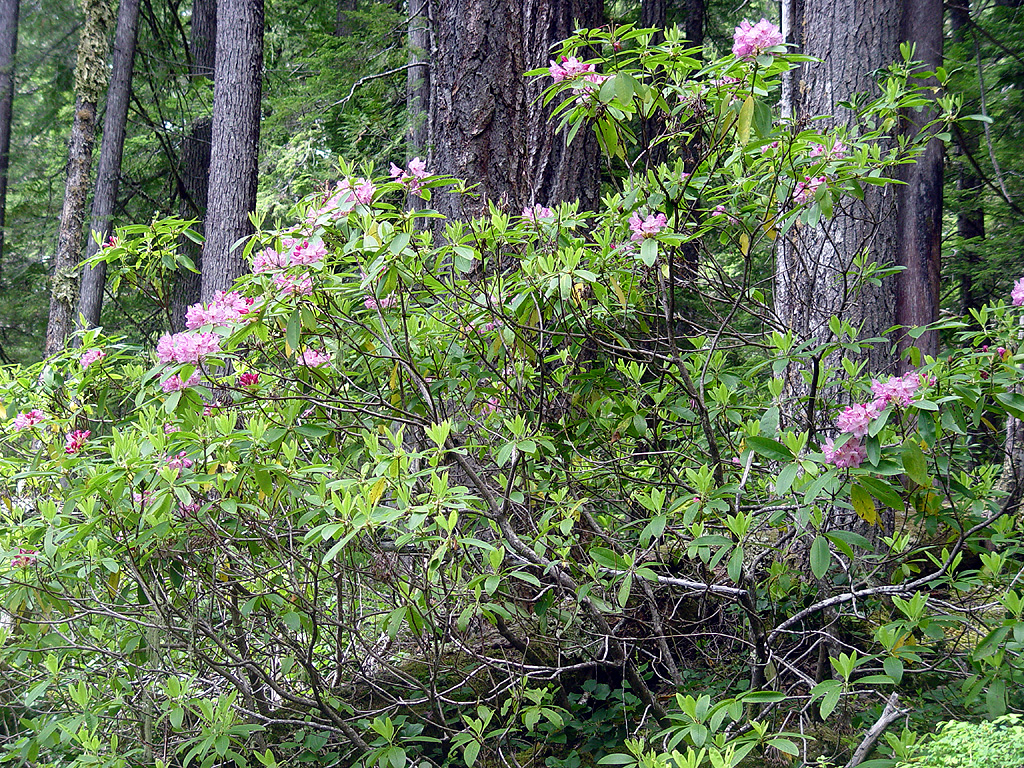
Rhododendrons blooming against a forest backdrop

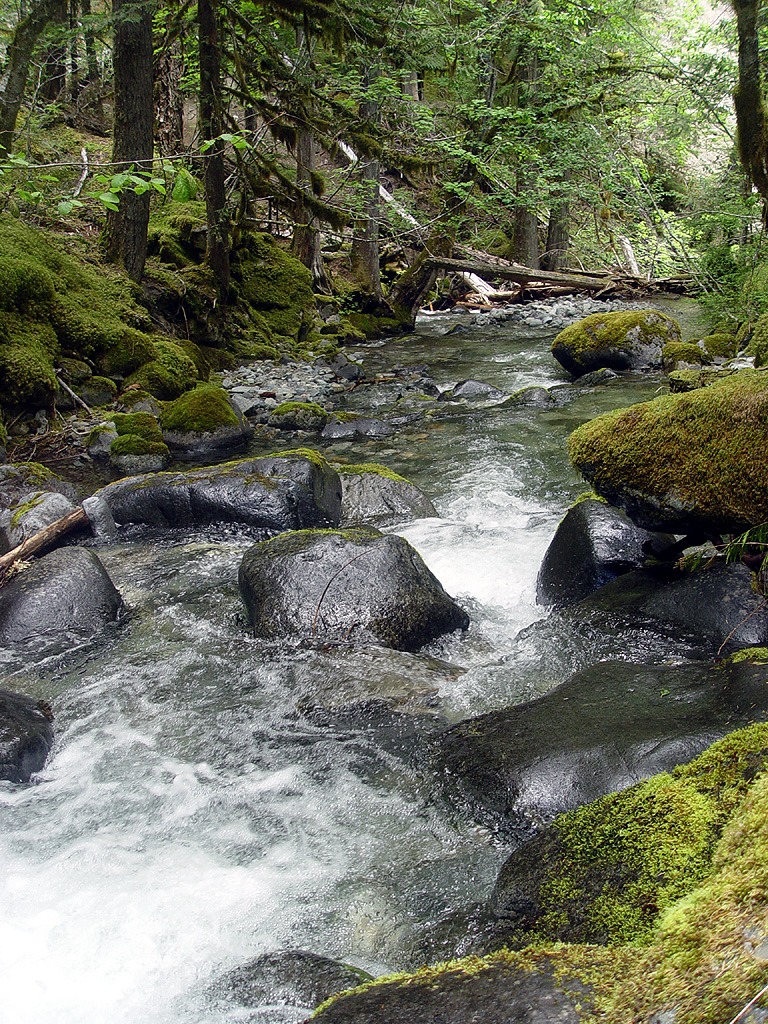
Welcome Creek in spring

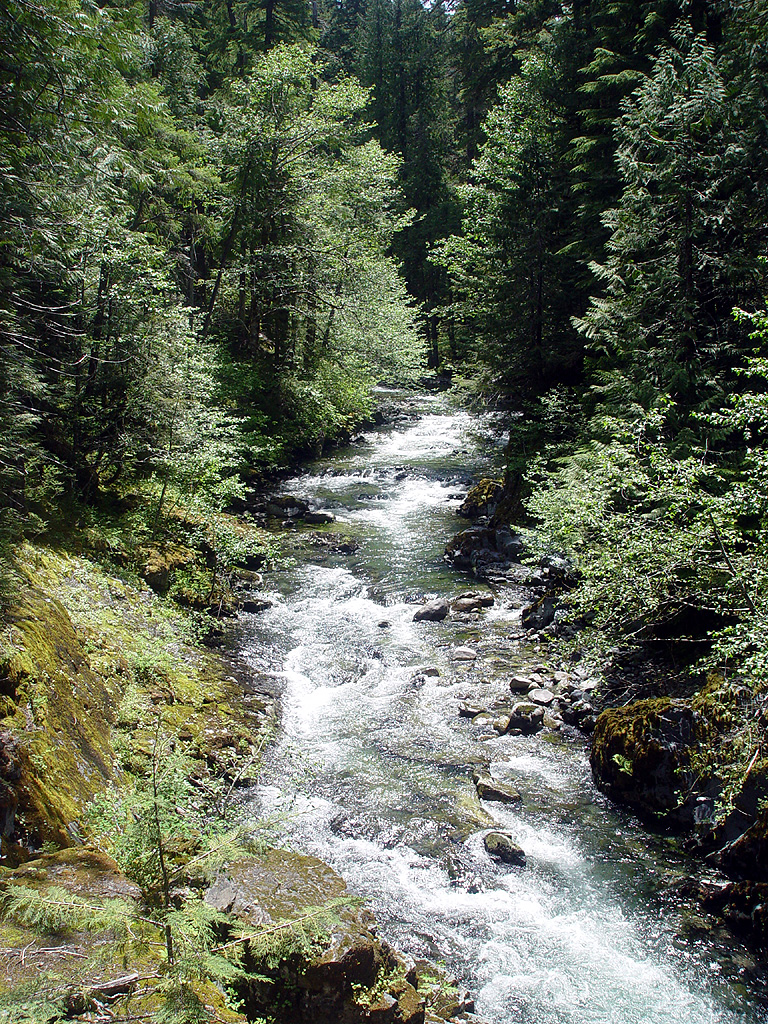
Rapids on Elk Lake Creek

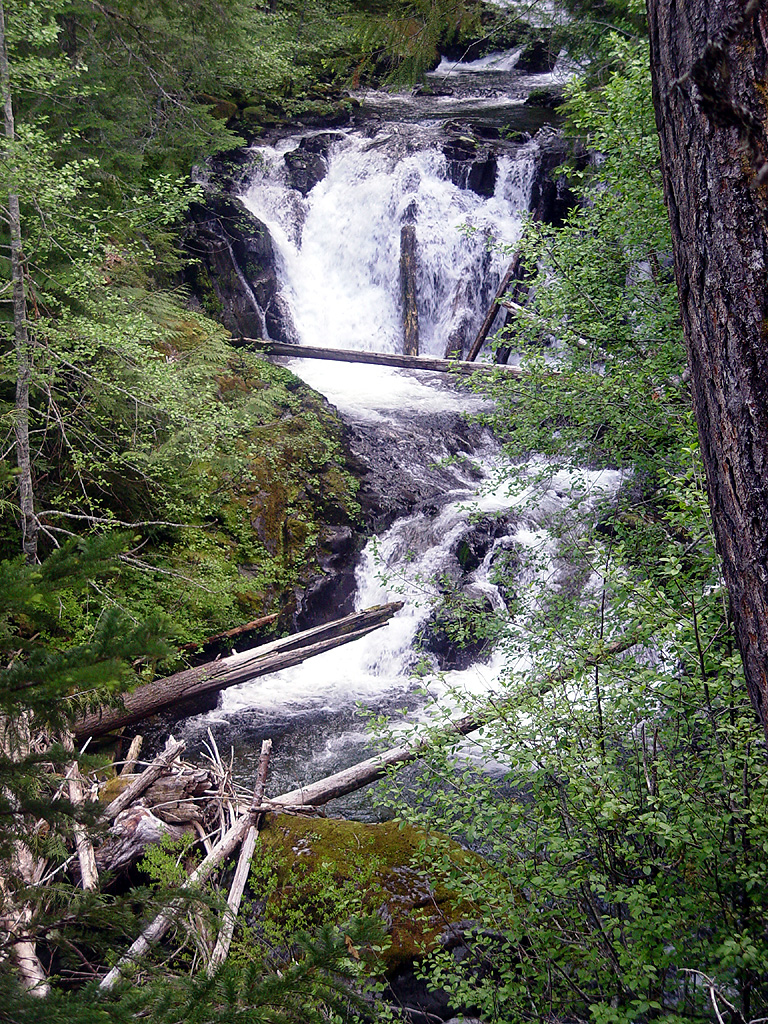
A hidden off-trail waterfall on Elk Lake Creek

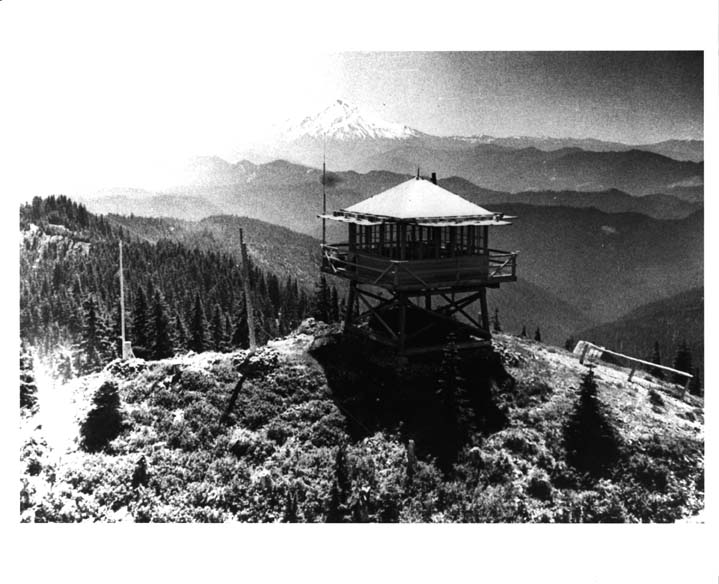
Fire lookout atop Bull of the Woods

== See also ==
- List of Oregon Wildernesses
- List of U.S. Wilderness Areas
- List of old growth forests
- Wilderness Act
