= Coffin Mountain =

Mountain peak in Oregon, United States

- Location within Oregon

Highest point
- Elevation: 5,770 ft (1,760 m)
- Coordinates: 44°37′17″N 122°02′39″W

Geography
- Location: Linn County
- Parent range: Cascades
- Topo map: National Forest Service

Geology
- Mountain type: Mountain

Climbing
- Easiest route: Trail

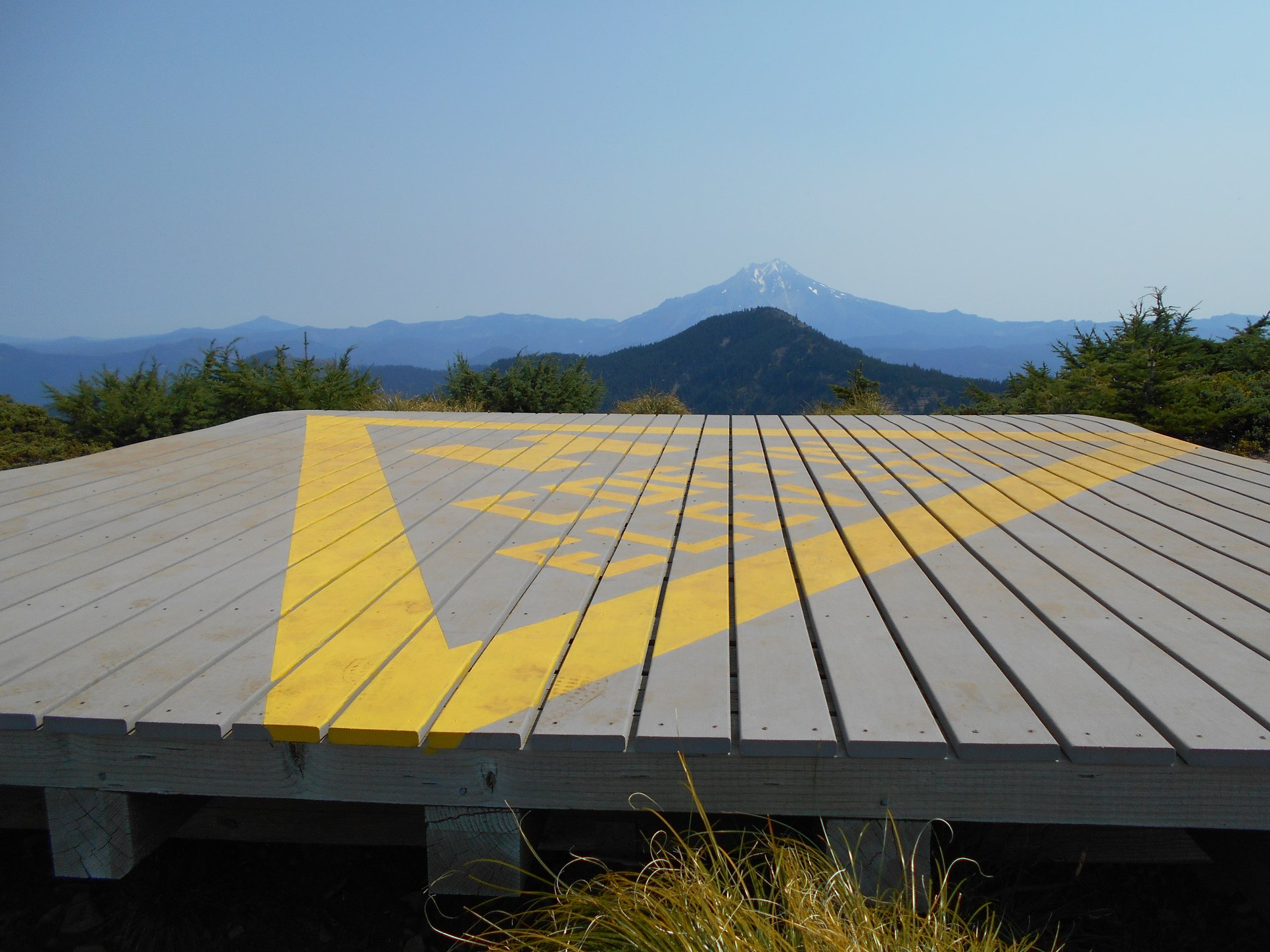
The helicopter pad on Coffin Mountain

Coffin Mountain is a mountain located in the Willamette National Forest in Linn County, Oregon.

Coffin Mountain is most well known for its hike that goes to the summit. It is situated nearby Bachelor Mountain. Coffin Mountain stands 5,770 ft above sea level (1,759 m). The summit has views of the Cascade Mountain Range. Coffin Mountain also has an array of wildflowers and beargrass. The Coffin Mountain Lookout was built in 1905 but the current lookout was built in 1984 along with a helicopter pad. The lookout rests on the north end of an elongated coffin-shaped ridge, hence the name. The lookout is used by the U.S. Forest Service during the summer months to spot wildfires.
