= TopoQuest =

Internet topographic mapping software

TopoQuest is a free web mapping service built on open-source software that provides internet-based topographic maps for most of the United States.

The site is one of three internet services used by Wikipedia for providing topographic maps. It arose to prominence in May 2008 after TopoZone, under new ownership, began requiring payment for access to its maps. TopoQuest map links are the same as TopoZone's except for the difference in the domain. It is operated by Ryan Niemi from Klamath Falls, Oregon.

== History ==
Niemi first experimented with a mapping program in July 2001 as a Linux, PHP and MySQL alternative to Microsoft's TerraServer-USA topographic mapviewer. The domain was registered at Go Daddy to Sunset Dynamics on August 10, 2004. However, Niemi did not aggressively develop the website because of the success of TopoZone.

After TopoZone started the for-pay business model on April 8, 2008, Niemi made updates to get the website to match the TopoZone URL methodology for viewing 1:24K USGS Digital raster graphic maps available from the Libre Map Project and Internet Archive and was operating by May 2008.

Code was adapted from the MapServer project at the University of Minnesota. The viewer was made seamless by incorporating GDAL. In addition to matching the TopoZone URLs, TopoQuest offers free downloads of GeoTIFFs, which TopoZone had only offered for a premium.

TopoQuest started adding Canadian 1:50K scale topographic maps in July 2008, and USGS 1:100K and 1:250K scale topographic maps in March 2009.
