= Libre Map Project =

The Libre Map Project was an online collection of all digital USGS 1:24K scale topographic maps (as well as various other GIS data) covering the United States, available as a free download.

== History ==
The Libre Map Project was started by Jared Benedict and around 100 additional individuals contributing money to purchase (or "liberate") a full set of 1:24K scale USGS topographic maps in Digital raster graphic form. The map files were then hosted by archive.org to ensure the map data will continue to be freely available to everyone indefinitely.

56,000 maps in digital raster graphic form were acquired on DVDs for $1600 to make the data available. Additional data made available through the project includes SVG boundary files for every US state, Topologically Integrated Geographic Encoding and Referencing (Tiger)/Line 2003 vector map data, and the USGS GeoNames database.

Based on the archive of the website on the Wayback Machine, the project closed in October 2017.

== See also ==
- TopoQuest
