= Jawbone Flats, Oregon =

- Unincorporated community
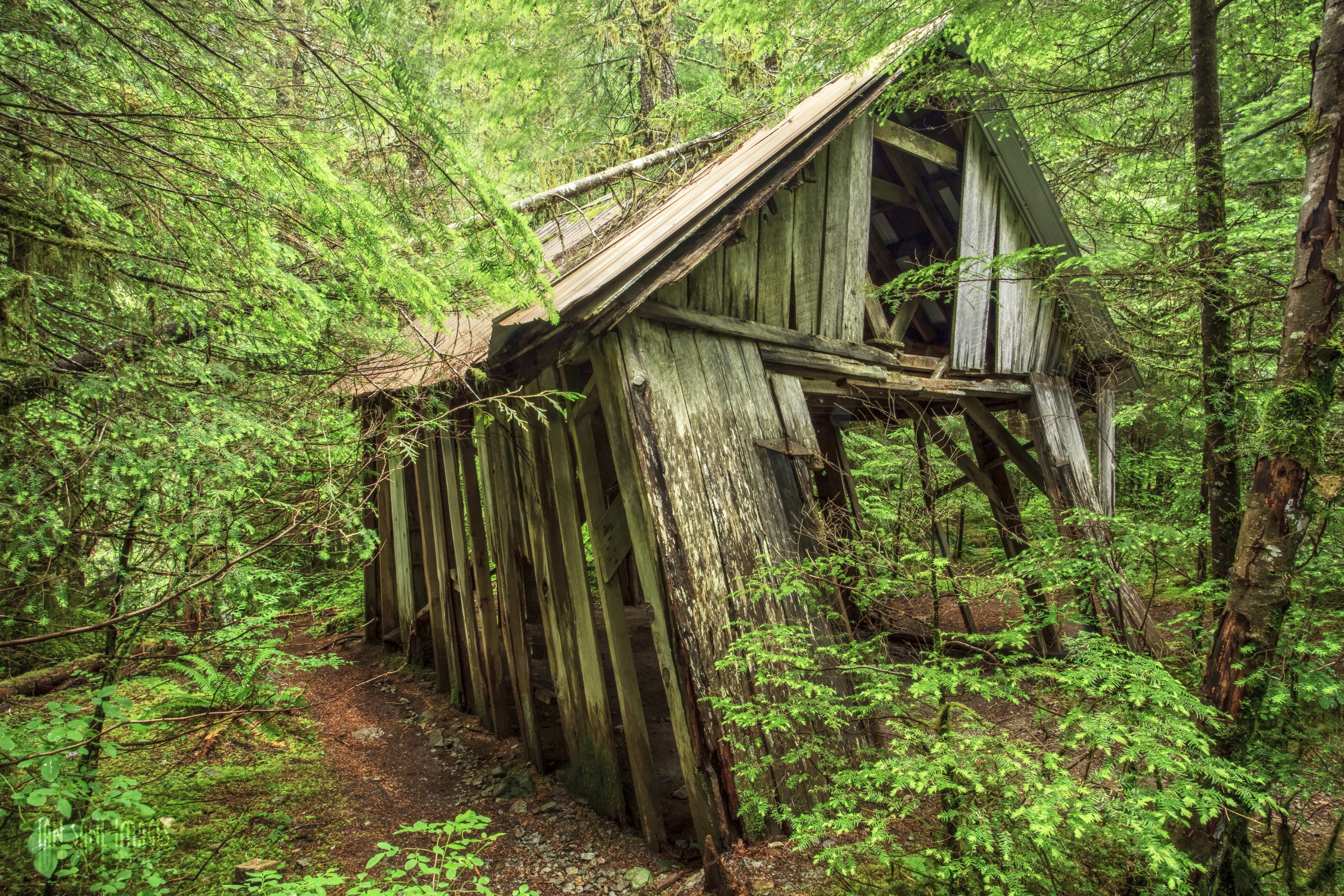
- Abandoned shed at Jawbone Flats

- Location within Oregon Location within the United States
- Coordinates: 44.84669°N 122.20993°W
- Country: United States
- State: Oregon
- County: Marion

Jawbone Flats is a ghost town in Marion County, Oregon, United States. It is located along Opal Creek, approximately 22 miles (35 km) from Salem, the state capitol, and is accessible via the Opal Pool Loop trail. Established in 1931, Jawbone Flats was a mining camp founded after miners discovered gold in the region in 1859.

== History ==
Jawbone Flats was established in 1931 by James Hewitt of the Amalgamated Mining Company, after miners had struck gold in the region in 1859. The company processed various metals found in the region, including lead, zinc, copper, and silver. Some of the roads built in the area, including the Gold Creek Bridge, were constructed under President Roosevelt's New Deal in 1939. The town population began to dwindle in the 1950s after snow damaged the buildings, and the mining operations proved unprofitable.

In 1992, after all mining operations had ceased in the region, the Shiny Rock Mining Company gifted 151 acres (61 ha) of oldgrowth forest, including Jawbone Flats, to the Friends of Opal Creek, a non-profit historical society. Contemporarily Jawbone Flats is accessible to the public, and hosts educational field trips for schools, as well as other events.

Jawbone Flats was largely destroyed by the Beachie Creek Fire in 2020.

== See also ==
- List of ghost towns in Oregon
