= Snow Peak (Oregon) =

Summit of the Cascade Range

- Location within Oregon

Highest point
- Elevation: 4,183 or 4,298 ft (1,275 or 1,310 m)
- Coordinates: 44.6307°N 122.5834°W

Geography
- Location: Linn County
- Parent range: Cascades
- Topo map: USGS Snow Peak

Geology
- Rock age: ~3 Ma (Pliocene)
- Mountain type: Shield volcano
- Volcanic arc: Cascade Volcanic Arc
- Last eruption: 3 million years ago

Climbing
- Easiest route: Trail

Snow Peak (also called Cleveland Rock) is a summit of the Oregon Cascades in the Willamette National Forest. It is located in an undeveloped area with only primitive road access.

== Fire lookout ==
A fire lookout was present on Snow Peak from August 1912—when a telephone line was installed. A lookout house was built in 1923, and then rebuilt or expanded in 1929. Newspapers and magazines were traditionally delivered to the fire lookout by pack burro, but on August 10, 1939, they were delivered by an accurate airdrop. On the last day of a quiet fire season, September 16, 1948, the lookout itself caught on fire when the departing observer cleaned up and put last of the trash in the stove as he left. The roof burned and fire's heat broke the windows.

The Columbus Day Storm of October 1962 damaged the lookout, which was replaced by a new 14 by 14 feet (4.3 m × 4.3 m) structure that cost $3500 in 1965 (equivalent $35,800 today.). The structure lasted until April 1980 when the remains of the station were dismantled after persistent neglect and vandalism.

== Geology ==
Snow Peak is a small extinct shield volcano. It last erupted around 3 million years ago. It is part of the Western Cascades.

== See also ==
- Snow Peak is also a retailer of outdoor gear and accessories. Founded in Japan in 1958, it expanded to the U.S. in 1999 through its flagship store in NW Portland and Soho, New York City.

== Works cited ==
- Wood, Charles A.; Kienle, Jürgen, eds. (1992). Volcanoes of North America. Cambridge University Press. ISBN 9780521438117.
