= Molala Kate Chantal =

Molala Kate Chantal (pronounced mow·laa·luh; c. 1844 – September 17, 1938) was one of the last speakers of the Molala language, and was known for her ability to teach the traditional and sacred art of beadwork and basket weaving.

== Life and career ==
Chantal was speculated to have been born in 1844 to Chief Yelkus (Kil-ke). She was born in what is now known as Molalla, Oregon. Living most of her youth near her brother Chief Henry Yelkus in Dickey Prairie in the foothill river valleys of the Cascades, which was believed to be the site of the original native village. She was married four times; the first marriage lasted a very short period and the man was never noted and forgotten by history. The second marriage took place in 1868 to Renaldo Matches who was a Hispanic man. He later became the father of her two children, Mathias John Williams (who went by John), followed by her daughter Lizzie. She then went on to re-marry an Irishman named James Smith who lived near the Chemawa Indian School, which her two children attended. After they finished boarding school, both children went on to the Siletz Reservation. Both married soon after and had children of their own. She moved with her children onto the reservation and re-married yet again in 1894 to Grand Ronde tribal member Louis Chanta for the fourth and final time. She lived with him, her children, and her grandchildren well into her nineties. She died on September 17, 1938.
