= Western Cascades =

Region of Oregon, United States

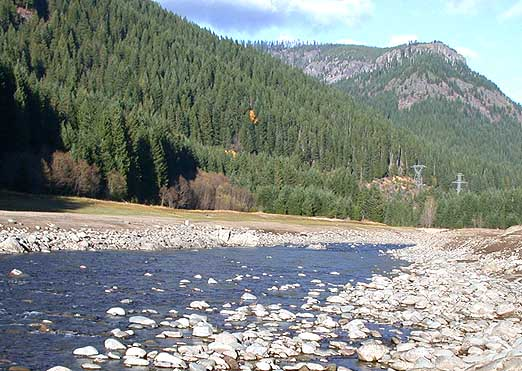
- The Western Cascades have been highly eroded by rivers (Breitenbush River pictured)

Geography
- Location within Oregon
- Country: United States
- State: Oregon

The Western Cascades or Old Cascades are a sub-province of the Cascade Range in the U.S. state of Oregon, between the Willamette Valley and the High Cascades. The Western Cascades contain many extinct shield volcanoes, cinder cones and lava flows, and the region is highly eroded and heavily forested. Deposits of the same age as the Western Cascades are also found in southwest Washington state.

== Geology ==
The region was volcanically active from approximately 35 to 17 million years ago. The province is characterized as an older, deeply eroded volcanic range lying west of the more recent High Cascades. The Western Cascades range in elevation from 1,700 feet (520 m) on the western margin to 5,800 feet (1,800 m) on the eastern margin. The Western Cascades began to form 40 million years ago with eruptions from a chain of volcanoes near the Eocene shoreline. Volcanic activity gradually shifted to the east in the Miocene and Pliocene.

The Western Cascades are made up almost entirely of slightly deformed and partly altered volcanic flows and pyroclastic rocks, which range in age from late Eocene to late Miocene. These rocks have been heavily dissected by erosion. Occasional remnants of volcanic necks or plugs marking former vents are the only preserved evidence of the many volcanoes that made up the Western Cascades. There are also minor Pliocene to Pleistocene intracanyon lavas derived from the High Cascades or rare local vents. From youngest to oldest, the Western Cascade Range consists of four main units:

1. 0- to 4-million-year-old intracanyon basalt and basaltic andesite flows from the High Cascade Range.
2. 4- to 9-million-year-old basalt and basaltic andesite flows with lesser amounts of andesite and dacite. These rocks which cap the highest Western Cascade ridges were erupted prior to uplift and faulting along the east margin of the Western Cascade Range. This unit is compositionally identical to unit 1 and other rocks of the High Cascade Range, and therefore was probably erupted from vents in and adjacent to the High Cascades.
3. 9- to 18-million-year-old basalt, basaltic andesite, and andesite lavas with lesser amounts of dacite tuffs and lavas.
4. 18- to 40-million-year-old silicic tuffs and lavas. Units 3 and 4 were erupted from many vents west of known High Cascade volcanic centers, although some of these older vents may be buried beneath the High Cascade Range.

== Wildlife ==
Wildlife species richness is not as high in the Western Cascades as it is in other temperate coniferous forests. However, the region is notable for comparatively high amphibian endemism. A diverse range of plant species, including numerous endemics, are found in the region, but are especially concentrated near Mount Rainier in Washington and in the Columbia River Gorge. A number of amphibian targets are either Western Cascades endemics or have a limited distribution. The Cascades torrent salamander (Rhyacotriton cascadae) and Larch Mountain salamander (Plethodon larselli) are restricted to the Western Cascades, whereas Cope's giant salamander (Dicamptodon copei), Van Dyke's salamander (Plethodon vandykei), and the Cascades frog (Rana cascadae) occur only in the Western Cascades and Pacific coast. Of these, the Larch Mountain and Van Dyke's salamanders and the Cascades frog are federal Species of Concern. Most of these amphibians are also closely associated with fast-moving, cold mountain streams.

== Notable vents ==
| Name | Elevation | | Location | Last eruption |
| Name | meters | feet | Coordinates | Last eruption |
| Armet Creek | - | - | - | ~0.56 million years ago |
| Battle Ax Mountain | - | - | 44°54′N 122°12′W | 1-2 million years ago |
| Crescent Mountain | - | - | - | - |
| Harter Mountain | - | - | - | - |
| High Prairie | - | - | - | ~1.98 million years ago |
| Iron Mountain | - | - | - | - |
| Snow Peak | - | - | - | ~3 million years ago |
| Three Pyramids | - | - | - | - |

== See also ==
- List of volcanoes in the United States
- Types of volcanic eruptions
