= Opal Creek Wilderness =

Wilderness area in the Willamette National Forest

- IUCN category Ib (wilderness area)
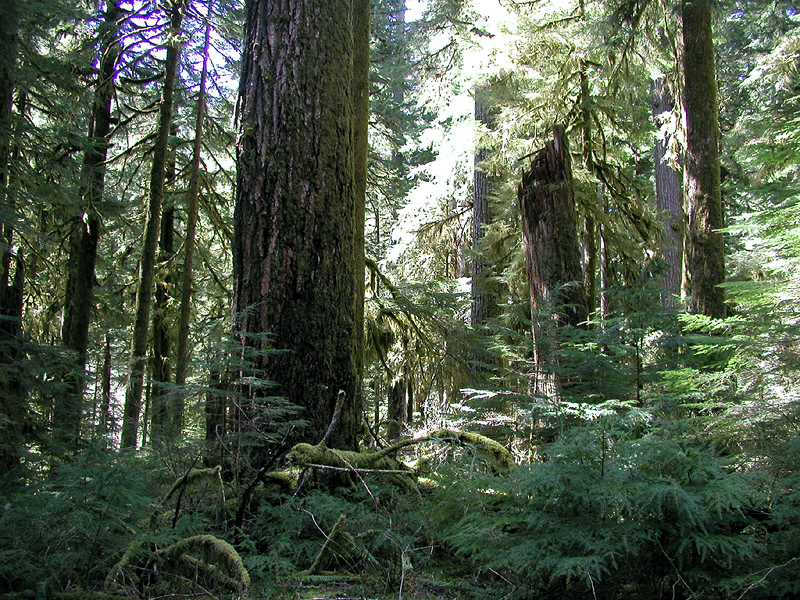
- Old growth in Opal Creek Wilderness
- Interactive map of Opal Creek Wilderness
- Location: Marion / Clackamas counties, Oregon, United States
- Nearest city: Detroit, Oregon
- Coordinates: 44°50′48.14″N 122°12′32.79″W
- Area: 20,746 acres (8,396 ha)
- Established: September 30, 1996
- Governing body: United States Forest Service

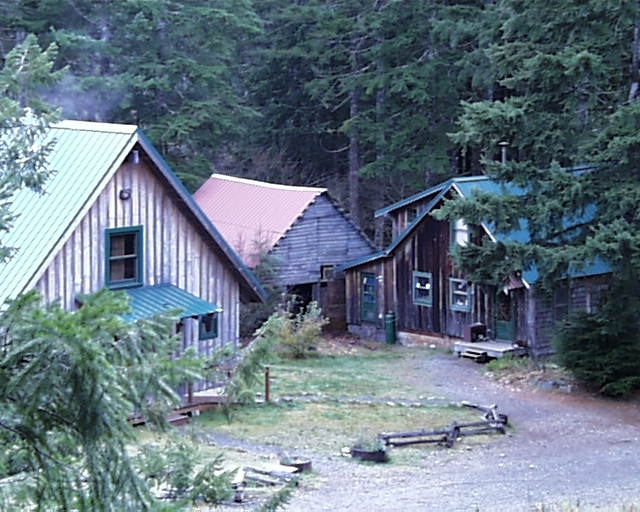
Cabins of former mining community of Jawbone Flats, now owned by Opal Creek Ancient Forest Center

The Opal Creek Wilderness is a wilderness area located in the Willamette National Forest in the U.S. state of Oregon, on the border of the Mount Hood National Forest. It has the largest uncut watershed in Oregon.

Opal Creek and nearby Opal Lake were named for Opal Elliott, wife of early Forest Service ranger Roy Elliott.

Much of the valley's old-growth forest was burnt in a 2020 wildfire, and, as of 2026, it has been closed to the public since then.

== Geography and ecology ==
The 20,746-acre (8,396 ha) Opal Creek Wilderness is adjacent to a designated "scenic recreation area" of 13,538 acres (5,479 ha), creating a nearly 35,000-acre (14,000 ha) protected area. In addition, the 36,870-acre (14,920 ha) Bull of the Woods Wilderness in the Mount Hood National Forest shares its southern boundary with the Opal Creek Wilderness.

The Opal Creek Valley contains 50 waterfalls and five lakes. Eight hiking trails, remnants of the early day prospecting and fire access routes, total 36 miles (58 km). Before a 2020 wildfire, the valley held the largest intact stand of old-growth forest in the western Cascades, and 500- to 1000-year-old trees were common. The most abundant trees are Douglas fir, Pacific silver fir, and western hemlock. Common hardwoods include bigleaf maple and red alder. Understory vegetation includes huckleberry, vine maple and rhododendron.

== History ==
The wilderness was designated on September 30, 1996, after a nearly 20-year battle to protect the area from logging and mining. In 1980, the District Ranger of the Detroit Ranger District, Dave Alexander, vowed to "cut Opal Creek." By late 1981, clearcut boundary markers were placed. Lawsuits were filed, Wild and Scenic Rivers were designated, and multiple bills to protect the area failed, including an attempt to make it a state park. When books and photo essays were published in the early 1990s, national attention was brought to the area. Finally, in 1996, after working with all stakeholders, including environmental groups, local communities and representatives of the timber industry, to draft consensus legislation, United States Senator Mark Hatfield obtained passage of expansive legislation to protect Opal Creek.

=== 2020 Beachie Creek Fire ===
The Opal Creek Wilderness is within the burn zone of the Beachie Creek Fire that began approximately two miles south of Jawbone Flats on August 16, 2020, one of several major wildfires on the West Coast that summer.

The fire destroyed most of Opal Creek's old growth forest. As of 2026, the region had been closed to the public since the fire while repairs were made to facilities.

== See also ==
- List of old growth forests
- List of Oregon Wildernesses
- List of U.S. Wilderness Areas
- Wilderness Act
