= TopoZone =

Website offering free online topographic maps

TopoZone is a website operated by Locality LLC that offers free online topographic maps.

It was founded in November 1999 by Ed McNierney whose company Maps a la carte, Inc. operated out of North Chelmsford, Massachusetts. Prior to founding the company, McNierney, an organic chemistry graduate of Dartmouth College, was chief technology officer for Eastman Software, a division of Eastman Kodak.

In 2003 the company partnered with the National Map making its 20-Terabyte library of digital topographic maps and aerial photography available to the USGS. The 2003 press release of the partnership said that 300 million maps had been served from 1999 to 2003.

TopoZone was one of the first topographic mapping site on the web, providing visitors with free viewing and printing of the full set of United States Geological Survey topographic maps covering the entire United States. The maps are produced by the USGS, which encourages the distribution of their maps through business partners. TopoZone offered aerial photographs from the USGS and street maps from the United States Census Bureau. In 2007 complete coverage of Canada was added, using the topographic map series produced by Natural Resources Canada.

In 2007 McNierney sold the company to Demand Media and stayed on as chief mapmaker until the company was taken over by Trails.com.

On April 9, 2008, Topozone was incorporated into Demand Media's Hillclimb Media subsidiary Trails.com. Demand Media discontinued the site in 2014 and it was eventually acquired by Locality LLC and relaunched in December 2015.

== See also ==
- TerraServer-USA
- TopoQuest
