= Mount Jefferson (Oregon) =

Stratovolcano in the Cascade Range, Oregon, US

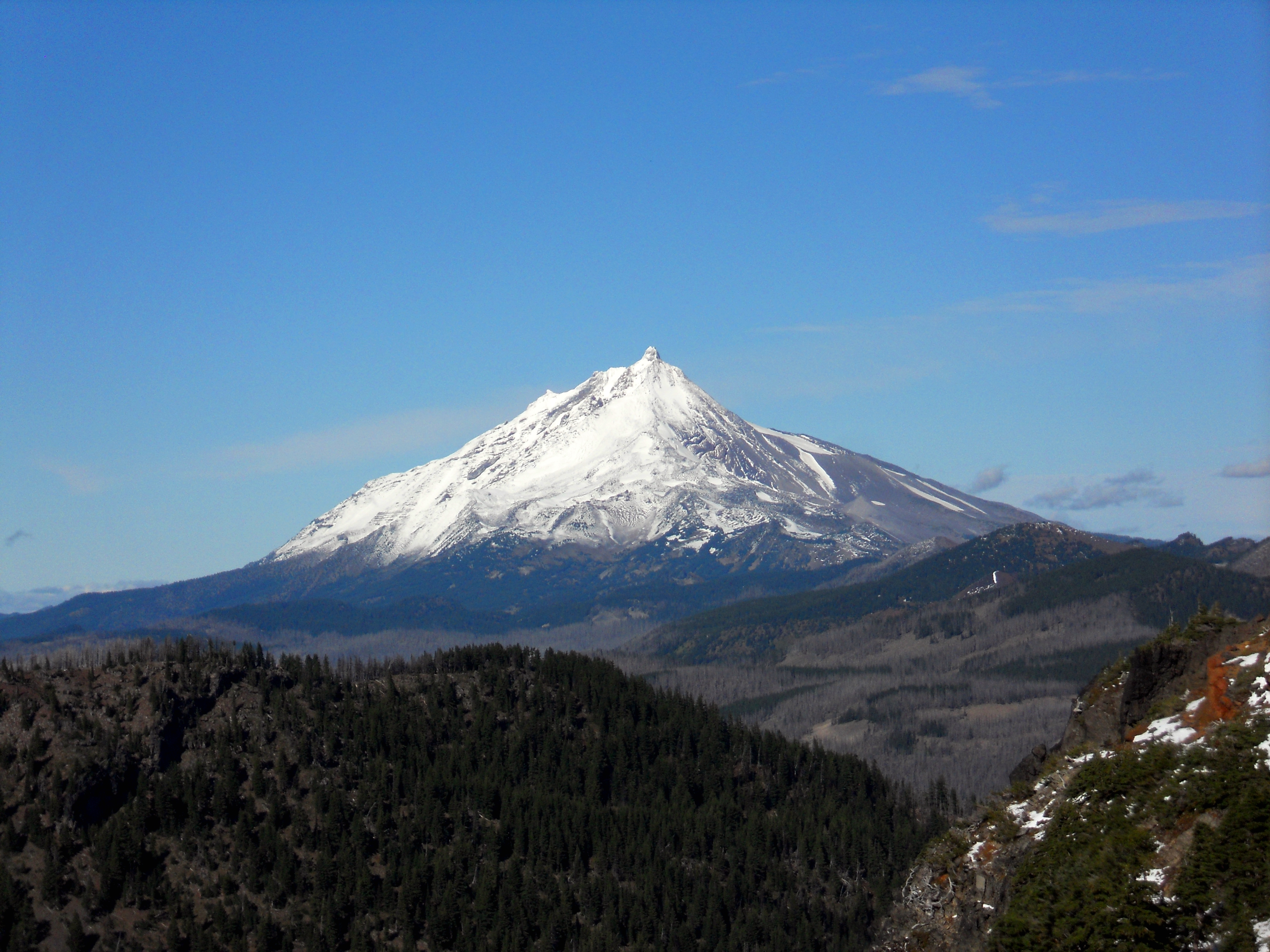
- South face of Mount Jefferson viewed from the north side of Three Fingered Jack

Highest point
- Elevation: 10,502 ft (3,201 m) NAVD 88
- Prominence: 5,777 ft (1,761 m)
- Listing: Oregon county high points; US most prominent peaks 75th
- Coordinates: 44°40′27″N 121°47′58″W

Geography
- Location within Oregon
- Location: Jefferson, Linn and Marion counties, Oregon, U.S.
- Parent range: Cascade Range
- Topo map: USGS Mount Jefferson

Geology
- Formed by: Subduction zone volcanism
- Rock age: Less than 100,000 years
- Mountain type: Stratovolcano
- Volcanic arc: Cascade Volcanic Arc
- Last eruption: 950 AD

Climbing
- First ascent: 1888 by R. L. Farmer and E. C. Cross
- Easiest route: Rock climb

Mount Jefferson is a stratovolcano in the Cascade Volcanic Arc, part of the Cascade Range in the U.S. state of Oregon. The second highest mountain in Oregon, it is situated within Linn County, Jefferson County, and Marion County and forms part of the Mount Jefferson Wilderness. Due to the ruggedness of its surroundings, the mountain is one of the hardest volcanoes to reach in the Cascades. It is also a popular tourist destination despite its remoteness, with recreational activities including hiking, backpacking, mountaineering, and photography. Vegetation at Mount Jefferson is dominated by Douglas fir, silver fir, mountain hemlock, ponderosa pine, lodgepole pine, and several cedar species. Carnivores, insectivores, bats, rodents, deer, birds, and various other species inhabit the area.

Also known as Seekseekqua by Native American populations, the volcano was named after United States President Thomas Jefferson, and was first ascended by E. C. Cross and R. L. Farmer in 1888. It sits atop an area of crustal melting, and was produced by the subduction of the oceanic Juan de Fuca tectonic plate under the continental North American tectonic plate, forming about 730,000 years ago. Consisting of basaltic andesite, andesite, and dacite, the mountain has been extensively altered by glacial erosion. The surrounding area contains a number of other volcanic features like cinder cones, shield volcanoes, and tuyas (flat-topped, steep-sided volcanoes formed when lava erupts through a thick glacier or ice sheet). It is considered a low threat by the United States Geological Survey. Despite the low chance of future eruptions, many scientists still consider mudflows a major threat at Mount Jefferson.

== Geography ==
The second tallest mountain in the U.S. state of Oregon after Mount Hood, Mount Jefferson lies within Jefferson, Linn, and Marion counties, in the central part of the state. Reaching an elevation of 10,497 feet (3,199 m), the volcano has a proximal relief of 4,890 feet (1,490 m). It is not usually visible from the city of Portland, though it is visible on clear days from Salem and can be noticed from highways to both the east and the west of the Cascade Range. The average elevation of the terrain around Jefferson is 5,500 to 6,500 feet (1,700 to 2,000 m), meaning that Jefferson's cone rises nearly 1 mile (1.6 km) above its surroundings.

=== Wilderness ===
Mount Jefferson's eastern segment lies within the Warm Springs Indian Reservation, and its western portion within the Mount Jefferson Wilderness, of the Willamette National Forest and Deschutes National Forests. The wilderness area covers 111,177 acres (449.92 km^{2}), with more than 150 lakes. It also has 190 miles (310 km) of trails, including 40 miles (64 km) of the Pacific Crest National Scenic Trail. Mount Jefferson is the major feature of the wilderness, along with the nearby Three Fingered Jack volcano.

=== Physical geography ===
Mount Jefferson lies in the temperate maritime climate of Western Oregon. The Cascades absorb east-moving moisture, causing warm and dry summers. Winters show higher precipitation levels, especially at higher elevations, averaging 140 to 160 inches (3,500 to 4,000 mm) at peak altitudes and consisting mostly of snow. Moving east, annual precipitation levels decrease from 98 inches (2,500 mm) to lower than 16 inches (400 mm).

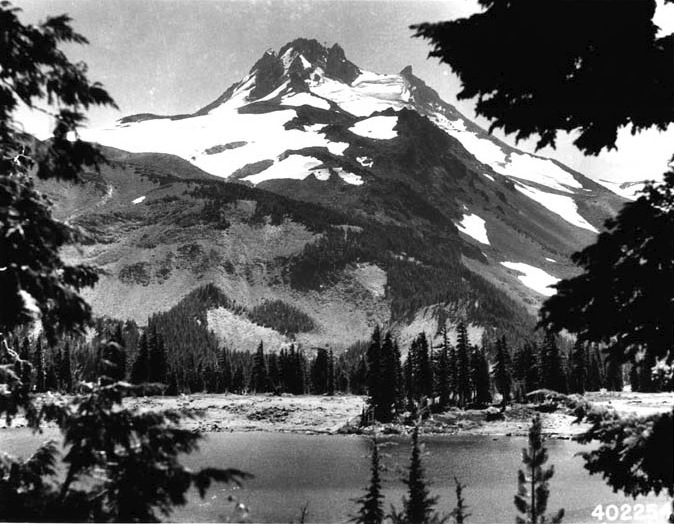
A view of Mount Jefferson from Russell Lake in 1934

When Little Ice Age glaciers retreated during the 20th century, water filled in the spaces left behind, forming moraine-dammed lakes, which are more common in the Mount Jefferson Wilderness and the nearby Three Sisters Wilderness than anywhere else in the contiguous United States. A number of these lakes breached during the 20th century and inundated Jefferson Park and the Jefferson Creek drainage under Waldo Glacier. These breach events yielded floods and small lahars (volcanically induced mudslides, landslides, and debris flows). The flood on August 21, 1934, at a lake formed near Whitewater Glacier, created a debris flow that reached the Whitewater River drainage and buried parts of Jefferson Park in 1 to 8 feet (0.30 to 2.44 m) of debris; another event took place in 1957, but was poorly documented.

Mount Jefferson has 35 snow and ice features, including four named glaciers: Whitewater, Jefferson Park, Russell, and Waldo. These features, for the most part on the northern, eastern, and southeastern parts of Mount Jefferson, span elevations from 6,158 to 8,189 feet (1,877 to 2,496 m) and cover an area of 2.1 square miles (5.5 km^{2}). The volcano, like much of the Oregon Cascades, was likely covered by an ice cap during the Pleistocene, with the glaciers at their peak size between 25,000 and 20,000 years ago. In recent years, the glaciers have retreated to form lateral moraines; Whitewater Glacier, for example, shrunk from 5 miles (8.0 km) in width and 1 to 2 miles (1.6 to 3.2 km) in length to 1.9 miles (3.1 km) in width and a length of 0.62 miles (1 km). During the 20th century, scientists thought they had identified a new glacier, which they named Milk Creek Glacier, but later studies established that it was an artifact of stagnant ice that had been hidden by debris, and it is no longer considered its own distinct feature.

Other geographic features at Jefferson include rock outcrops, steep talus slopes, conifer forests, and alpine meadows. Additionally, a number of rivers drain Mount Jefferson. The northern and northwestern slopes feed the South Fork Breitenbush River, which flows into Detroit Lake, and the eastern side of Detroit Lake also receives water from Whitewater Creek, Russell Creek, and Milk Creek, which flow from the western flank of Mount Jefferson. The Whitewater Glacier and the northeastern side of the volcano drain into the Whitewater River, and Shitike Creek flows between Mount Jefferson and Olallie Butte before reaching the Deschutes River. Both Jefferson and Parker Creeks receive water from Jefferson's southeastern slopes, then join the Metolius River.

Wildfires occur within the wilderness area at Mount Jefferson. In the late summer to early fall of 2017, the Whitewater and Little Devil fires occurred. While the Little Devil fire covered 485 acres (1.96 km^{2}), the Whitewater fire reached more than 10,000 acres (40 km^{2}) in area, provoking the use of amphibious aircraft and causing trail closures. As a result of the Whitewater fire, officials closed the Mount Jefferson Wilderness during the solar eclipse of August 21, 2017.

== Climate ==
Climate data for Mount Jefferson 44.6746 N, 121.8003 W, Elevation: 9,780 ft (2,980 m) (1991–2020 normals)
Month	Jan	Feb	Mar	Apr	May	Jun	Jul	Aug	Sep	Oct	Nov	Dec	Year
Mean daily maximum °F (°C)	25.3 (−3.7)	24.6 (−4.1)	25.5 (−3.6)	29.0 (−1.7)	37.7 (3.2)	44.7 (7.1)	55.6 (13.1)	55.9 (13.3)	50.9 (10.5)	40.6 (4.8)	28.8 (−1.8)	24.2 (−4.3)	36.9 (2.7)
Daily mean °F (°C)	19.6 (−6.9)	17.6 (−8.0)	17.5 (−8.1)	19.9 (−6.7)	27.4 (−2.6)	33.7 (0.9)	43.1 (6.2)	43.4 (6.3)	39.1 (3.9)	30.9 (−0.6)	22.6 (−5.2)	18.7 (−7.4)	27.8 (−2.3)
Mean daily minimum °F (°C)	13.9 (−10.1)	10.5 (−11.9)	9.5 (−12.5)	10.9 (−11.7)	17.2 (−8.2)	22.7 (−5.2)	30.5 (−0.8)	30.8 (−0.7)	27.2 (−2.7)	21.3 (−5.9)	16.4 (−8.7)	13.2 (−10.4)	18.7 (−7.4)
Average precipitation inches (mm)	16.95 (431)	12.60 (320)	13.54 (344)	10.95 (278)	7.51 (191)	4.97 (126)	1.19 (30)	1.23 (31)	4.10 (104)	10.24 (260)	16.53 (420)	19.33 (491)	119.14 (3,026)
Source: PRISM Climate Group

== Ecology ==
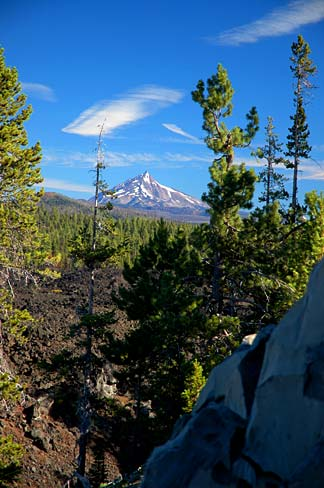
A coniferous forest near Mount Jefferson (Jefferson visible in the background)

Vegetation at Mount Jefferson is dominated by Douglas fir, silver fir, mountain hemlock, ponderosa pine, lodgepole pine, and several species of cedar. Vine maple, rhododendron, purple lupine, yellow lupine, Indian paintbrush, wild strawberries, and red huckleberries are also common around Mount Jefferson. Above the timber line at 7,200 feet (2,200 m) above sea level, mountain hemlock and whitebark pine predominate, though mountain hemlock has also invaded into subalpine meadows at Mount Jefferson, possibly as a result of fire control programs, grazing, the influence of adjacent forest areas, and climate change.

Carnivorous animals at Mount Jefferson and its surroundings include American black bears, coyotes, cougars, red foxes, raccoons, American martens, stoats (also known as ermines), long-tailed weasels, American minks, North American river otters, and bobcats. Deer species include Roosevelt elk, black-tailed deer, and mule deer; insectivores include vagrant shrews, American water shrews, and coast moles. Bats at Jefferson include little brown bats and silver-haired bats, and American pikas and snowshoe hares are also present. Rodents such as yellow-bellied marmots, mountain beavers, yellow-pine chipmunks, Townsend's chipmunks, golden-mantled ground squirrels, western gray squirrels, Douglas squirrels, mountain pocket gophers, North American beavers, deer mice, bushy-tailed woodrats, water voles, Pacific jumping mice, and North American porcupines are present.

Birds at Jefferson include mallards, northern goshawks, sharp-shinned hawks, red-tailed hawks, dusky grouse, grey partridges, killdeer, spotted sandpipers, California gulls, band-tailed pigeons, great horned owls, mountain pygmy owls, common nighthawks, rufous hummingbirds, Northern flickers, pileated woodpeckers, yellow-bellied sapsuckers, hairy woodpeckers, and white-headed woodpeckers. Other bird species found in the area consist of American three-toed woodpeckers, willow flycatchers, olive-sided flycatchers, tree swallows, Canada jays, Steller's jays, common ravens, Clark's nutcrackers, black-capped chickadees, mountain chickadees, chestnut-backed chickadees, red-breasted nuthatches, pygmy nuthatches, brown creepers, American dippers, wrens, American robins, varied thrushes, hermit thrushes, Townsend's solitaires, golden-crowned kinglets, ruby-crowned kinglets, American pipits, blue-headed vireos, western tanagers, Cassin's finches, gray-crowned rosy finches, pine siskins, red crossbills, green-tailed towhees, dark-eyed juncos, white-crowned sparrows, golden-crowned sparrows, fox sparrows, and Lincoln's sparrows. Long-toed salamanders, California giant salamanders, rough-skinned newts, tailed frogs, western toads, Pacific tree frogs, northern red-legged frogs, Oregon spotted frogs, pygmy short-horned lizards, common garter snakes, and northwestern garter snakes make up some of the amphibious and reptilian animals in the vicinity. Roughly half the lakes in the Jefferson area contain rainbow trout.

== Geology ==
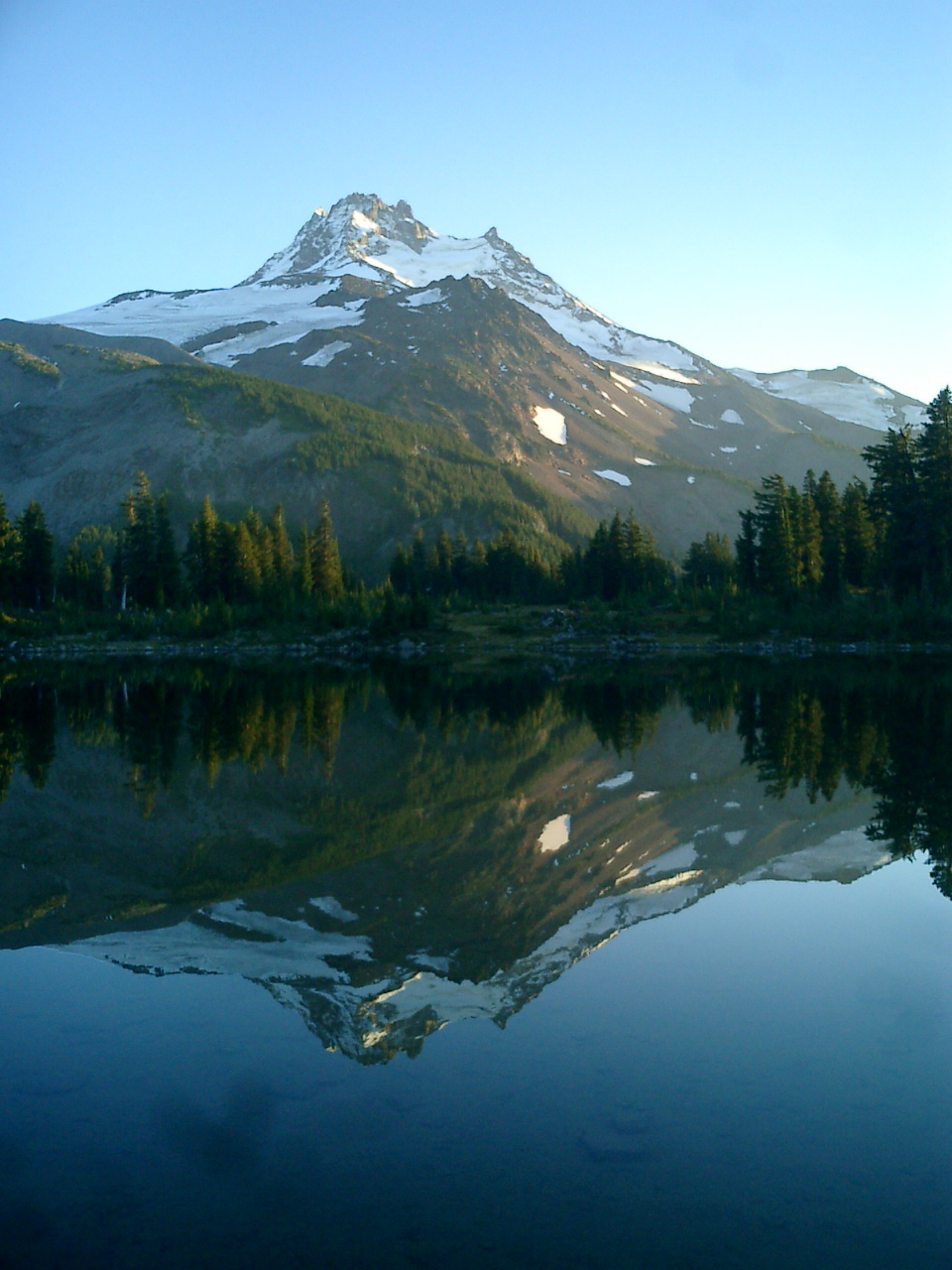
Mount Jefferson

Mount Jefferson shows normal magnetic polarity, suggesting that it formed less than 730,000 years ago. Created by the subduction of the oceanic Juan de Fuca tectonic plate under the continental North American tectonic plate in an area where the Earth's crust is 25 to 28 miles (40 to 45 km) thick, it is part of the Oregon High Cascades, which are influenced by the movement of the North American Plate and the extension of its continental crust. These extensional processes formed grabens, or valley-like depressions between parallel fault lines, at the eastern boundary of the central Cascades, including a 4,000-foot (1,200 m) deep formation. Jefferson does not lie in one of these grabens, but these tectonic processes continue, albeit at a less dramatic rate. At their peak rates, the crustal extension and depression of the Cascades area caused eruption of the Minto Lavas, made of basalt, followed by the Santiam basalts, named for their movement into the North Santiam River valley, which they filled to depths of 600 feet (180 m). Though the Jefferson vicinity has produced andesitic and dacitic lavas for the past 5 to 6 million years, major volcanoes more than 50 miles (80 km) south of the area have erupted basaltic andesite.

The central Oregon Cascades are made up of Eocene to Quaternary volcanic, volcaniclastic, igneous, and sedimentary rock. Miocene and Pliocene volcanic and sedimentary rocks have been exposed in the Jefferson area, which also sits above lava flows, cinder material, and breccia from the High Cascades that formed during and after the Pliocene. Jefferson is the largest volcano in the Jefferson Reach, which forms the 47-mile (75 km) strip that makes up the northern part of the Oregon Cascade Range. Stretching from Frog Lake Buttes to South Cinder Peak, this segment consists of at least 175 Quaternary volcanoes. With a width of 16 miles (25 km), it differs from the adjacent northern segment of the Cascades, where volcanoes show a scattered distribution. Other unusual features of the Jefferson Reach include that the northernmost 19 miles (30 km) of the strip does not contain many volcanoes formed since the early Pleistocene and that it features a number of andesitic and dacitic volcanoes, which are unlike the many mafic (rich in magnesium and iron) shield volcanoes within the stretch. North of Pinhead Buttes, the volcanoes in this region are older and less tall, usually between 3,600 to 4,900 feet (1,100 to 1,500 m) in elevation. South of Pinhead Buttes, the Cascades becomes younger Pleistocene volcanoes, which often have glaciers.

Mount Jefferson may form part of a long-lasting intracrustal melting and magma storage area that encompasses an area of 12.4 by 5.0 miles (20 by 8 km), where relatively little mafic eruptive activity has occurred. The melting of the metamorphic rocks amphibolite and at deeper strata, granulite, have both produced intermediate and silicic lavas at Jefferson. The strip may still be active, as monogenetic vents near Jefferson have produced basaltic andesite since the last glacial period. Jefferson — with Mount Hood, the Three Sisters-Broken Top area, and Crater Lake — represents one of four volcanic centers responsible for much of the Oregon Cascades' Quaternary andesite, dacite, and rhyolite deposits. Some of this andesite and dacite occurs in vents that underlie the Jefferson vicinity, which also erupted during the Quaternary. Quaternary volcanic production rates in the Cascade Range from Jefferson to Crater Lake have averaged 0.72 to 1.44 cubic miles (3 to 6 km^{3}) per mile of arc length per million years.

In the area surrounding Mount Jefferson, monogenetic volcanoes constructed an upland area composed of basaltic lava flows and small volcanic vents. Within this region, basaltic vents occur at Olallie Butte, Potato Butte, Sisi Butte, North Cinder Peak, and South Cinder Peak, with basaltic lava flows at Cabot Creek, Jefferson Creek, and upper Puzzle Creek. There are several hundred other basaltic volcanoes within the central Oregon High Cascades, extending up to 110 miles (180 km) away. Mount Jefferson overlies an silicic volcanic field from the early Pleistocene. Between five and six million years old, the field reaches north from Jefferson to Olallie Butte, and it covers an area of 58 square miles (150 km^{2}). Scientists think that the setup of this field, where various vents have erupted lava, explains why the otherwise similar Cascades volcano at Mount Hood is three times as voluminous as Jefferson, because Hood has concentrated most of the eruptions from its magma chambers. The field is also likely underlain by a batholith, a large mass of intrusive igneous rock (also called a pluton) that forms from cooled magma deep in the Earth's crust.

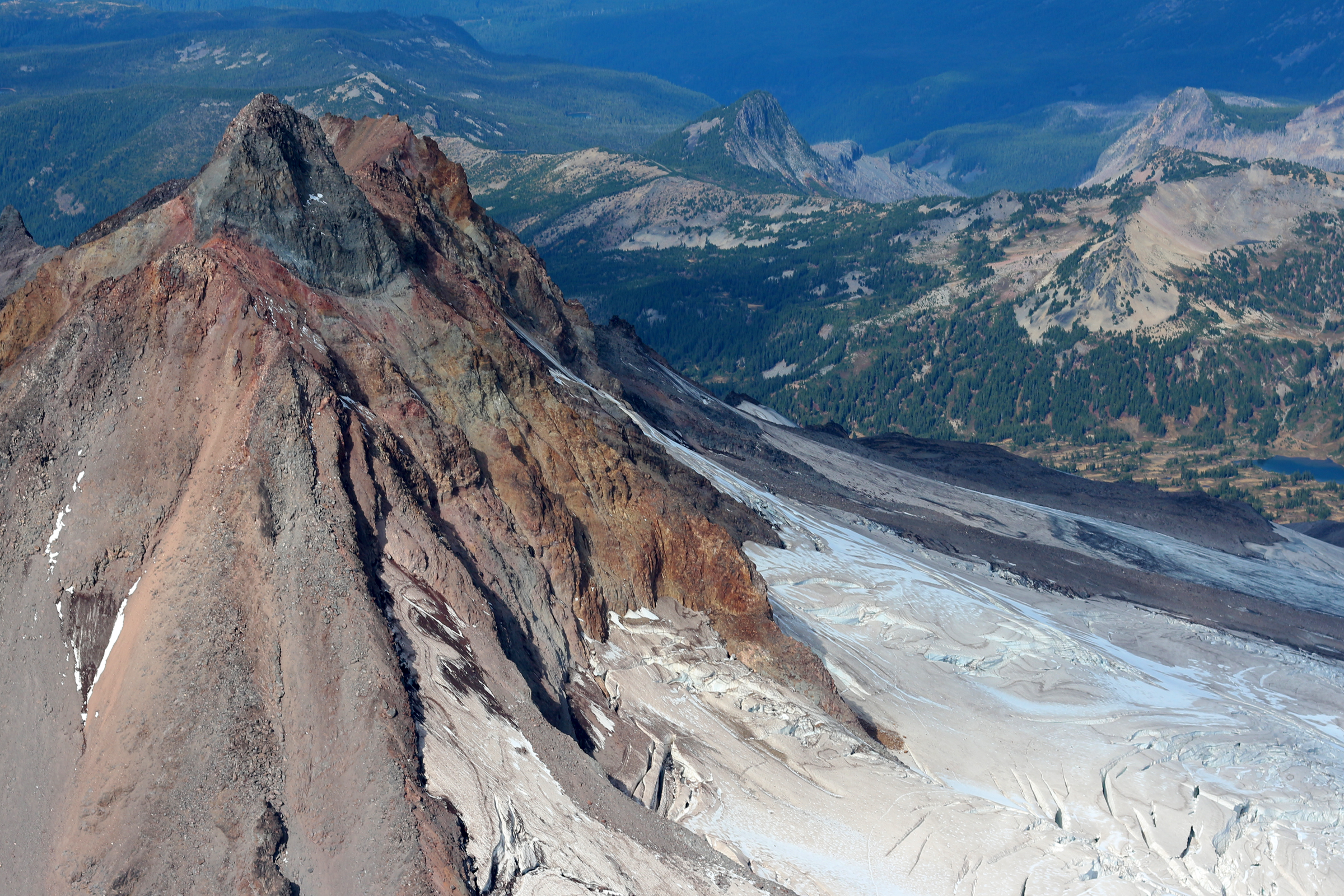
An aerial photo of the summit of Mt. Jefferson, October 2015

Mount Jefferson is a stratovolcano, made up of basaltic andesite, andesite, and dacite overlying basaltic shield volcanoes, with andesite and more silicic (rich in silica) rock forming the majority of the mountain. Rhyolite from the Quaternary can also be found at Jefferson, though it is not commonly found within the major volcanic centers of the Oregon Cascades. The volcano constitutes a small stratovolcano within the Cascades, with a current volume of 3.4 cubic miles (14 km^{3}), though prior to erosion and other alterations over time, it may have been as large as 7.2 cubic miles (30 km^{3}) in volume at one time. Mount Jefferson has been significantly altered by erosion, and represents one of the most eroded stratovolcanoes in the state of Oregon. Glacial motion during the Pleistocene decreased the summit's elevation by a few hundred feet and formed a cirque (an amphitheatre-like valley carved by glacial erosion) on the western side of the volcano. This feature, known as the West Milk Creek cirque, includes the two Milk Creek glaciers and extends into the interior of Mount Jefferson, exposing tephra and pyroclastic rock in the main volcanic cone. The final two advances of glaciers during the Pleistocene removed about a third of the volcano's original volume, decreasing the overall elevation by 1,000 feet (300 m). Currently, the Whitewater Glacier and the Milk Creek glaciers erode the mountain's eastern and western flanks, respectively, and are likely to gradually form a cleft between the northern and southern horns of the summit.

Within Jefferson's main volcanic cone, more than 200 andesitic lava flows are now exposed, with mean thicknesses from 10 to 35 feet (3.0 to 10.7 m), as well as an immense, pink dacitic lava flow with a thickness of 1,000 feet (300 m). The volcano also possess a small volcanic plug (created when magma hardens within a vent on an active volcano), situated 500 feet (150 m) under the summit. Jefferson's main cone ranges from 58 to 64 percent silicon dioxide, and is mostly made up of andesite and dacite. The upper 3,300 feet (1,000 m) of Jefferson's cone formed within the past 100,000 years, and consists mostly of dacite lava flows and lava domes. While it is possible that glaciers shed material from the burgeoning lava domes, any evidence of these domes generating pyroclastic flows or lahars has not been preserved in the geological record.

Basalt at Mount Jefferson contains olivine, clinopyroxene, and plagioclase phenocryst crystals, while basaltic andesite phenocrysts include plagioclase (variable among samples), clinopyroxene, olivine, orthopyroxene, and occasionally, magnetite. Dacite and rhyodacite samples show amphibole, plagioclase, orthopyroxene, clinopyroxene, magnetite, apatite, and every so often ilmenite. Andesite shows similar composition to dacite samples, though sodic plagioclases and amphiboles are not as common.

=== Subfeatures ===
Volcanic activity in the vicinity of Mount Jefferson tends to originate from either stratovolcanoes that erupt for thousands of years or monogenetic volcanoes, which only erupt for a brief period of time before going extinct. At least 35 volcanic vents can be detected within 9 miles (14 km) of the main volcanic cone at Mount Jefferson. These have produced andesitic and dacitic lava flows, lava domes, small shield volcanoes, and lava aprons. Basalt lava flows, at least two of which are younger than 7,700 years old, have been produced from four monogenetic volcanoes 4 to 8 miles (6.4 to 12.9 km) to the south of Jefferson, and they are not directly related to activity at the Mount Jefferson volcano. Rhyodacitic lava flows and pyroclastic material, which have since been significantly altered and stripped by glaciation, originated from eight vents in the area. The Mount Jefferson vicinity contains at least 40 of the 190 documented lava domes in the Oregon Cascades, including the 7,159-foot (2,182 m) tall Goat's Peak dome; it also contains monogenetic tuyas (flat-topped, steep-sided volcanoes formed when lava erupts through a thick glacier or ice sheet) and emplacements of hyaloclastite among mafic lava flows.

The area is full of cinder cone volcanoes and intrusive lava plugs, which occur in irregular patterns. Made up of red to gray cinders, some are loose and agglutinated, and some contain intrusive rock plugs, while others do not. Cinder cones south of Mount Jefferson erupted lava flows, such as Forked Butte and North Cinder Peak. About 1,000 years ago, the South Cinder Peak cinder cone erupted, generating a lava flow that reached Marion Lake. Other volcanic cones associated with Mount Jefferson include Forked Butte and Horseshoe Cone.

=== Eruptive history ===
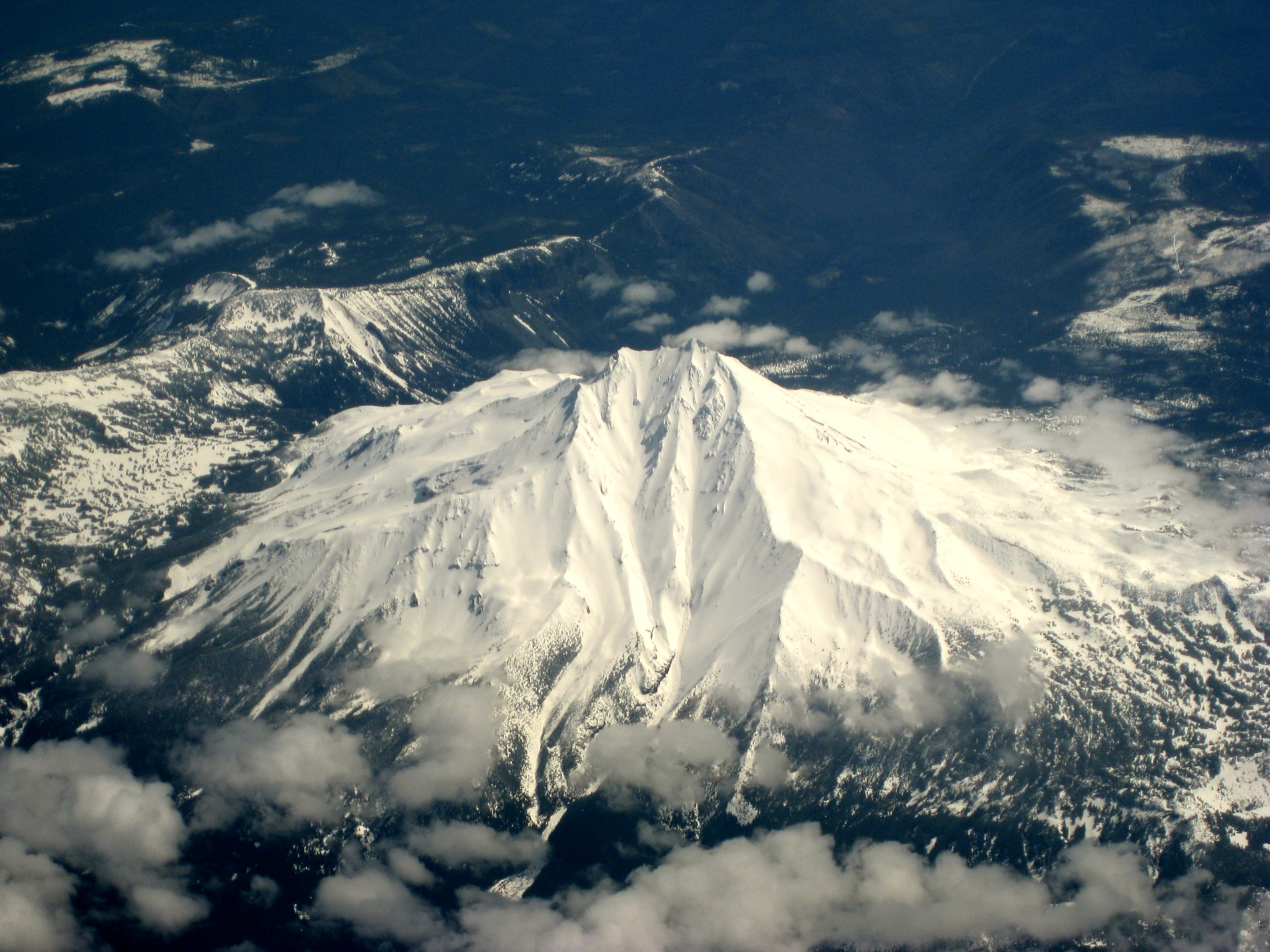
Mount Jefferson from above

Scientists lack a comprehensive record of activity at Mount Jefferson, as important details have been obscured by the erosion of deposits by large glaciers. A few eruptions have been documented from the deposits that have been preserved, but the broad outline of Jefferson's eruptive history is understood, including that its activity has changed over time, producing both powerful explosive eruptions and lava flows. Historically, eruptive activity has alternated between andesitic and dacitic lavas.

The volcano formed over the course of several eruptive episodes, beginning about 300,000 years ago with the formation of rocks on the western and southwestern flanks of the volcano, and lasting until roughly 15,000 years ago. The two major eruptive episodes were separated by glacial erosion of the volcano. At least during the past 700,000 years, eruptions at the volcano have produced andesitic and dacitic lava. Most of the volcano formed within the past 100,000 years, with the latest activity building the central volcanic cone taking place between 30,000 and 20,000 years ago. These eruptions took place amidst the last glacial period and indicate interaction of lava with ice. They erupted dacite lava flows and silicic lava domes from vents east of the former central cone, and were influenced by ice on Mount Jefferson, which prevented them from diffusing across the volcano's flanks. Instead, they formed lava tongues near the crater and coursed down spaces in between glaciers, creating volcanic glass and columnar joints, or arrays of prismatic shapes. Silicic lava domes from this eruptive episode collapsed over and over again, producing block-and-ash flows, or pyroclastic flows with many volcanic blocks among ash with a similar composition.

About 150,000 years ago, an eruption produced the volcanic rock in the Park Butte area. A huge explosive eruption took place between 100,000 and 35,000 years ago (scientists have been unable to create a more specific time frame for the event), producing ash layers that covered the Metolius and Deschutes River valleys and eventually extended to the city of Arco, in the southeastern part of the state of Idaho. This eruption may have excavated the existing crater, but if that were the case, eruptions have since refilled the area and obscured evidence of a crater-forming event. Eruptions around the same time period yielded pyroclastic flows that coursed down the Whitewater River drainage of the eastern side of Mount Jefferson, and the Whitewater Creek on the volcano's western flank.

Basaltic lava flows at Forked Butte and to the south of Bear Butte mark the newest lava flows in the Jefferson area, as both were produced after Mount Mazama erupted roughly 7,600 years ago.

The last eruption occurred about a thousand years ago at a cinder cone on the flank of the South Cinder Peak cone.

=== Recent activity and potential hazards ===
The basaltic lava flows produced from four monogenetic vents near Mount Jefferson indicate that the local region could produce future eruptions and could be considered active. Mount Jefferson itself is listed with a "Low/Very Low" threat potential by the United States Geological Survey, but the agency has noted that "it may be too soon to regard Mount Jefferson as extinct." In a 1987 report, Richard P. Hoblitt and other USGS scientists estimated that the yearly likelihood for a major explosive eruption at Jefferson does not exceed 1 in 100,000. However, given the incomplete geologic record, imprecise dating of its known deposits, and its lack of relatively recent activity, scientists from the United States Geological Survey have commented that "It is almost impossible to estimate the probability of future eruptions at Mount Jefferson." They have designated proximal and distal hazard zones for the volcano, which extend 5 to 10 miles (8.0 to 16.1 km) and several tens of miles, respectively.

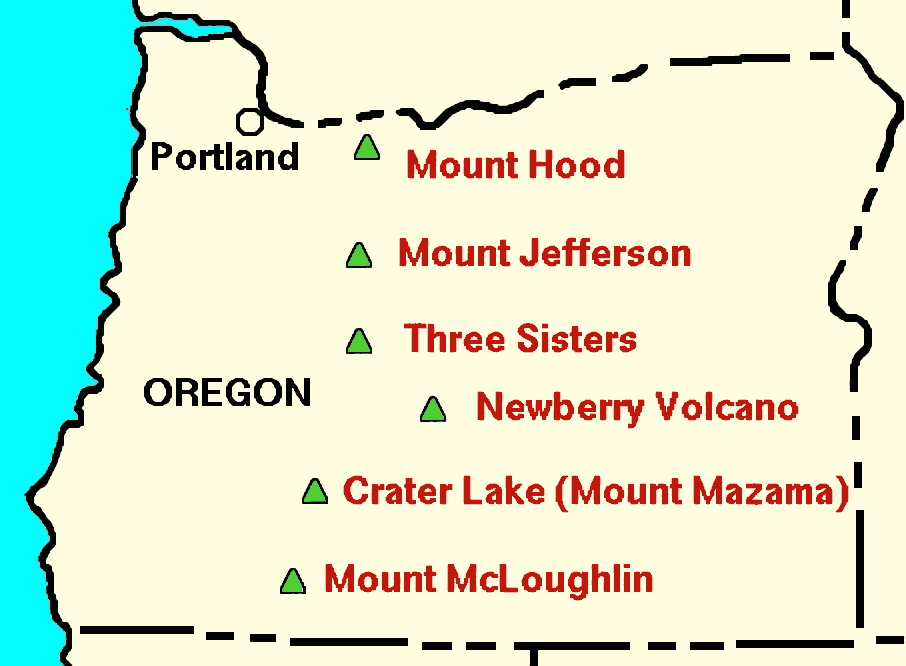
Jefferson's location in Oregon relative to other major volcanoes

An eruption from the volcano would threaten the immediate surrounding area, in addition to places downstream near river valleys or downwind that could be affected by ashfall. Lahars (volcanically induced mudslides, landslides, and debris flows) and tephra could extend far from the volcano, and Mount Jefferson may also produce pyroclastic flows, lava domes, and lava flows. Though the population within 19 miles (30 km) is only about 800 people, there are more than 550,000 people living within 62 miles (100 km) of the volcano.

Lava flows from Mount Jefferson or another volcano nearby might form lava domes that could collapse, also yielding pyroclastic flows. Moreover, while basaltic lava flows from surrounding monogenetic vents tend to travel slowly and typically only reach 12 miles (19 km) from their source, and therefore would not pose serious hazards to much wildlife or humans, they would still burn and bury anything they encountered. Mazama Ash in the region reached 4 to 6 inches (100 to 150 mm) in thickness, and at least one explosive eruption from Jefferson deposited 6 feet (1.8 m) of ash onto its surroundings within 12 miles (19 km). Finer ash particles from the volcano could threaten air traffic, as a large gas plume may form; clouds from such a plume might also spawn pyroclastic flows on the flanks of the Jefferson volcano. Moreover, ash can cause irritation of the eyes or respiratory system among the ill, the elderly, and infants, potentially leading to chronic lung disease. Tephra can also lead to the short-circuiting of electric transformers and power lines, collapse roofs, clog engine filters, damage car engines, and create clouds capable of producing lightning that can start fires. Even monogenetic volcanoes in the area could yield hazardous ashfall, reaching 10 feet (3.0 m) in thickness in areas within 1.2 miles (1.9 km); it is unlikely they would threaten areas outside the local Jefferson vicinity.

An eruption at Jefferson could create lahars that would reach Detroit Lake on the western side of the volcano or Lake Billy Chinook on the eastern side, leading to increased lake water levels (or lake dam failure) and endangering life downstream. In addition to the hazards from eruptions at Mount Jefferson, other safety threats include debris avalanches and lahars, which could be caused without an eruption as a result of the failure of glacial moraine dams; this has happened in the past at Jefferson. Even a small or mid-sized landslide could create lahars that travel far from the volcano. Flooding at one of the many lakes on the flanks of Jefferson could spawn lahars in the future. Many scientists think mudflows represent the largest threat at Jefferson.

Seismic activity at Mount Jefferson is monitored by a regional network of seismic meters operated by the United States Geological Survey at the University of Washington's Geophysics Department. No frequent signs of detectable earthquake have been seen within the past two decades, but if earthquakes increased, scientists are prepared to deploy additional seismometers and other tools to monitor volcanic gas emissions and ground deformation indicating movement of magma into the volcano.

== Human history ==
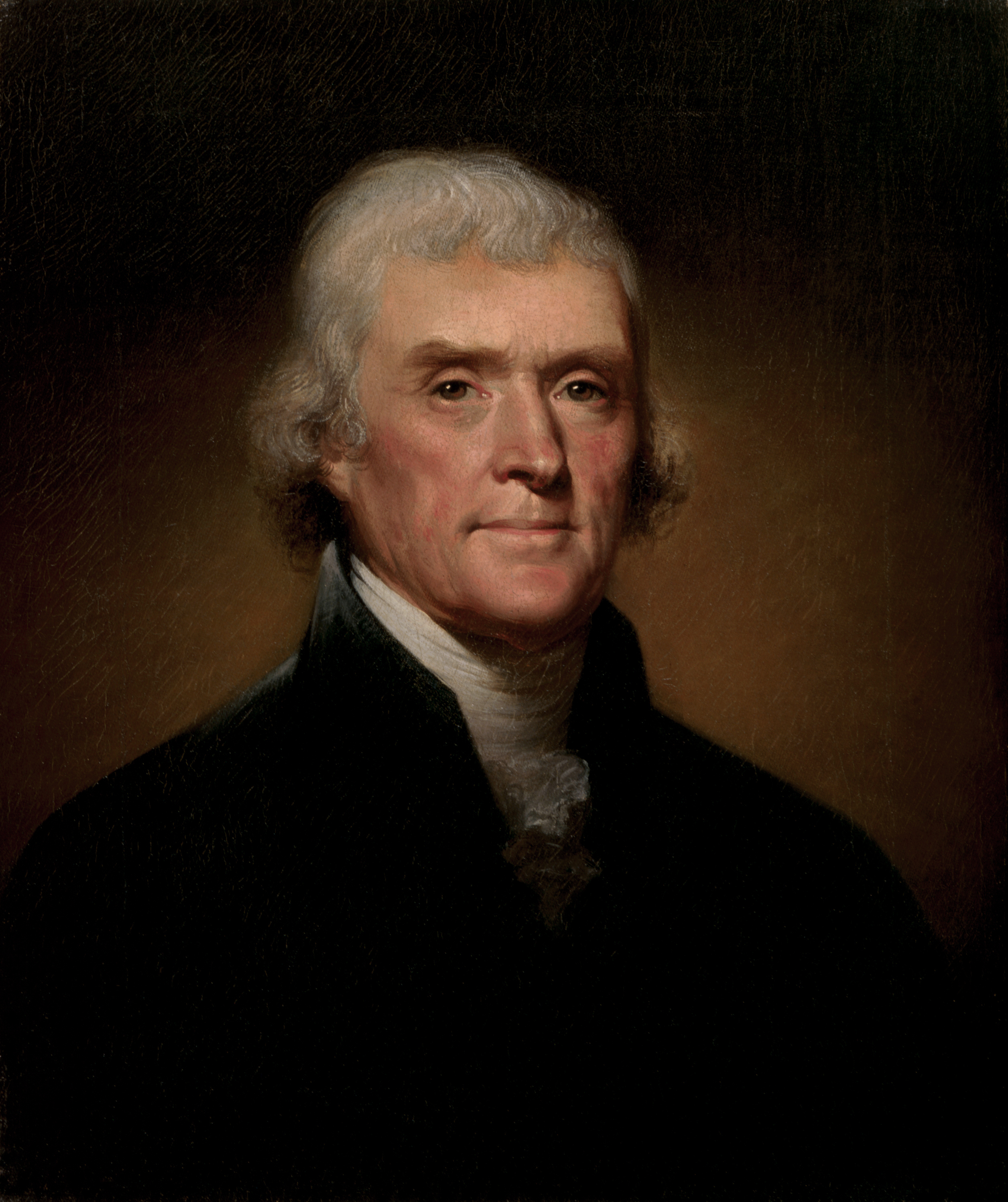
Mount Jefferson was named after the third President of the United States, Thomas Jefferson (pictured; painted in 1800 by Rembrandt Peale)

A Native American name for the mountain is Seekseekqua; its English name, Mount Jefferson (originally called Mount Vancouver by the British) was decided in honor of U.S. President Thomas Jefferson by the Lewis and Clark Expedition. The expedition, which was sponsored by President Jefferson, first saw the peak from the mouth of the Willamette River on March 30, 1806. Walter Eaton later described Mount Jefferson as "the most remote, the most inaccessible and alluring" mountain in Oregon, writing that Jefferson and Mount Hood "seem to hold mystic converse with one another over the canyons between."

Mount Jefferson's glaciers were named by Oregon Bureau of Mines scientist Ira A. Williams in 1915, with former professor of geology at the University of Oregon, Edwin T. Hodge, publishing a report on the volcano's glaciers and geology in 1925. His report focused on the sequence of volcanic rocks at Jefferson, in addition to its physiography and glaciology. Aerial photographic surveys of the glaciers at Jefferson were conducted by the Mazamas, a hiking club from Portland, during the 20th century. In 1937, Thayer analyzed Mount Jefferson's petrography and petrology from segments of the Western Cascades and High Cascades, which he separated into local units. He expanded on this research in a 1939 publication looking at Jefferson vicinity lava flows. Field work followed in summer during 1965, led by G. W. Walker, and a 1974 study of the volcano's glacial and volcanic history was carried out by Kenneth G. Sutton and other geologists.

The first ascent of Mount Jefferson was probably accomplished by E. C Cross and Ray L. Farmer on 12 August 1888 by way of the south ridge. George J. Pearce, who accompanied Cross and Farmer on the expedition, wrote an account of the climb for the Oregonian newspaper on 22 August 1900. The first climber to reach the summit via the north face was S. S. Mohler in 1903.

== Recreation ==
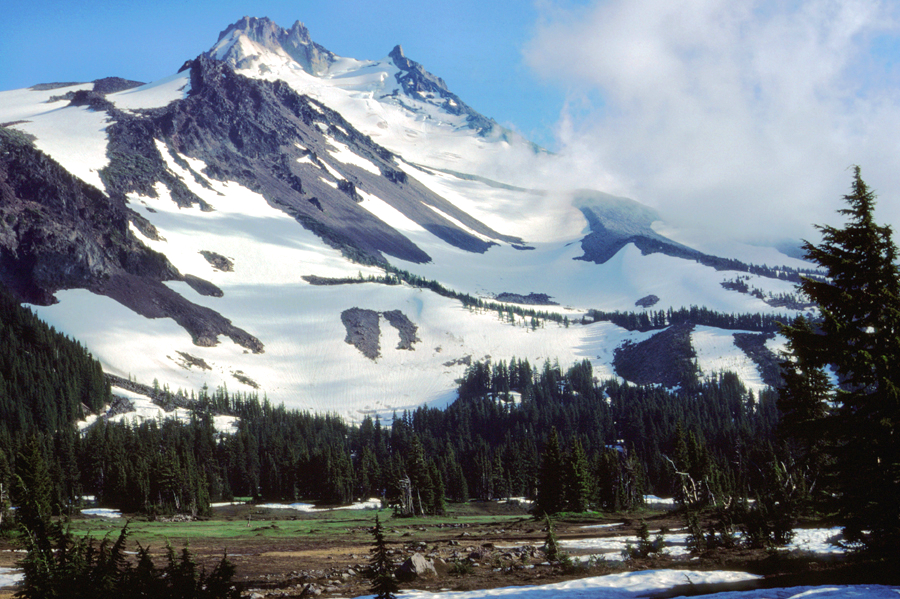
Mount Jefferson from the Mount Jefferson Wilderness area

Mount Jefferson is remote, and can usually only be reached on foot or by horse. There are no paved roads within 4 miles (6.4 km) of the mountain, and it is relatively little-known compared to other features near the Willamette Valley. Still, the mountain and its surrounding wilderness are visited by so many hikers, backpackers, and climbers each year, especially during the summer, that they face threats to their ecological well-being. The Warm Springs Tribal Council does not permit access to the volcano's eastern side, so only the western flanks can be used by the public. The western side can be reached from the Oregon Route 22 highway.

Jefferson Park, on the northern slope of the mountain, can be reached on foot by taking the Whitewater Trail and following the Pacific Crest Trail for 1 mile (1.6 km). Located within the Mount Jefferson Wilderness, it represents a popular tourist destination for its views, lakes, and meadows, with activities including backpacking, climbing, and hiking during the summer, as well as nature photography. The area contains 26 campsites, which enforce a maximum group size of 12 people, and do not allow campfires. As a result of increased traffic to the area between 2012 and 2014, the Willamette National Forest administration enforced a campsite reservation system as of 2016, but stopped the practice in 2017 due to its failure to reduce human impact within the region.

The Jefferson Lake Trail runs for 4.2 miles (6.8 km) round trip, with an elevation gain of 400 feet (120 m). Parts of the Trail were destroyed by a fire in the wilderness area in 2003, but the surviving remnants of the trail reopened after maintenance work was completed. At Marion Lake, there are several trails, including a 6 miles (9.7 km) long route and a hike to Marion Mountain that lasts 11.2 miles (18.0 km) round-trip. These and other trails through the region offer views of the devastation of fires in the wilderness area in 2003 and 2006. The Whitewater Trail runs north through the wilderness area for 1.5 miles (2.4 km) before reaching a junction, with the right path moving 2.5 miles (4.0 km) to the Pacific Crest Trail. In the Maxwell trail area, hikes of all difficulty levels can be found, including the challenging Maxwell Butte Trail 3391, the 9-mile (14 km) round trip at Santiam Lake Trail 3491, and the slightly less demanding 6.6-mile (10.6 km) Duffy Lake Trail 3427. At the Pamelia Lake trail area, there are streams, lakes, and springs, as well as bathrooms, parking areas, and picnic tables. The Pamelia Limited Entry Area only allows 20 groups per day and limits their size to mitigate human impacts on the wilderness. Trails at Pamelia Lake include the Hunts Creek Trail 3440 and a segment of the Pacific Crest Trail, in addition to the Pamelia Lake Trail 3439, which rises 800 feet (240 m) before meeting the Hunts Creek Trail. The area is popular for backpacking, mountaineering, horseback riding, and day hiking. Other popular trails include the Firecamp Lakes Trail and Canyon Creek Meadows trails. In addition to the trails, some of the most popular areas around Mount Jefferson Wilderness include Eight Lakes Basin, Pamelia Lake, Jack Lake, Duffy Lake, Russell Lake, Santiam Lake and Wasco Lake.

Mount Jefferson can be climbed, but the route is challenging, especially the pinnacle of the summit. Nearly annually, at least one climber attempting Jefferson perishes. Because of the hazards and difficulty of climbing Mount Jefferson, the U.S. National Geodetic Survey recommends that only experienced climbers try to climb it.

== See also ==
- Cascade Volcanoes
- Geology of the Pacific Northwest

== Sources ==
- Conrey, R. M.; Hooper, P. R.; Larson, P. B.; Chesley, J.; Ruiz, J. (July 10, 2001). "Trace element and isotopic evidence for two types of crustal melting beneath a High Cascade volcanic center, Mt. Jefferson, Oregon". Contributions to Mineralogy and Petrology. 141 (6). Springer Science+Business Media: 710–732. Bibcode:2001CoMP..141..710C. doi:10.1007/s004100100259. S2CID 129641404.
- Franklin, J. F.; Moir, W. H.; Douglas, G. W.; Wiberg, C. (Summer 1971). "Invasion of Subalpine Meadows by Trees in the Cascade Range, Washington and Oregon". Arctic, Antarctic, and Alpine Research. 3 (3). Institute of Arctic and Alpine Research (University of Colorado Boulder): 215–224. doi:10.2307/1550194. JSTOR 1550194.
- Greene, R. C. (1968). Petrography and petrology of volcanic rocks in the Mount Jefferson area, High Cascade Range, Oregon: Bulletin 1251-G. United States Government Publishing Office.
- Harris, S. L. (2005). "Chapter 14: Mount Jefferson". Fire Mountains of the West: The Cascade and Mono Lake Volcanoes (Third ed.). Missoula, Montana: Mountain Press Publishing Company. pp. 201–210. ISBN 0-87842-511-X.
- Hildreth, W. (2007). Quaternary Magmatism in the Cascades, Geologic Perspectives. United States Geological Survey. Professional Paper 1744. Archived from the original on March 25, 2019.
- Hoblitt, R. P.; Miller, C. D.; Scott, W. E. (1987). Volcanic Hazards with Regard to Siting Nuclear-Power Plants in the Pacific Northwest: Open-File Report 87-297. United States Geological Survey.
- McArthur, Lewis A.; McArthur, Lewis L. (2003) [1928]. Oregon Geographic Names (Seventh ed.). Portland, Oregon: Oregon Historical Society Press. ISBN 0-87595-277-1.
- McBirney, A. R.; Sutter, J. F.; Naslund, H. R.; Sutton, K. G.; White, C. M. (December 1, 1974). "Episodic Volcanism in the Central Oregon Cascade Range". Geology. 2 (12). Geological Society of America: 585–589. Bibcode:1974Geo.....2..585M. doi:10.1130/0091-7613(1974)2<585:EVITCO>2.0.CO;2.
- Morris, E.; Jewell, J.; Morris, M.; McRae, B. (2007). Moon Handbooks Oregon (7th ed.). Emeryville, California: Avalon Travel. ISBN 978-1566919302.
- O'Connor, J. E.; Hardison III, J. H.; Costa, J. E. (2001). Debris Flows from Failures of Neoglacial Age Moraine Dams in the Three Sisters and Mount Jefferson Wilderness Areas, Oregon: U.S. Geological Survey Professional Paper 1606. Reston, Virginia: United States Geological Survey.
- Sherrod, D. R.; Smith, J. G. (2000). Geologic Map of Upper Eocene to Holocene Volcanic and Related Rocks of the Cascade Range, Oregon: U.S. Geological Survey Geological Investigations Series I-2569 (Map). Archived from the original on January 10, 2017.
- Wahclellaspirit (2012). The Majestic Columbia River Gorge: A Journey Treasured Throughout Time. Xlibris. ISBN 9781479758838.
- Walder, J. S.; Gardner, C. A.; Conrey, R. M.; Fisher, B. J.; Schilling, S. P. (1999). Volcano Hazards in the Mount Jefferson Region, Oregon: Open-file Report 99-24. United States Geological Survey.
- Voth, E. (June 1963). A Survey of the Vertebrate Animals of Mount Jefferson, Oregon (Thesis). University of Oregon.
- Wuerthner, G. (2003). Oregon's Wilderness Areas: The Complete Guide. Big Earth Publishing.
