= John W. Minto =

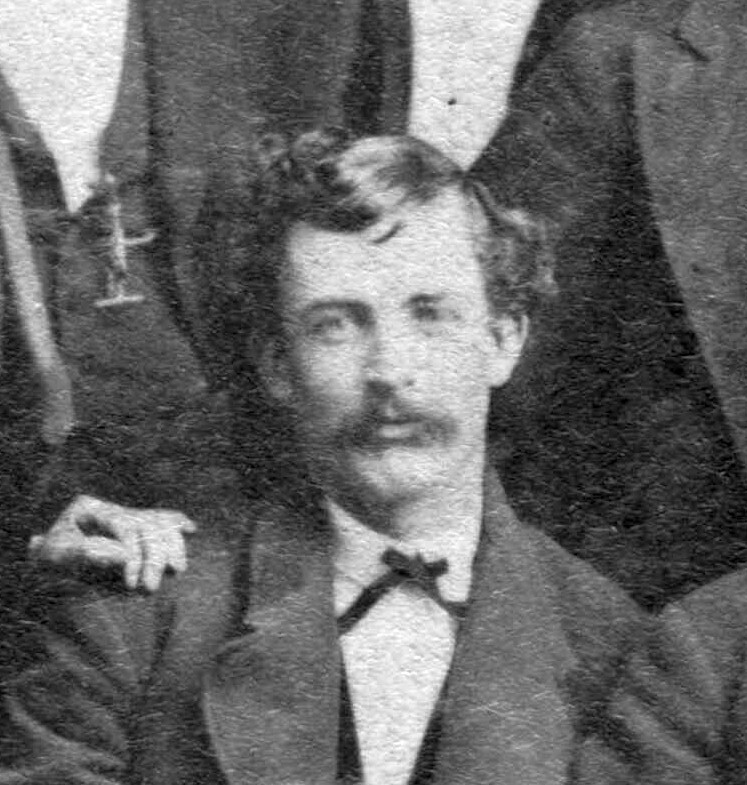
Minto in 1870

John Wilson Minto was a law enforcement officer in the U.S. state of Oregon. He served as sheriff of Marion County in the 1880s and as chief of the Portland Police Bureau in the 1890s. His father, John Minto IV, was a well known Oregon pioneer and politician, and his brother Harry Minto was head of the Oregon Department of Corrections. In his memoirs, Oregon governor Oswald West related a story in which Minto, while serving as sheriff, averted a bank robbery in progress.

Minto was born in about 1848 and died in 1926. He was a graduate of Willamette University. His youngest daughter, Lena May, died at age 15.
