= John Minto (Oregon pioneer) =

American politician

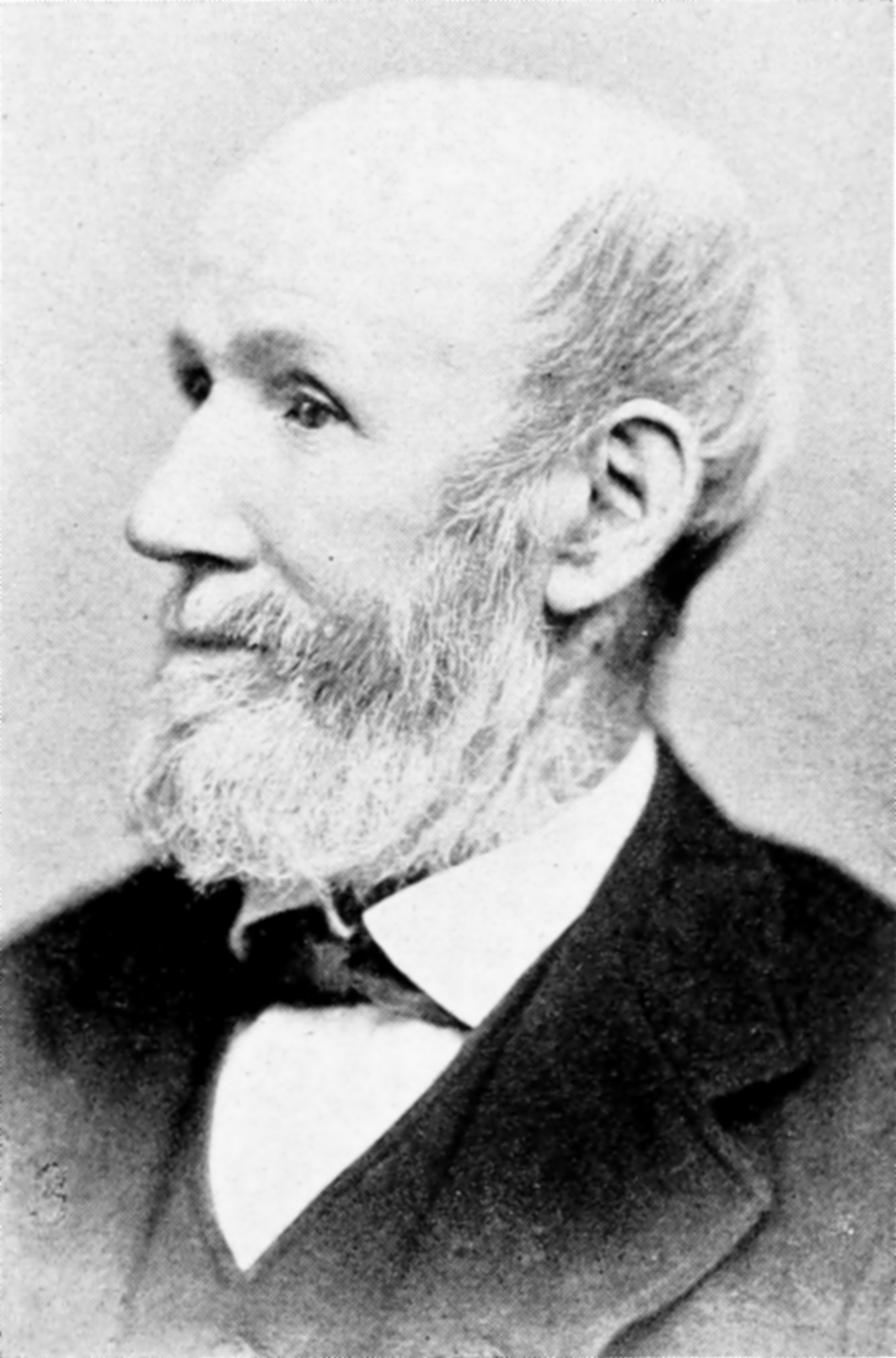

Member of the Oregon House of Representatives
- In office 1862, 1868, 1880, and 1890
- Constituency: Marion County

Personal details
- Born: October 10, 1822 Wylam, England
- Died: February 25, 1915 (aged 92) Salem, Oregon, U.S.
- Party: Republican
- Spouse: Martha Ann Morrison
- Occupation: sheep rancher

John Minto IV (October 10, 1822 – February 25, 1915) was an American pioneer born in Wylam, England. He was a prominent sheep farmer in the U.S. state of Oregon and a four-time Republican representative in the state legislature. Minto also volunteered for the militia during the Cayuse War and years later helped locate Minto and Santiam passes through the Cascade Mountains east of Salem, Oregon.

== Early life ==
His father, John Minto III, was a coal miner and a gunsmith in England, with family roots tracing back to Scotland. His siblings were Margaret, Mary, William, Jane, Annie, Robert, Isabell, and Sarah. The Minto family immigrated to the United States in 1840, sailing on the ship Rocious which arrived in New York City on June 26, 1840. In 1848 part of the family immigrated to Iowa, including the father. The father died in 1855 on a ship while traveling to Oregon to meet his son.

The younger Minto began working at age eight and until 22 worked in the coal mines. In 1844 Minto left Pittsburgh and moved to Oregon, crossing the plains with the Gilliam company. This was after deciding not to go to Iowa when he reached St. Louis. Instead he went to Saint Joseph, Missouri, to head for Oregon Country. On this journey he would meet his future wife, and traveled with future Oregon politician Nathaniel Ford and later general, during the Cayuse Wars, Cornelius Gilliam in the same party.

== Oregon ==
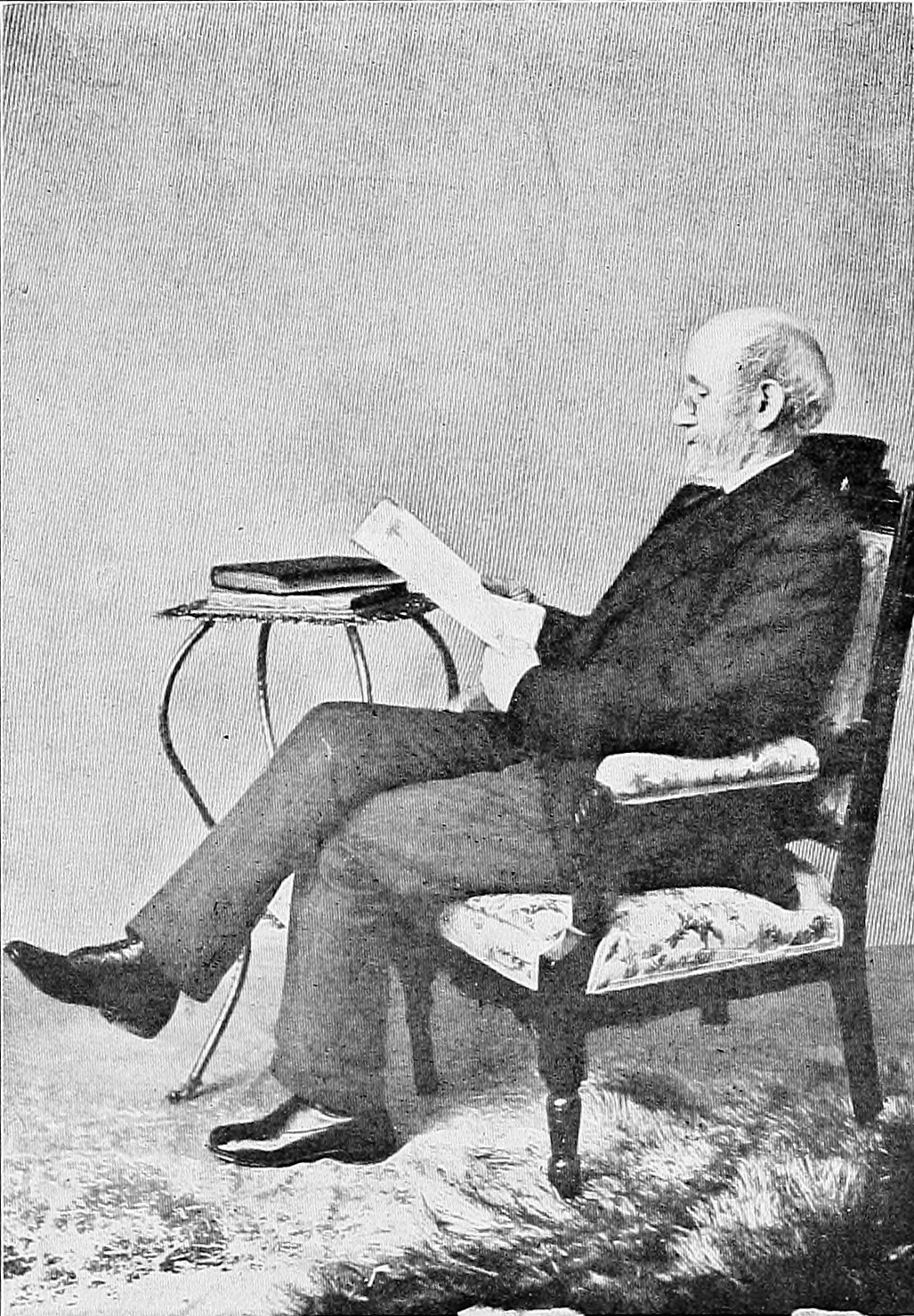

Minto arrived in Oregon City on October 18, 1844. In early 1845 went to The Dalles to drive the cattle of Captain R.W. Morrison to the Willamette Valley, Morrison being part of the group that Minto had emigrated with. Prior to this journey, Minto had traveled to Fort Vancouver to get assistance from Doctor John McLoughlin of the Hudson's Bay Company. However, doctor McLoughlin was out and they first dealt with James Douglas, McLoughlin’s later replacement as Chief Factor. Douglas put Minto and company up for the night, and the next day McLoughlin gave Minto some provisions for the journey to The Dalles and a boat to use. Once in The Dalles, Minto assisted the other travelers in his party who had been stranded there due to winter, and drove the cattle to the Willamette Valley.

He married July 8, 1847, to Miss Martha Ann Morrison, the daughter of Captain Morrison. Martha was born December 17, 1831, in Montgomery County, Missouri. The couple had eight children together: John Wilson, Mary, Robert, William Jasper, Irwin, Douglas, Harry Percy, and May. May died as an infant and only three survived their long-lived father.

In Oregon, Minto began working for Peter H. Burnett making cedar rails, before logging for a sawmill. Then in 1845 he purchased the original Methodist Mission claim at Mission Bottom from David Carter, and began farming. He then sold that property and took up a donation land claim four miles (6.4 km) south of Salem where he set up orchards and began sheep farming. Minto became a prominent sheep farmer and was selected as the secretary for the state agricultural society. He purchased the island property that bears his name (at 44.925953°N 123.062875°W) in 1867 and put it to use in agriculture. During the Cayuse War that started after the Whitman Massacre in 1847, Minto joined the volunteer army of pioneers that went east to battle the Native Americans. Then following the discovery of gold in California, he traveled south and spent a season in the gold mines before returning with some gold to use in financing his agricultural enterprise.

== Political career ==
John Minto was a member of the Republican Party. In 1862, he was elected to the Oregon House of Representatives to serve Marion County. He won additional terms in the House in 1868, 1880, and 1890. He later served on the State Board of Horticulture after appointment by Governor Lord.

== Later years ==
In 1873, John Minto was appointed by the county to determine if there was a pass through the Cascades east of Salem as had been rumored by accounts of trappers. Minto located the pass, which was named after him, and supervised the construction of a trail. Then, from information he received from John B. Waldo of the Oregon Supreme Court, Minto surveyed a lower pass seven miles (11 km) further south in 1882, now known as Santiam Pass. Part of the group for this survey was Captain L. S. Scott, who had been in charge of Fort Hoskins during part of the Civil War. The Oregon Pacific Railroad began construction over the pass, but encountered financial difficulties and was never completed. The western approach to Minto Pass is now Forest Service Trail #3471, which connects with the Pacific Crest Trail a 0.4 miles (0.64 km) east via a difficult trail. The area is now contained in the Mount Jefferson Wilderness.

John Minto died in Salem on February 25, 1915, at the age of 92. He was buried at Salem Pioneer Cemetery. Minto-Brown Island Park in Salem is partly on Minto's former farm.

== Works authored ==
- The Number and Condition of the Native Race in Oregon When First Seen by White Men, Oregon Historical Quarterly (1900)
- "Reminiscences of Honorable John Minto, Pioneer of 1844" . Oregon Historical Quarterly. II. 1901.
- "Minto Pass: Its History, and an Indian Tradition" . Oregon Historical Quarterly. IV. 1903.
- "What I know of Dr. McLoughlin and how I know it" . Oregon Historical Quarterly. XI. W.H Leeds, State Printer: 192. 1911.

== See also ==
- Marion Lake
