= Russell Glacier =

Russell Glacier may refer to:

- Russell Glacier (Greenland)
- Russell Glacier (Oregon), in Cascade Range, Mount Jefferson, Oregon, USA
- Russell Glacier (Mount Rainier), in Cascade Range, Mount Rainier, Washington, USA
