= Mount Jefferson Wilderness =

Protected area in Oregon, United States

- IUCN category Ib (wilderness area)
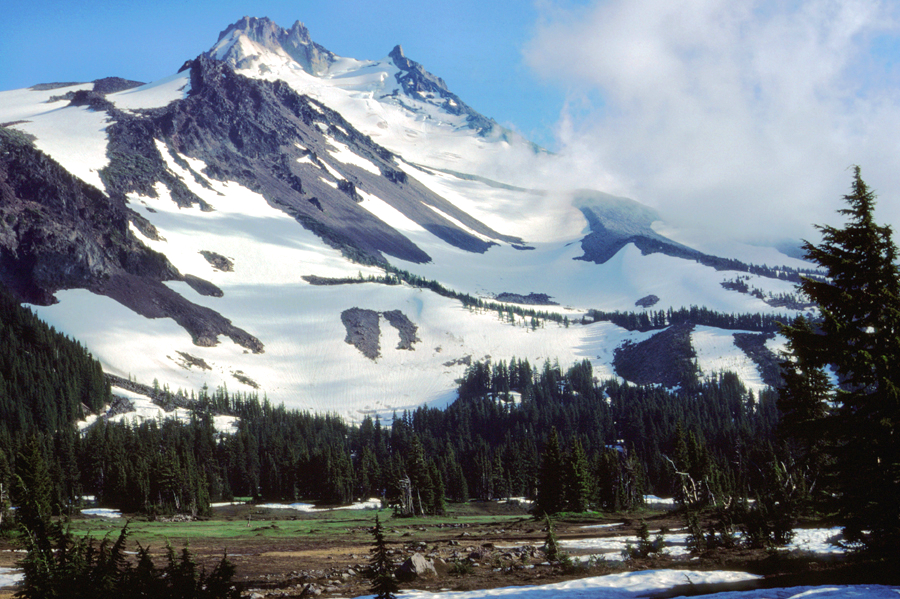
- Jefferson Park Meadows, Mount Jefferson Wilderness

- Location within the United States
- Location: Linn / Jefferson / Marion counties, Oregon, United States
- Nearest city: Sisters, Oregon
- Coordinates: 44°40′31.05″N 121°47′54.40″W
- Area: 111,177 acres (449.9 km^{2})
- Established: 1968
- Governing body: United States Forest Service

The Mount Jefferson Wilderness is a wilderness area located on and around Mount Jefferson in the central Cascade Range of Oregon in the United States. The wilderness lies within the Willamette National Forest and Deschutes National Forest. The wilderness area covers 111,177 acres (449.92 km^{2}), with more than 150 lakes. It also has 190 miles (310 km) of trails, including 40 miles (64 km) of the Pacific Crest National Scenic Trail. Three Fingered Jack and Mount Jefferson are both prominent features of the wilderness area. Mount Jefferson Wilderness is the second most visited Oregon wilderness area after the Three Sisters Wilderness.

== Geography ==
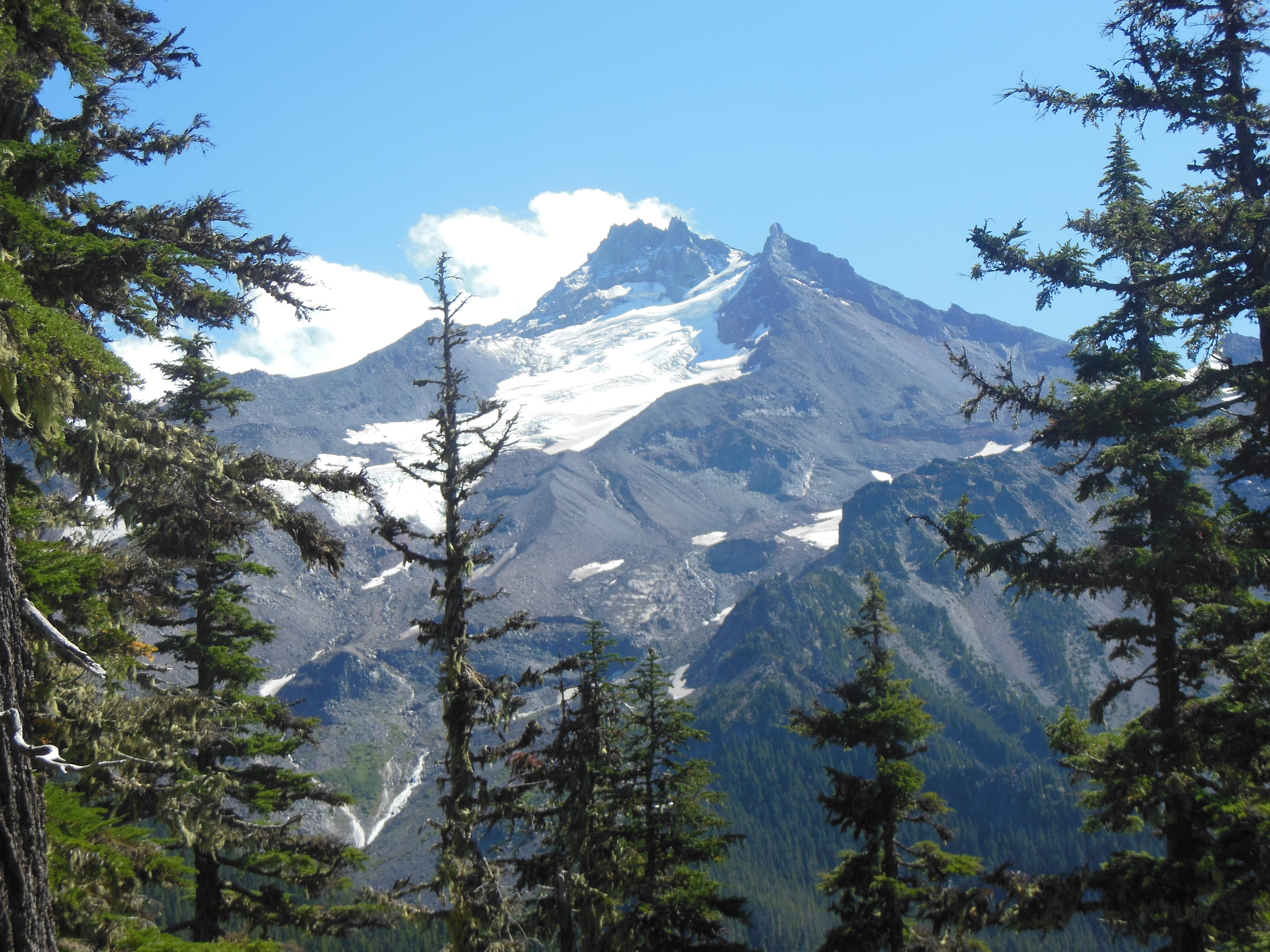
The Jefferson Park Glacier on the mountain's northwest face

At 10,497 feet (3,199 m), Mount Jefferson is the second tallest mountain in Oregon. It is a stratovolcano with slopes mantled by five glaciers - Whitewater, Waldo, Milk Creek, Russell, and Jefferson Park. Three Fingered Jack is a heavily eroded and deeply glaciated shield volcano and consists mainly of basaltic andesite lava. At 7,841 feet (2,390 m), it is made up of the solidified lava plug flanked by ridges of the old volcano's subsidiary lava dikes and lies at the southern end of the Mount Jefferson Wilderness. Other geographic features of the wilderness include steep talus slopes, rock outcrops, and alpine meadows.

Several lakes are situated within the wilderness area, including Marion Lake, Duffy Lake, Santiam Lake and Wasco Lake. Between Three Fingered Jack and the North Sister volcano and among recently active basalt lava fields, there is an array of cinder cones encompassing an area of 85 square miles (220 km^{2}).

== Vegetation ==
Vegetation in Mount Jefferson Wilderness is predominantly Douglas-fir, Pacific silver fir, sub-alpine fir, mountain hemlock, lodgepole pine, ponderosa pine, several species of false cedars including, Alaska-cedar, incense cedar, and western redcedar as well as species such as vine maple, huckleberry and rhododendron. Lupine, red paintbrush, bear grass, and various species of lily are also common in the wilderness.

== Wildlife ==
Common wildlife found in Mount Jefferson Wilderness include deer, black bear, coyotes, cougars, mountain goats and bald eagles. The Wilderness also includes Marion Lake, which is a breeding location for amphibians such as the rough-skinned newt. Roughly half the lakes in the Mount Jefferson Wilderness area contain rainbow trout.

== Recreation ==
Common recreational activities in Mount Jefferson Wilderness include hiking, backpacking, camping, cross-country skiing, wildlife watching, and mountain climbing on Mount Jefferson and Three Fingered Jack. There are some 190 miles (310 km) of trails in the wilderness, including a 40-mile (64 km) stretch of the Pacific Crest Trail.

== See also ==
- List of Oregon Wildernesses
- Camp Pioneer
- Whitewater Fire
