= Whitewater River (Oregon) =

- Location of the mouth of Whitewater River in Oregon

Location
- Country: United States
- State: Oregon
- County: Jefferson

Physical characteristics
- Source: Mount Jefferson
  - location: Whitewater Glacier, Warm Springs Indian Reservation
  - coordinates: 44°40′56″N 121°47′05″W
  - elevation: 7,847 ft (2,392 m)
- Mouth: Metolius River
  - coordinates: 44°40′10″N 121°32′45″W
  - elevation: 2,218 ft (676 m)
- Discharge
  - location: 7.5 miles (12.1 km) from the mouth
  - average: 84.2 cu ft/s (2.38 m^{3}/s)
  - minimum: 28 cu ft/s (0.79 m^{3}/s)
  - maximum: 2,320 cu ft/s (66 m^{3}/s)

The Whitewater River is a tributary of the Metolius River in the U.S. state of Oregon. It flows generally east from Whitewater Glacier on Mount Jefferson, west-southwest of Warm Springs in Jefferson County. The river descends from 7,847 feet (2,392 m) at the source to 2,218 feet (676 m) at the mouth. The stream lies entirely within the Warm Springs Indian Reservation.

== See also ==
- List of rivers of Oregon
