= Milk Creek Glacier (Oregon) =

Glacier in Oregon, United States

- Location within Oregon
- Type: Mountain glacier
- Location: Cascade Range, Linn County, Oregon, U.S.
- Coordinates: 44°40′27″N 121°48′08″W
- Terminus: Moraines/Talus
- Status: Retreating

Milk Creek Glacier is in the U.S. state of Oregon. The glacier is situated in the Cascade Range on the west slope of Mount Jefferson. Milk Creek Glacier is situated at an elevation between 10,000 and 9,200 ft (3,000 and 2,800 m). Milk Creek Glacier is considered stagnant ice and is located immediately west and below the summit of Mount Jefferson.

== See also ==
- List of glaciers in the United States
