= Russell Glacier (Oregon) =

Glacier in Oregon, United States

- Location within Oregon
- Type: Mountain glacier
- Location: Cascade Range, Linn County and Marion County, Oregon, United States
- Coordinates: 44°41′07″N 121°49′00″W
- Length: .75 mi (1.21 km)
- Terminus: Moraines/Talus
- Status: Retreating

Russell Glacier is in the U.S. state of Oregon. The glacier is situated in the Cascade Range on the northwest slopes of Mount Jefferson. Russell Glacier is situated at an elevation between 8,500 and 7,200 ft (2,600 and 2,200 m).

== See also ==
- List of glaciers in the United States
