= Whitewater Glacier =

Glacier in Oregon, United States

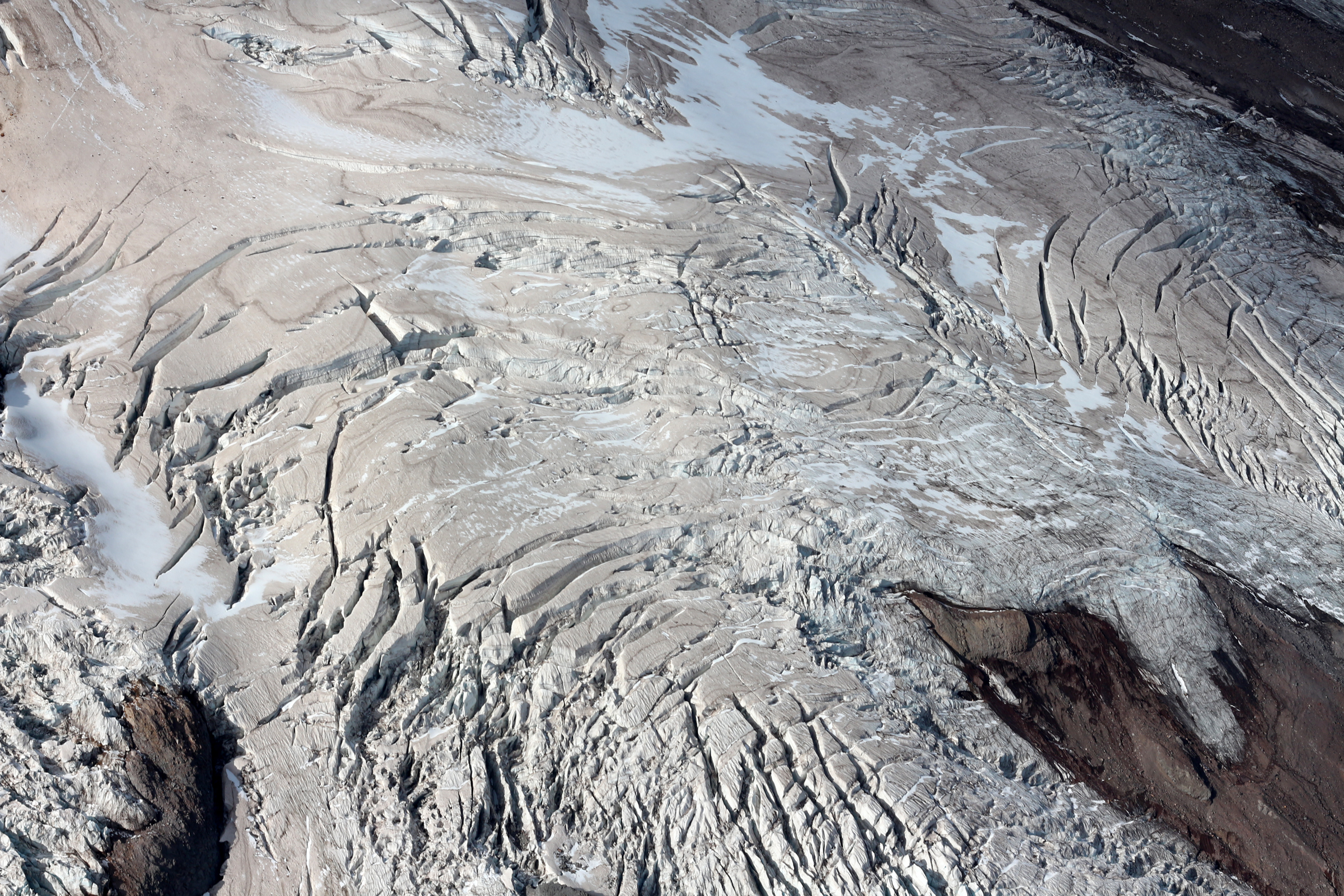
- Whitewater Glacier on Mount Jefferson, Oregon

- Location within Oregon
- Type: Mountain glacier
- Location: Cascade Range, Jefferson County, Marion County, Oregon, U.S.
- Coordinates: 44°40′53″N 121°47′27″W
- Length: .6 mi (0.97 km)
- Terminus: Moraines/Talus
- Status: Retreating

Whitewater Glacier is in the U.S. state of Oregon. The glacier is situated in the Cascade Range on the east and northeast slopes of Mount Jefferson. Starting near the summit at an elevation over 10,000 ft (3,000 m), the glacier extends down to 7,500 ft (2,300 m). From north to south, the glacier is nearly 2 mi (3.2 km) wide.

== See also ==
- List of glaciers in the United States
