= Harry Minto =

Superintendent of the Oregon State Penitentiary from 1914 to 1915

- Minto in 1908
- Born: October 16, 1864; Salem, Oregon
- Died: September 27, 1915 (aged 50) near Albany, Oregon
- Occupation: Law enforcement

Harry Percy Minto (October 16, 1864 – September 27, 1915) was the superintendent of the Oregon State Penitentiary in the U.S. state of Oregon from 1914 until his death in 1915. Minto died in the line of duty, killed by an escaped inmate.

== Early life ==
Harry Minto was born in Salem, Oregon, in 1864, the son of Oregon pioneer John Minto. In 1890, Minto was married to Jessie Glenn (1870 Salem, Oregon – 1956 Tampa, Florida). Minto was chief of police for the Salem, Oregon police department from 1891 to 1895 and he served two terms as the Marion County sheriff. He was elected sheriff in 1908, and served through 1913. His older brother, John Wilson Minto, was previously the sheriff as well as chief of police in Portland.

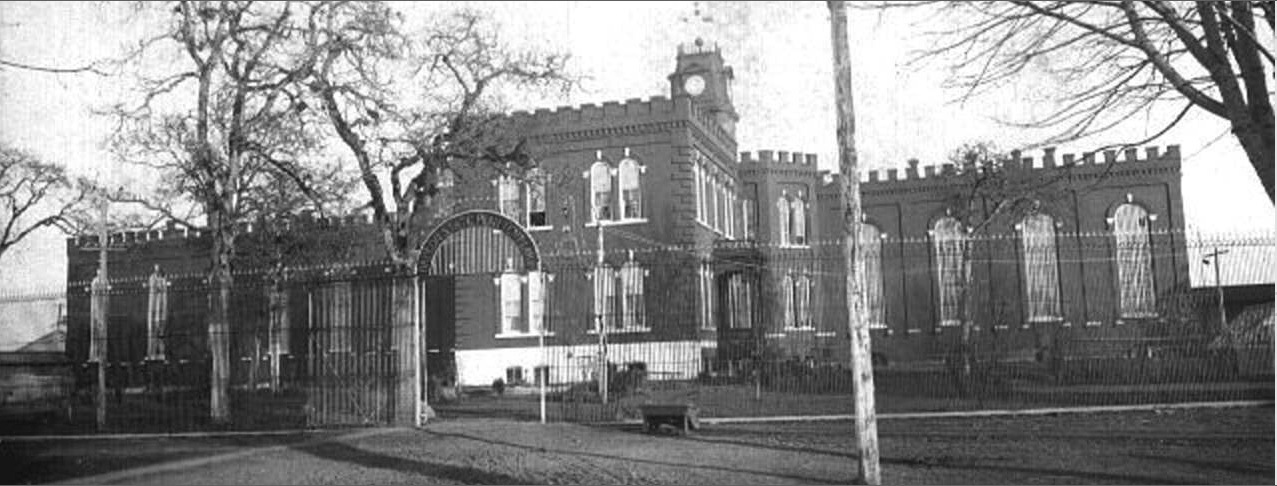
Oregon State Penitentiary in 1892

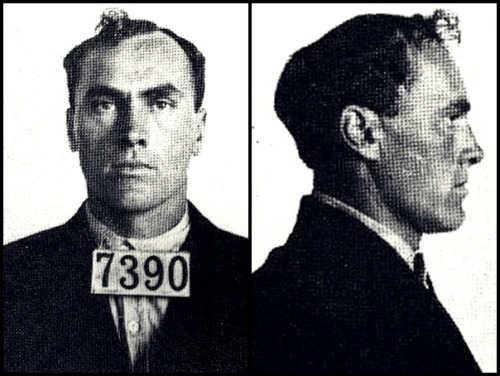
Carl Panzram's alias "Jeff Baldwin" 1915 mugshot at the Oregon State Penitentiary

In 1914, Minto was appointed as the superintendent of the Oregon State Penitentiary by governor Oswald West. He replaced Berton K. Lawson, who had been involved in the events at Copperfield, Oregon early that year. As warden, he supervised the infamous serial killer Carl Panzram, in June 1915, when Panzram still was in his early twenties and before his known murderings.

== Death ==
Warden Harry Minto believed in harsh treatment of inmates, including beatings and isolation, among other disciplinary measures. On September 27, 1915, inmate Otto Hooker escaped from a work gang at the prison and Minto was one of many law enforcement personnel who went searching for the escaped prisoner. After Hooker shot and wounded one law enforcement officer, Minto caught up with Hooker near Albany around 11:30 pm. There Minto challenged Hooker, and Hooker shot Minto in the head, killing him instantly. Hooker was mortally wounded the next day during capture. Minto's remains were cremated in Portland, Oregon. Hooker's accomplice, Carl Panzram, was executed in 1930 for killing a prison employee at the United States Penitentiary, Leavenworth.

== See also ==
- Michael Francke, director of Oregon Department of Corrections, killed in line of duty in 1989.
