= Wasco Lake =

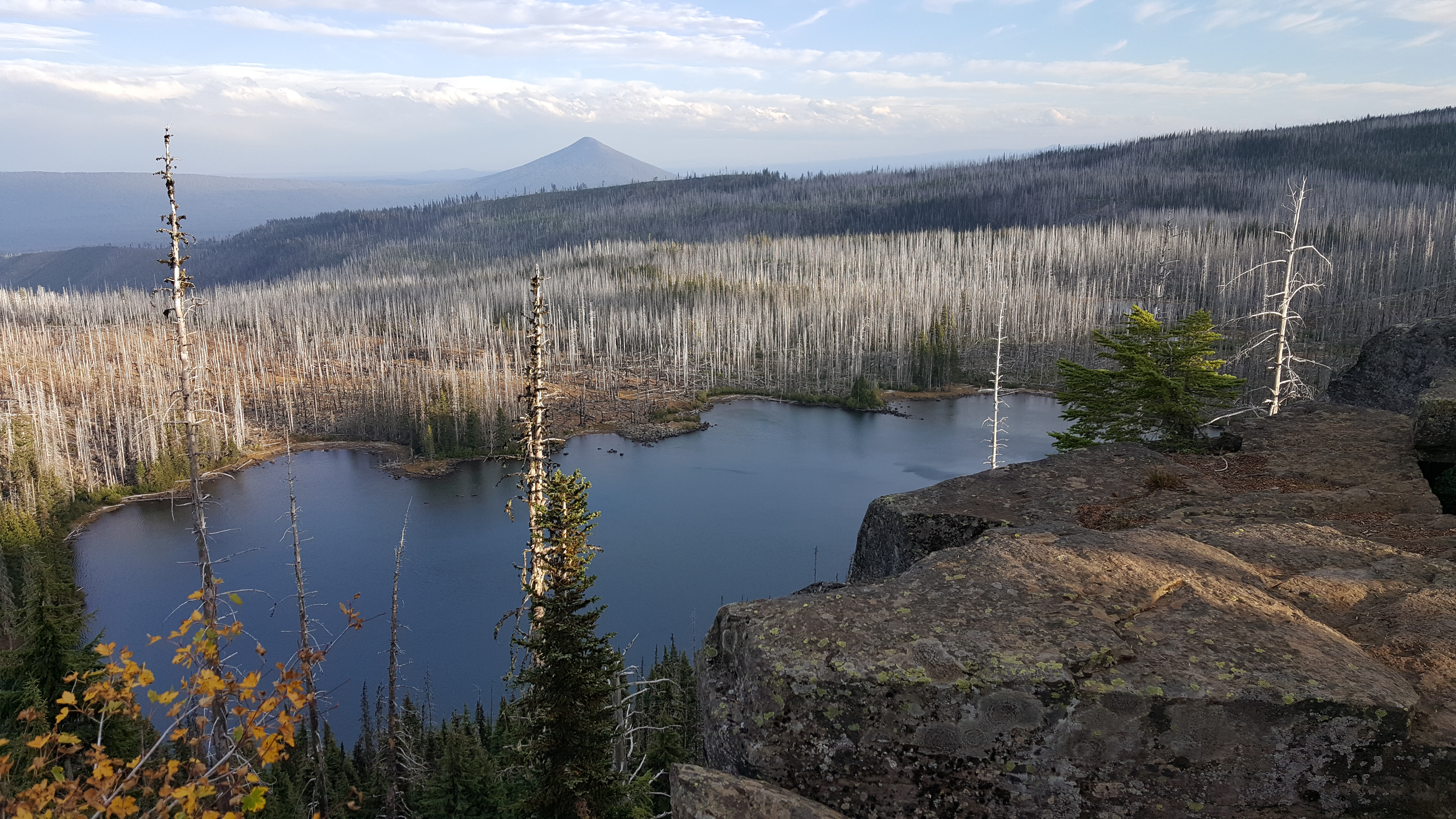
- Wasco Lake viewed from Pacific Crest Trail

- Location within Oregon Location within the United States
- Location: Jefferson County, Oregon
- Coordinates: 44.5098669°N 121.8117282°W
- Type: Natural alpine lake
- Basin countries: United States
- Surface area: 17.3 acres (7.0 ha)
- Shore length^{1}: .6 mi (0.97 km)
- Surface elevation: 5,115 ft (1,559 m)
- ^{1} Shore length is not a well-defined measure.

Wasco Lake is a glacially formed alpine lake located in Jefferson County, Oregon, United States. A part of the Mount Jefferson Wilderness Area, Wasco Lake is a popular hiking destination and can be accessed via the Pacific Crest Trail.

In 2003, the devastating B&B Complex Fire hit the area of Wasco Lake.

== Location ==
Wasco Lake is located at an elevation of 5,115 ft (1,559 m) on the eastern slope of Three Fingered Jack in the Cascade Mountain Range and is a part of the Mount Jefferson Wilderness Area.
