= Red paintbrush =

List of plants with the same or similar names

Red paintbrush is a common name for two species of plant and may refer to:

- Castilleja coccinea, from eastern North America
- Castilleja miniata, largely from western North America
