= Jefferson Park Glacier =

Glacier in Oregon, United States

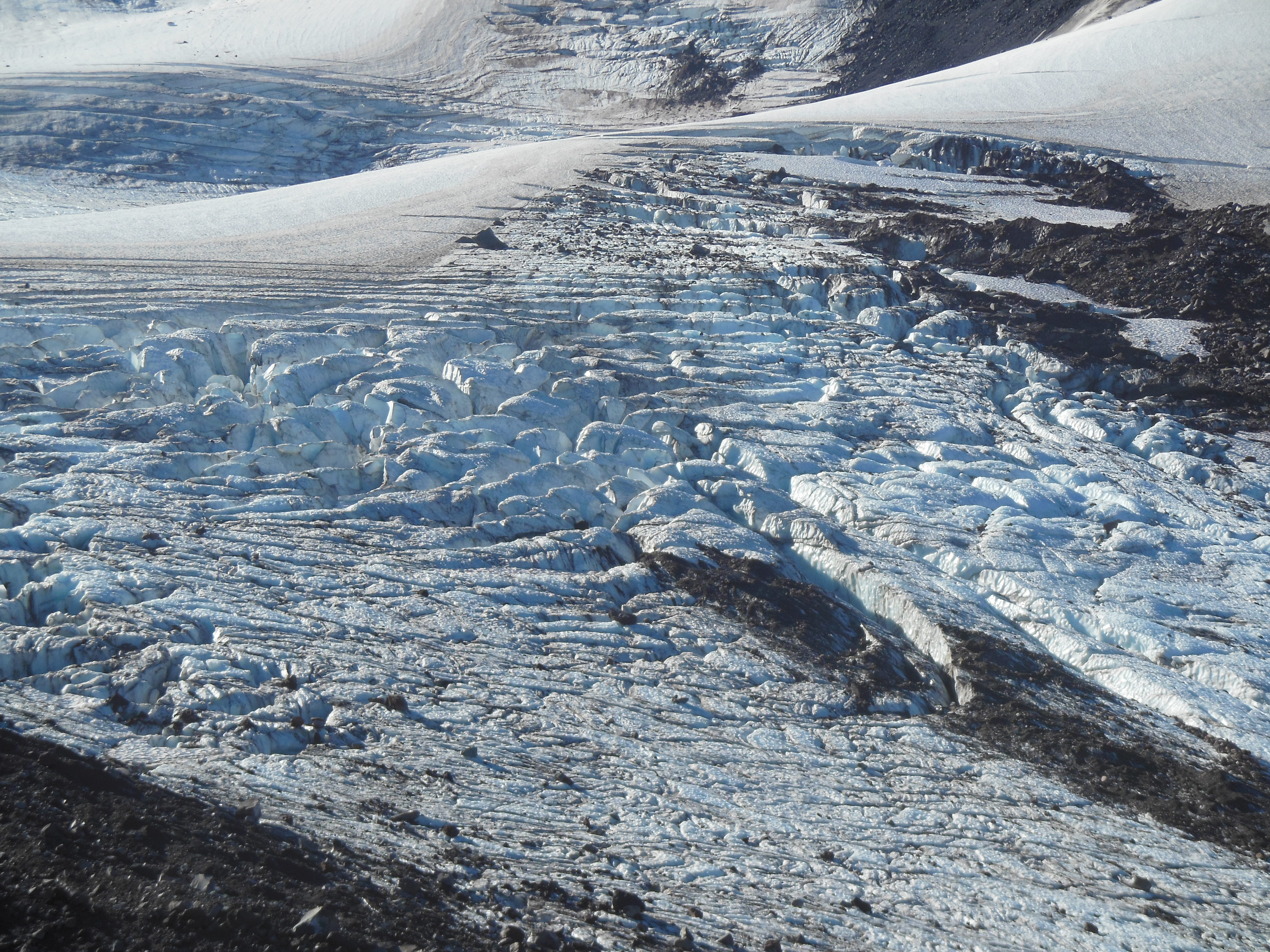
- Jefferson Park Glacier

- Location within Oregon
- Type: Mountain glacier
- Location: Cascade Range, Linn and Marion counties, Oregon, U.S.
- Coordinates: 44°41′04″N 121°48′23″W
- Length: 0.9 mi (1.4 km)
- Terminus: Moraines/Talus
- Status: Retreating

Jefferson Park Glacier is located in the U.S. state of Oregon. The glacier is situated in the Cascade Range on the northwest slopes of Mount Jefferson. Jefferson Park Glacier is situated at an elevation between 7,700 and 9,500 ft (2,300 and 2,900 m).

== See also ==
- List of glaciers in the United States
