= Marion Lake (Oregon) =

Lake in Oregon, United States

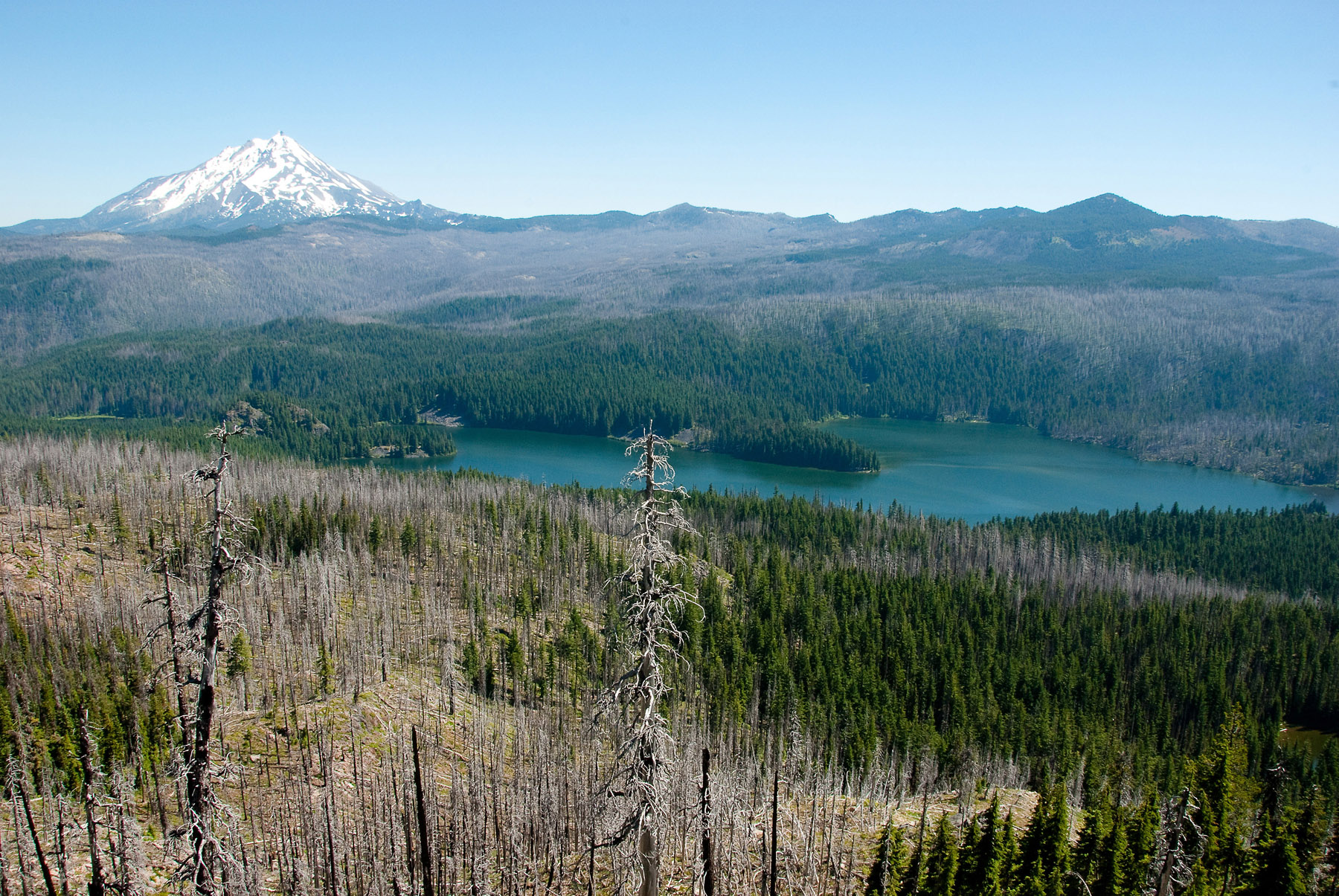

- Location within Oregon Location within the United States
- Location: Linn County, Oregon, United States
- Coordinates: 44.556508°N 121.862009°W
- Basin countries: United States
- Surface area: 300 acres (1.2 km^{2})
- Surface elevation: 4,134 ft (1,260 m)

Marion Lake is a subalpine lake located in Linn County of the U.S. state of Oregon. The lake is in central Oregon's Cascades within the Mount Jefferson Wilderness. The lake is approximately 300 acres (1.2 km^{2}), at an elevation of 4,134 feet (1,260 m).

It is the largest lake in an Oregon wilderness area and the largest lake not accessible by automobile. With the exception of large Waldo Lake, it is the largest natural lake in the Willamette National Forest on the west slope of the Central Cascade Range.

Marion Lake was named in 1874 by John Minto's Marion County road-viewing party in 1874. Marion County, in turn, had been named for General Francis Marion of Revolutionary War fame.

It is the headwaters of Marion Creek, a tributary of the North Santiam River.

The rough-skinned newt (Taricha granulosa) is found at Marion Lake during the amphibian's breeding season.

== See also ==
- List of lakes in Oregon
