= Mink (disambiguation) =

Mink is a group of semi-aquatic furry mammals.

Mink may also refer to:

== Entertainment ==
- mink (director) or Christopher Morrison, American film director and graphic novel writer
- Mink (singer) (born 1984), Japanese-Korean singer
- Madboy/Mink, Indian musical duo, consisting of Saba Azad and Imaad Shah
- Mink (comics), a character in the Marvel Comics series Squadron Supreme
- Mink (manga), a manga series by Megumi Tachikawa
- Mink, protagonist of the manga Dragon Half
- The Mink Tribe, a race of anthropomorphic, furry mammals in One Piece

== Geography ==
- Mink Lake (Lane County, Oregon)
- Mink River, a freshwater estuary in Door County, Wisconsin
- MINK, a territory band comprising Minnesota, Iowa, Nebraska, and Kansas
- Mink, Louisiana, the last town in America to get phone service
- Mink Brook, a tributary of the Connecticut River
- Mink Peak, a mountain in Antarctica
- Mink Lake (disambiguation)
- Mink Creek (disambiguation)

== People ==
- Mink Stole (born 1947), American actress
- Mink Nutcharut (formally Nutcharut Wongharuthai, born 1999), a Thai female professional snooker player
- Mink (surname), A list of people with the surname "Mink"

== Other uses ==
- USS Mink (IX-123), an American navy vessel
- Mink Building, in the Harlem/Manhattanville neighborhood of New York City
- Mink frog, a small species of frog native to the United States and Canada
- Sea mink, an extinct North American member of the family Mustelidae
- Mink (HBC vessel), operated by the HBC from 1872-1904, see Hudson's Bay Company vessels
