= French Pete Creek =

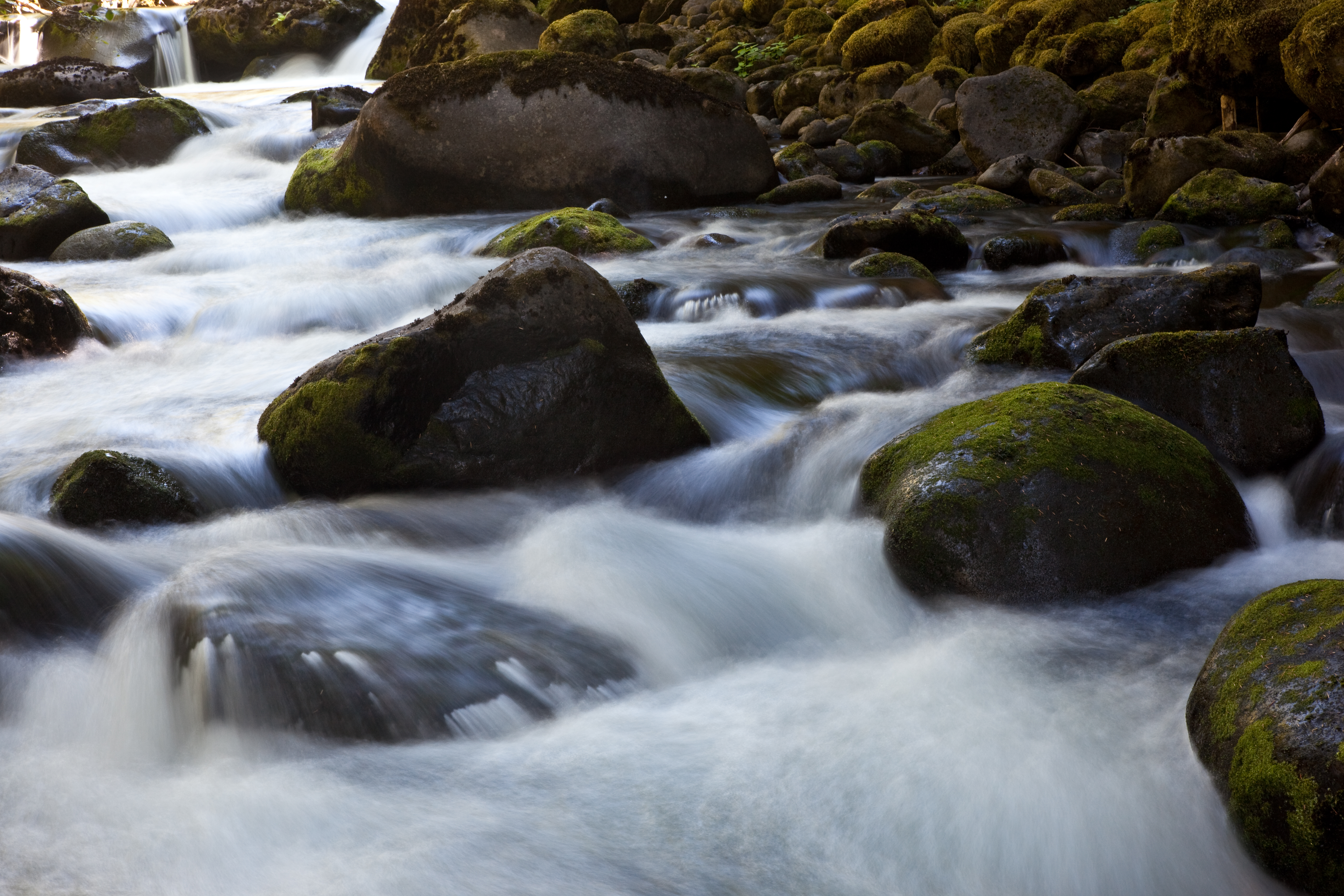
- French Pete Creek

- Location of the mouth of French Pete Creek in Oregon
- Etymology: Shepherd who grazed his flock along the creek

Location
- Country: United States
- State: Oregon
- County: Lane

Physical characteristics
- Source: Three Sisters Wilderness
  - location: Cascade Range
  - coordinates: 43°59′11″N 122°00′13″W
  - elevation: 4,823 ft (1,470 m)
- Mouth: South Fork McKenzie River
  - location: French Pete Campground, Cougar Reservoir
  - coordinates: 44°02′28″N 122°12′27″W
  - elevation: 1,791 ft (546 m)

French Pete Creek is a tributary of the South Fork McKenzie River in Lane County, in the U.S. state of Oregon. It flows generally west through the Three Sisters Wilderness to the south end of Cougar Reservoir, about 11 miles (18 km) from the larger river's confluence with the McKenzie River. The creek has two named tributaries—Olallie Creek and, further downstream, Pat Creek—both of which enter from the right.

The stream derives its name from an early-day shepherd who grazed his flock along the valley. The shepherd's last name is unknown.

French Pete Trail, which crosses the stream twice, runs along the creek's valley. The trail begins near French Creek Campground, at the confluence of the creek with the river. Campground amenities include 17 tent, car, and trailer sites, picnic tables, vault toilets, and drinking water. The campground is generally open from early April to mid-September.

In the 1970s, environmentalists and timber interests clashed over a "substantial stand of young timber with a high potential value at maturity" along the creek, according to Oregon Geographic Names. In 1978, most of the French Pete Creek valley was added to the Three Sisters Wilderness.

== See also ==
- List of rivers of Oregon
