= South Fork McKenzie River =

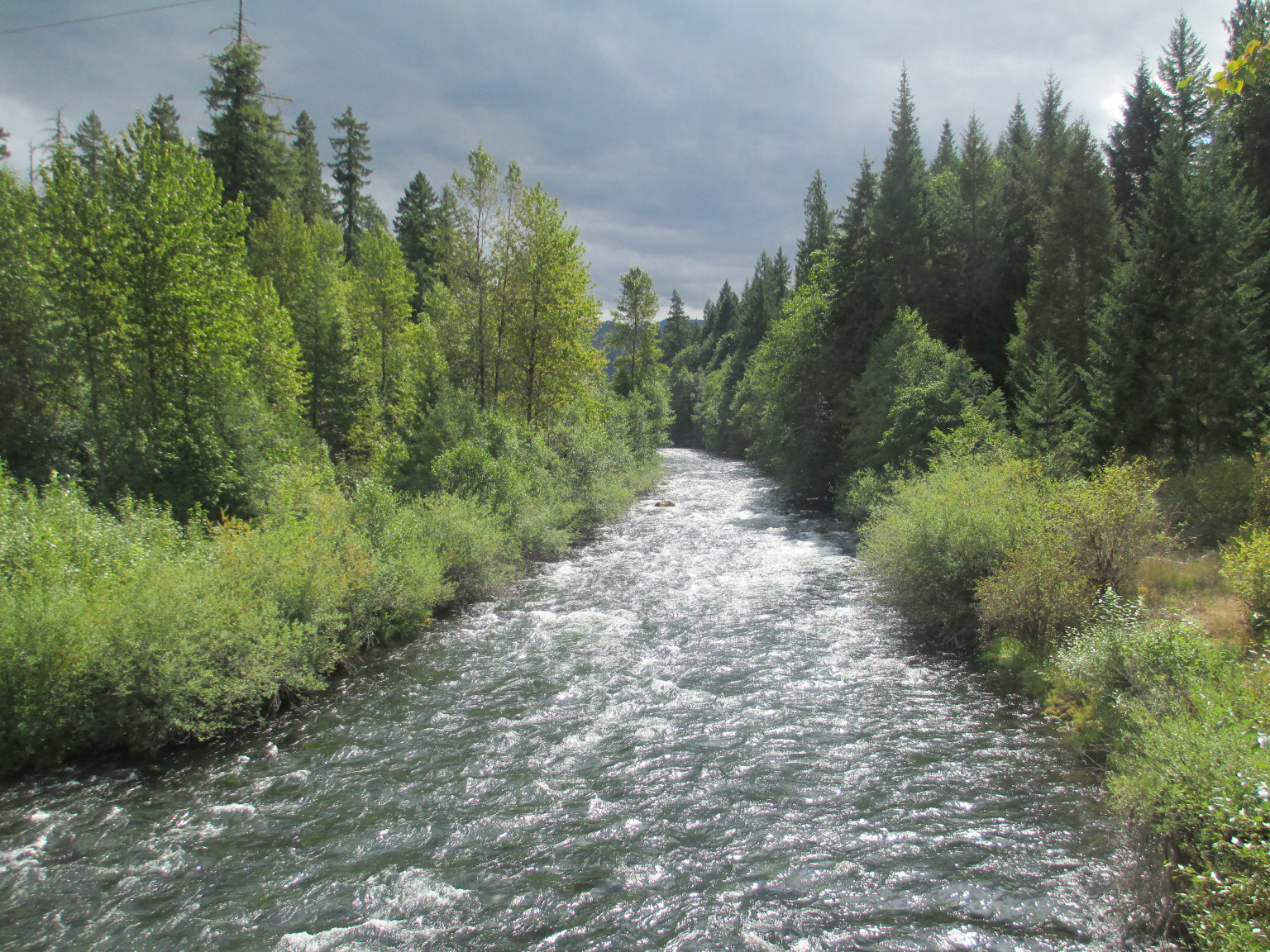
- South Fork McKenzie River

- Location of the mouth of the South Fork McKenzie River in Oregon

Location
- Country: United States
- State: Oregon
- County: Lane

Physical characteristics
- Source: near Mink Lake
  - location: Three Sisters Wilderness, Cascade Range
  - coordinates: 43°56′36″N 121°55′32″W
  - elevation: 4,559 ft (1,390 m)
- Mouth: McKenzie River
  - location: near Blue River
  - coordinates: 44°09′32″N 122°17′44″W
  - elevation: 1,093 ft (333 m)
- Length: 31 mi (50 km)
- Basin size: 213 sq mi (550 km^{2})
- Discharge
  - location: 0.6 miles (1 km) downstream of Cougar Dam and 3.9 miles (6.3 km) from the mouth
  - average: 853 cu ft/s (24.2 m^{3}/s)
  - minimum: 17 cu ft/s (0.48 m^{3}/s)
  - maximum: 17,600 cu ft/s (500 m^{3}/s)

The South Fork McKenzie River is a tributary, about 31 miles (50 km) long, of the McKenzie River in the U.S. state of Oregon. It begins at about 4,500 feet (1,400 m) above sea level near Mink Lake in the Three Sisters Wilderness of the Cascade Range. Flowing northwest within Lane County, it meets the McKenzie River about 60 miles (97 km) from the larger river's confluence with the Willamette River.

About 4.5 miles (7.2 km) from the South Fork mouth, Cougar Dam impounds water from the river to create Cougar Reservoir. It is a multipurpose United States Army Corps of Engineers project built in 1963 to generate hydroelectricity and limit flooding.

The watershed offers many opportunities for recreation, including fishing, swimming, hiking, and camping. Motorized boating is allowed on Cougar Reservoir, which is used for waterskiing. A popular hot springs is along a tributary near the reservoir. Whitewater enthusiasts sometimes run a difficult stretch of the upper river.

== Course ==
The South Fork McKenzie River begins in the Mink Lake Basin of the Cascade Range at an elevation of about 4,600 feet (1,400 m) above sea level. Lakes near the river's headwaters include Mink, Porky, Mud, Plumb, Goose, and Corner, as well as many smaller water bodies. Flowing west through the Three Sisters Wilderness of the Willamette National Forest, the river receives Elk Creek from the left at river mile (RM) 25 or river kilometer (RK) 40. About 2 miles (3 km) further downstream, the river leaves the wilderness.

The river passes Frissel Crossing Campground, which is on the left, about 22 miles (35 km) from the mouth. Slightly downstream of the campground, the South Fork passes under Forest Road 19 (Aufderheide Drive), which then runs parallel to the river along its right bank, and Roaring River enters from the left. Over the next stretch, Fir and Cascade creeks enter from the right. The Homestead Campground is on the right at about RM 18 (RK 29), and here the river turns northwest and then north. Augusta Creek enters from the left about 2 miles (3 km) later at Dutch Oven Campground.

Over the next stretch, Starr and Blue creeks enter from the left and Trail and Rebel creeks from the right. Hardy and Balm creeks enter from the left about 12 miles (19 km) from the mouth. Below this, the river reaches French Pete Campground, which is on the right, and receives Horn and Penny creeks from the left before arriving at a United States Geological Survey stream gauge near the mouth of Tipsoo Creek, at about RM 10 (RK 16). Just beyond the gauge, the river enters Cougar Reservoir, receiving Ridge Creek from the left and passing Cougar Crossing Campground, which is on the right. Here the river passes under Forest Road 19, which continues to parallel the South Fork but along its left bank. Shortly thereafter, Smith Creek enters from the right near Sunnyside Campground, and then Slide Creek enters from the right near Slide Creek Campground and its boat ramp.

Rider Creek enters from the left at RM 8 (RK 13), and Boone Creek enters from the left a fraction of a mile later. In the next stretch of the reservoir, Annie and Basalt creeks enter from the left and Walker Creek from the right before the river receives the East Fork South Fork McKenzie River from the right about 5 miles (8 km) from the South Fork mouth. A fraction of a mile below this, Rush Creek enters from the left, and the river reaches Cougar Dam and power plant.

Another stream gauge is beyond the dam, at about RM 4 (RK 6). Along this stretch, a county road linking the dam to Oregon Route 126 is on the river's right bank, while Forest Road 19 is on the left. In its last stretch, the river passes again under Forest Road 19, which merges with the dam road. The South Fork turns west and meanders another mile or so, passing the Delta Campground, which is on its right, and entering the McKenzie River main stem about 59.5 miles (95.8 km) from its confluence with the Willamette River.

== Recreation ==
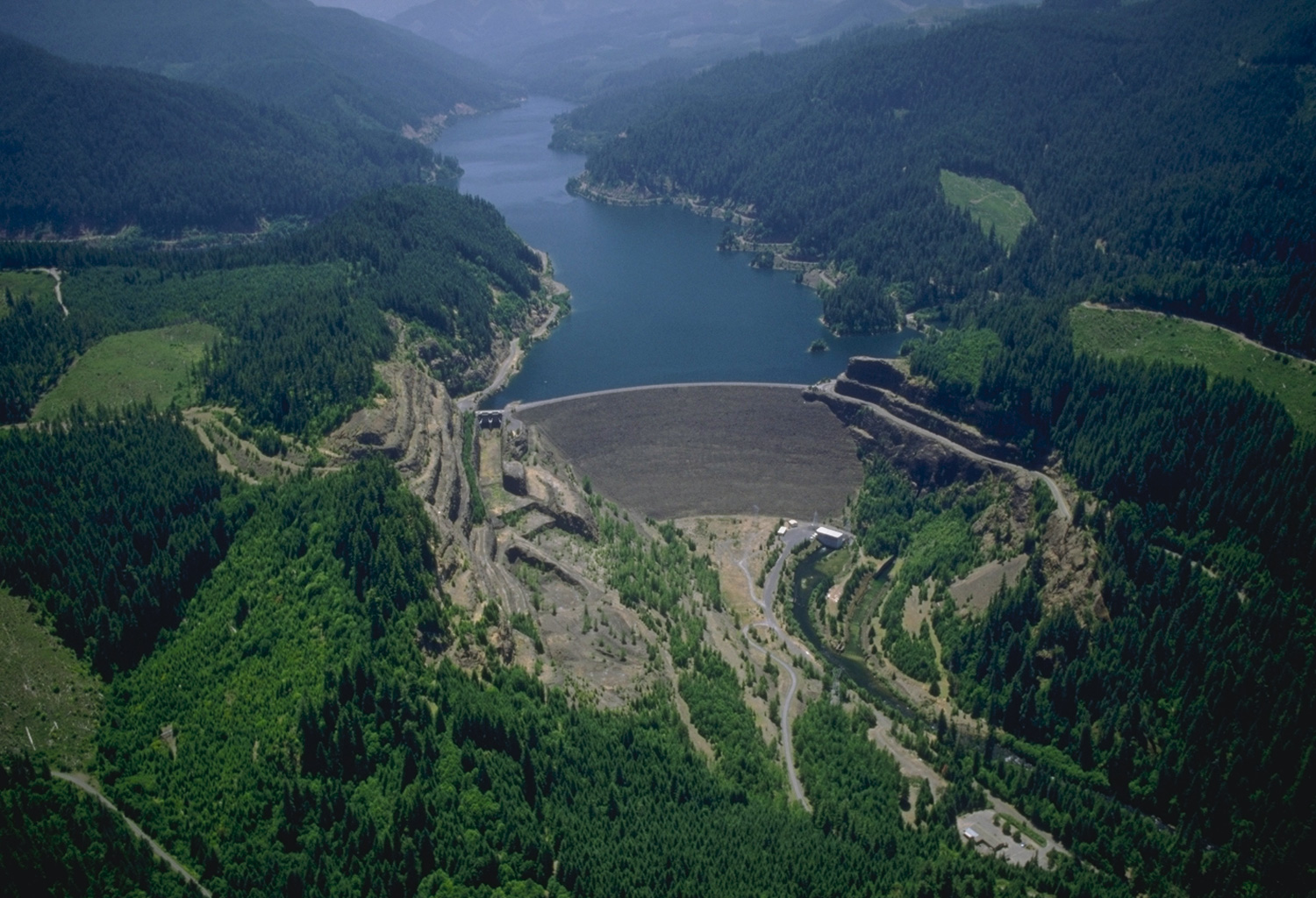
Cougar Dam on the South Fork

Fishing, camping, hiking, swimming, and boating are among the forms of recreation pursued in the South Fork McKenzie River watershed. Cougar Reservoir is used for motorized boating, fishing, swimming, and waterskiing. The United States Forest Service maintains three campgrounds—Cougar Crossing, Slide Creek, and Sunnyside—near the reservoir, with opportunities for hiking and picnicking as well as camping. Other campgrounds in the general vicinity of the reservoir include French Pete and Delta.

Cougar Reservoir supports populations of stocked rainbow trout and stocked landlocked Chinook salmon as well as naturally reproducing cutthroat trout. The lake also supports bull trout, but it is not legal to catch and keep them. Catch-and-release fishing for cutthroat and bull trout is popular on the upper river and its tributaries. Fish on the upper river are numerous but relatively small, averaging 8 to 11 inches (20 to 28 cm).

Terwilliger Hot Springs, near the confluence of Rider Creek and the South Fork, offers six clothing-optional soaking pools in sight of a waterfall and "a spectacular rock formation". The popular hot springs, with a parking lot off Forest Road 19, requires a day-use pass that can be paid for on-site.

Whitewater enthusiasts sometimes run all or part of an 8.5-mile (13.7 km) stretch of the river from above French Pete Campground to Cougar Reservoir. Rapids vary from class 3 to 5 on the International Scale of River Difficulty.

== See also ==
- List of rivers of Oregon
