= East Fork South Fork McKenzie River =

- Location of the mouth of East Fork South Fork McKenzie River in Oregon

Location
- Country: United States
- State: Oregon
- County: Lane

Physical characteristics
- Source: Cascade Range
  - location: Willamette National Forest
  - coordinates: 44°04′00″N 122°05′43″W
  - elevation: 4,592 ft (1,400 m)
- Mouth: South Fork McKenzie River
  - location: Cougar Reservoir
  - coordinates: 44°06′55″N 122°14′16″W
  - elevation: 1,686 ft (514 m)

The East Fork South Fork McKenzie River is a tributary of the South Fork McKenzie River in Lane County in the U.S. state of Oregon. It begins in and passes through part of the Willamette National Forest of the Cascade Range. Flowing generally northwest along the base of Sawtooth Ridge, it empties into Cougar Reservoir on the South Fork McKenzie River, about 5 miles (8 km) upstream of that stream's mouth on the McKenzie River.

The East Fork, which has no named tributaries, runs along the north edge of the Three Sisters Wilderness. East Fork Trail 3308 follows the stream for much of its length, crossing it twice on footbridges.

== See also ==
- List of rivers of Oregon
