= Cougar Reservoir =

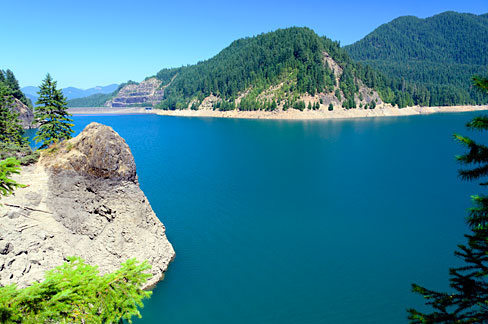
- Cougar Reservoir in the Cascade Mountains

- Location of Cougar Reservoir in Oregon, USA. Cougar Reservoir (the United States)
- Location: Lane County, Oregon
- Coordinates: 44°7′2″N 122°14′20″W
- Type: Reservoir
- Primary inflows: South Fork McKenzie River
- Primary outflows: South Fork McKenzie River
- Catchment area: 207 square miles (536 km^{2})
- Basin countries: United States
- Max. length: About 5 miles (8 km)
- Surface area: 1,280 acres (5.18 km^{2})
- Average depth: 171 feet (52 m)
- Max. depth: 425 feet (130 m)
- Water volume: 219,300 acre-feet (0.271 km^{3})
- Residence time: 4 months
- Shore length^{1}: 18 miles (29 km)
- Surface elevation: 1,558 feet (475 m)
- Settlements: Rainbow
- ^{1} Shore length is not a well-defined measure.

Cougar Reservoir (also known as Cougar Lake) is a reservoir on the South Fork McKenzie River in the U.S. state of Oregon. It is in Lane County, 46 miles (74 km) east of Eugene and about 3 miles (5 km) south of the community of Rainbow in the Willamette National Forest. In 1963 the United States Army Corps of Engineers built Cougar Dam on the river primarily to generate hydroelectricity and control flooding, and the reservoir formed behind the dam.

The lake is also used for recreation, including boating, fishing, swimming, and waterskiing. The United States Forest Service maintains three campgrounds—Cougar Crossing, Slide Creek, and Sunnyside—near the reservoir, with opportunities for hiking and picnicking as well as camping. Other campgrounds in the general vicinity include French Pete and Delta. Terwilliger Hot Springs is along Rider Creek just west of the lake.

Cougar Reservoir supports populations of stocked rainbow trout and stocked landlocked Chinook salmon as well as naturally reproducing cutthroat trout. Fishing for rainbow trout, especially in winter, is said to be "fair". The lake also supports bull trout, but it is not legal to catch and keep them.

== See also ==
- List of lakes in Oregon
