= Mink Lake =

Mink Lake may refer to:

== Lakes ==
- Big Mink Lake, Ontario, Canada
- Little Mink Lake (Lennox and Addington County), Ontario, Canada
- Mink Lake (Lane County, Oregon), United States
- Mink Lake (Teton County, Wyoming), Grand Teton National Park, United States

== Settlements ==
- Mink Lake, Nipissing District, Ontario, Canada
