= Cougar Dam =

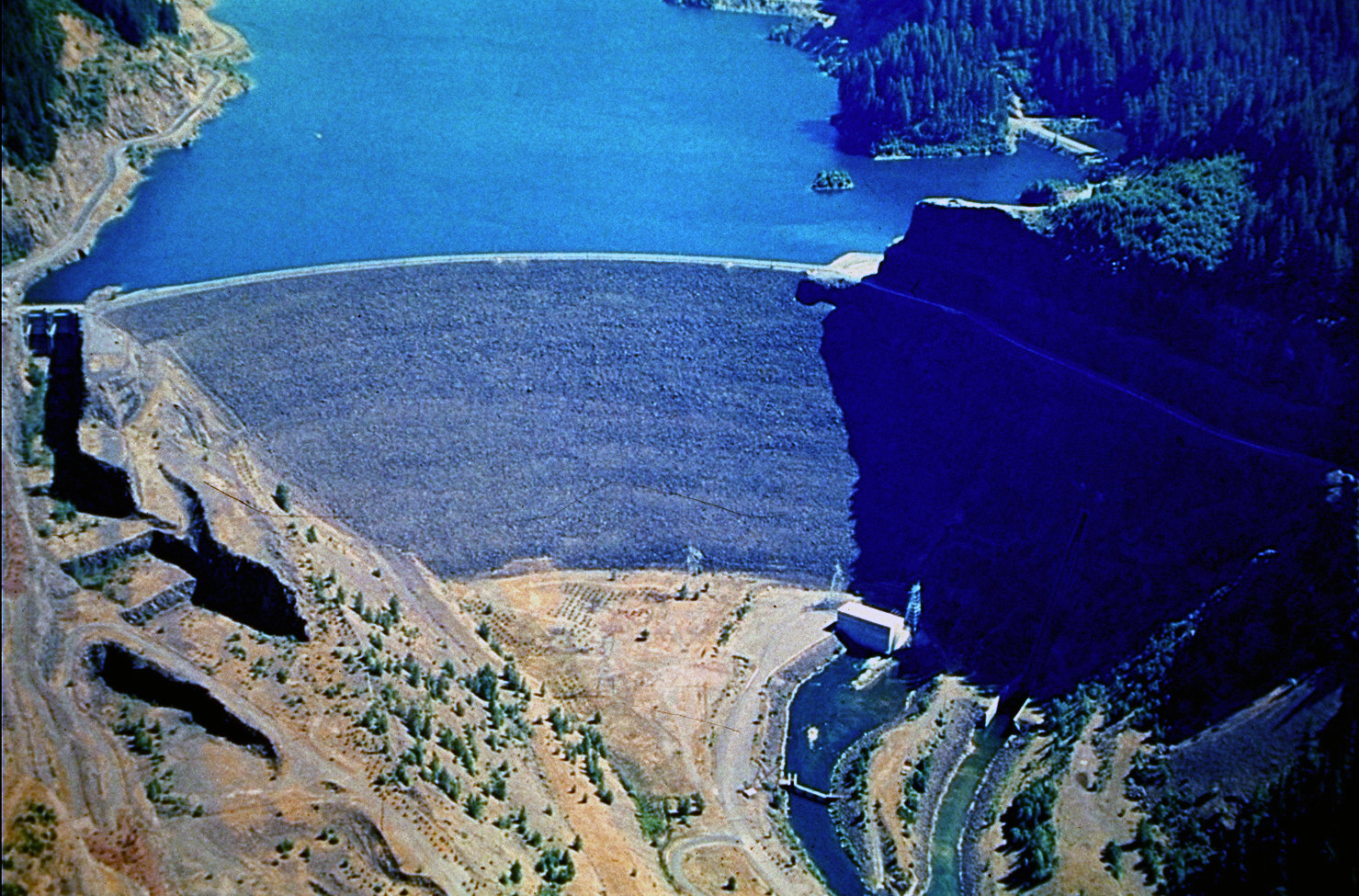
- Aerial view
- Interactive map of Cougar Dam
- Location: Lane County, Oregon, U.S.
- Coordinates: 44°7′44″N 122°14′25″W
- Opening date: 1964
- Operator: Cenwp

Dam and spillways
- Impounds: South Fork McKenzie River
- Height: 519 feet (158 m)
- Length: 1,600 feet (488 m)

Reservoir
- Creates: Cougar Reservoir
- Total capacity: 219,000 acre-feet (0.270 km^{3})
- Catchment area: 210 square miles (544 km^{2})
- Surface area: 1,280 acres (520 ha)

Cougar Dam is a 519-foot (158 m) tall rockfill hydroelectric dam in the U.S. state of Oregon. It has a gated concrete spillway and a powerhouse with two turbines totaling 25 megawatts of electric power.

The dam impounds the South Fork McKenzie River about 42 miles (68 km) east of Eugene, Oregon, creating Cougar Reservoir which has a storage capacity of 219,000 acre-feet (270,000,000 m^{3}). The purpose of Cougar Dam is to provide flood risk management, hydropower, water quality improvement, irrigation, fish and wildlife habitat, recreation, storage, and navigation.

In 2005, the Willamette temperature control facility was constructed to help regulate the water temperature released to the river below Cougar Dam in an attempt to reduce the negative effects on salmon migration. To further help recover threatened chinook salmon and bull trout populations, in the Willamette River Basin, the U.S. Army Corps of Engineers constructed a fish collection and sorting facility on the South Fork McKenzie River below Cougar Dam which was completed in 2010. From 2003 to 2005, state-of-the-art turbine runners were installed in the turbine-generator units at the Cougar powerhouse, and were designed to resist cavitation and operate efficiently at very large head ranges.

== Background ==
Cougar Dam was completed in 1963 at a cost of $54.2 million and the two turbine units were completed in 1964. Cougar Dam operates in coordination with Blue River Dam to control flooding, and since the completion of the dam, it is estimated that it prevented approximately $452 million in potential flood damages. The dam consists of a rock-fill embankment approximately 1,500 feet (460 m) long, a penstock to power two Kaplan turbines, an emergency spillway capable of a capacity of 76,140 cu ft/s (2,156 m^{3}/s), a regulating outlet, and a diversion tunnel. The diversion tunnel was built to divert the South Fork McKenzie River during the construction of Cougar Dam, and the tunnel was later closed with a concrete plug once the construction of the dam was complete.

== Temperature control tower ==
The original intakes for the powerhouse and regulating outlet were deep and pulled water from the bottom of the reservoir which is much colder than the surface water. During the spring and summer, the release of unnaturally cold water into the McKenzie River reduces salmon migration and productivity. In the fall, the reservoir level is considerably lower and the warmer water from the surface enters the intakes and makes the river downstream unnaturally warm which causes salmon eggs to hatch several months too early. In order to help control the temperature of water discharged below the dam, the original intake tower was modified by adding a 302-foot (92 m) tall wet well. The wet well has three adjustable gates at various levels so that different temperature water can be mixed in the wet well to a desired temperature. The mixed water enters the existing regulating and penstock intakes. By controlling the temperature of the water released from the dam, the impacts on the McKenzie River are greatly reduced.

== Fish collection and sorting facility ==
When the Cougar Dam was originally constructed, it contained adult and juvenile fish passage facilities that helped fish move past the dam. However, fish no longer migrated to the facility, and it became ineffective. The Army Corps of Engineers decided to construct a new collection and sorting facility to collect, sort, and transport fish upstream and downstream of the dam. The new facility would cost $14.7 million and include a fish ladder, presort pool, sorting facility, and two pump structures for water supply. At the collection and sorting facility, adult salmon and bull trout will be loaded on trucks and released into high-quality habitats above Cougar Dam in an effort to recover threatened salmon and bull trout populations.

== Replacement of turbines ==
The runners from the two turbines in the Cougar powerhouse experienced significant cavitation damage during operation and by the 1980s they were in need of repair and had to be taken out of service four times a year for inspections and repair. In 1987, the U.S. Army Corps of Engineers installed replacement runners that were designed by Voith Siemens Hydro Power Generation. By 2000, the replacement runners were again experiencing cavitation problems and in need of repair. Repair of the runners would prove to be difficult because the runner blades are thin, making them difficult to weld, and the spacing between the blades is small which gives limited access to the damaged area. The U.S. Army Corps of Engineers realized that a state-of-the-art runner design was required and devised a turbine-generator rehabilitation program. Due to the technical challenges associated with the program, the Corps chose a best value procurement method for this project. In 2003, the contract was awarded to General Electric Hydro of Montreal, Quebec, Canada and the project was completed in March 2005. The project included physical model testing, new turbine runners, a major turbine overhaul, a generator rewind, and disassembly and reassembly of the units. The problems with the runners for the turbines at Cougar powerhouse are associated with the cycle of large head changes of the Cougar Reservoir. Since Cougar Reservoir is built for flood control, the levels of the reservoir vary greatly, causing the units to operate at heads between 400 and 438 feet (122 and 134 m) one third of the time and at heads between 270 and 310 feet (82 and 94 m) one fifth of the time. In 2002, the Corps began lowering the level of the reservoir for the construction of a temperature control facility. The reservoir level was lowered to an elevation below the turbine intakes, which put the powerhouse out of service and provided an opportunity to overhaul the turbine-generator units.

== See also ==
- List of lakes in Oregon
