= Roaring River (South Fork McKenzie River tributary) =

- Location of the mouth of the Roaring River in Oregon

Location
- Country: United States
- State: Oregon
- County: Lane

Physical characteristics
- Source: Cascade Range
  - location: Willamette National Forest
  - coordinates: 43°53′36″N 122°01′04″W
  - elevation: 5,323 ft (1,622 m)
- Mouth: South Fork McKenzie River
  - location: near Frissell Crossing Campground
  - coordinates: 43°57′19″N 122°05′26″W
  - elevation: 2,543 ft (775 m)

Roaring River is a tributary of the South Fork McKenzie River in Lane County in the U.S. state of Oregon. It begins along the west side of Roaring River Ridge in the Cascade Range and flows generally north through the Willamette National Forest to meet the larger stream about 22 miles (35 km) from its confluence with the McKenzie River.

Forest Road 19 (Aufderheide Memorial Drive) runs parallel to Roaring River along its lower reaches and then along its main tributary, McBee Creek. Downstream of McBee Creek, the road crosses the river's other named tributary, Moss Creek. Both creeks enter the main stem from the left.

== Campgrounds ==
Campgrounds along or near the river include Frissell Crossing along the South Fork slightly upstream of the mouth of Roaring River. Generally open from early May to mid-September, it has 12 tent, car, and trailer sites, drinking water, and vault toilets.

Roaring River Group Campground, with five sites for group camping, can accommodate up to 30 people at a time. Amenities include picnic tables and vault toilets but no drinking water. The campground is generally open from early May to late October along Forest Road 19 and the lower reach of the river.

The Box Canyon Guard Station, near the headwaters of McBee Creek, is a 16-by-24-foot (4.9 by 7.3 m) cabin that is generally open for rental from mid-June through the end of October. The station, built by the Civilian Conservation Corps in 1933, sleeps four and has a variety of amenities, including a horse corral; however, these amenities do not include indoor plumbing, drinking water, or electricity. The guard station is near a wide variety of mountain trails, some for day hiking and backpacking, others for horse riding or mountain biking.

== See also ==
- List of rivers of Oregon
