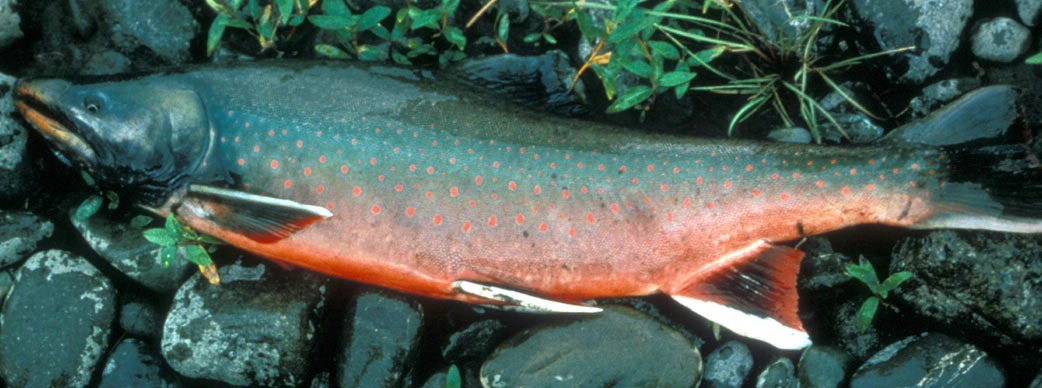
- Adult in spawning colors

Conservation status
- Least Concern (IUCN 3.1)

Scientific classification
- Kingdom: Animalia
- Phylum: Chordata
- Class: Actinopterygii
- Division: Teleostei
- Order: Salmoniformes
- Family: Salmonidae
- Genus: Salvelinus
- Species: S. malma

Binomial name
- Salvelinus malma (Walbaum, 1792)

Synonyms
- including current subspecies: Salmo malma Walbaum, 1792 Salvelinus alpinus malma (Walbaum, 1792) Salvelinus malma malma (Walbaum, 1792) Salmo spectabilis Girard, 1856 Salvelinus malma spectabilis (Girard, 1856) Salvelinus spectabilis (Girard, 1856) Salmo bairdii Suckley, 1861 Salvelinus bairdii (Suckley, 1861) Salmo parkei Suckley, 1861 Salvelinus parkei (Suckley, 1861) Salmo parkii Suckley, 1861 Salmo lordii Günther, 1866 Fario lordii (Günther, 1866) Salmo tudes (Cope, 1873) Salvelinus malma tudes (Cope, 1873) Salvelinus miyabei (Oshima, 1938) Salvelinus malma miyabei (Oshima, 1938) Salvelinus namaycush (non Walbaum, 1792) Salmo fariopsis (non Kner, 1870) Salvelinus malma krascheninnikova (non Taranetz, 1933)

= Dolly Varden trout =

Species of fish

The Dolly Varden trout (Salvelinus malma) is a species of salmonid ray-finned fish native to cold-water tributaries of the Pacific Ocean in Asia and North America. Despite the name "trout" (which typically refers to freshwater species from the genera Salmo and Oncorhynchus), it belongs to the genus Salvelinus (chars), which includes 51 recognized species, the most prominent being the brook, lake and bull trout as well as the Arctic char. Although many populations are semi-anadromous, riverine and lacustrine populations occur throughout its range. It is considered by taxonomists as part of the Salvelinus alpinus (Arctic char) complex, as many populations of bull trout, Dolly Varden trout and Arctic char overlap.

== Taxonomy ==
The scientific name of the Dolly Varden is Salvelinus malma. The species was originally named by German naturalist and taxonomist Johann Julius Walbaum in 1792 based on type specimens from the Kamchatka Peninsula in Siberia. The name malma was based on Russian мальма, the local colloquial name for the fish. The Dolly Varden trout is considered part of the S. alpinus or Arctic char complex.

For most of the 19th and 20th centuries, the Dolly Varden trout (S. malma) and the bull trout (S. confluentus) were considered the same species. Additionally, the Arctic char (S. alpinus) along with the bull trout have ranges that overlap and are remarkably similar in appearance, thus complicating identification. In 1978, inland forms of the Dolly Varden trout were reclassified as Salvelinus confluentus, retaining the common name bull trout. It appears that the first recorded use of the Dolly Varden name for fish referred to S. confluentus, now commonly known as the bull trout. This was likely due to overlapping ranges and similar appearances among members of the two species.

=== Subspecies ===
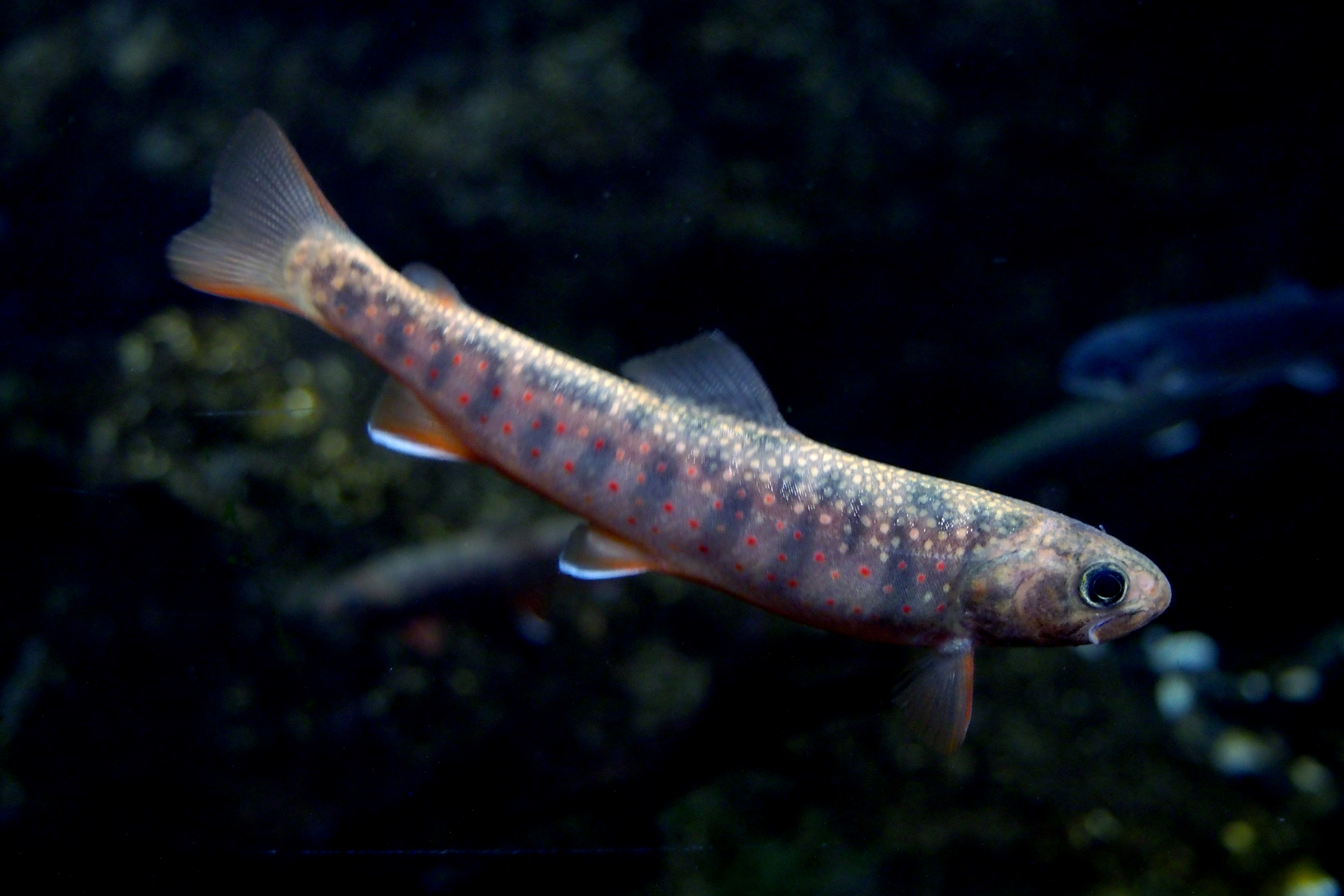
Dolly Varden fingerling at Hokkaido Japan aquarium, probably Salvelinus malma miyabei

In North America, two subspecies of Dolly Varden are distinguished, the Northern Dolly Varden (S. m. malma) of the Arctic drainages and the Southern Dolly Varden (S. m. lordi) of the Pacific drainages. These can be distinguished as separate mitochondrial lineages also. The status of the Beringian drainage populations remains unclear. Northern populations on the Russian side of the Pacific down to Kamchatka are considered S. m. malma, and the southerly populations make another lineage and subspecies, the Asian Dolly Varden (or southern Dolly Varden) S. m. krascheninnikova (= S. curilus). The landlocked Miyabe Char (S. m. miyabei Oshima, 1938) from Lake Shikaribetsu on Hokkaido in Japan is also included in the Dolly Varden species.

- S. m. malma (Walbaum, 1792) (Northern Dolly Varden)
- S. m. lordi (Günther, 1866) (Southern Dolly Varden)
- S. m. krascheninnikova (Taranez, 1933) = Salvelinus curilus (Southern Dolly Varden or Asian Dolly Varden)
- S. m. miyabei (Oshima, 1938) (Miyabe char)

The angayukaksurak char (formerly Salvelinus anaktuvukensis) of northern Alaska was described as a distinct species on morphological grounds by Morrow in 1973, but the concept of a separate species status was soon refuted, even by Morrow himself. Further genetic studies have also failed to distinguish this fish from the more widespread Dolly Varden trout (Salvelinus malma malma), and it is now considered to represent natural variation within that subspecies.

=== Origin of common name "Dolly Varden" ===
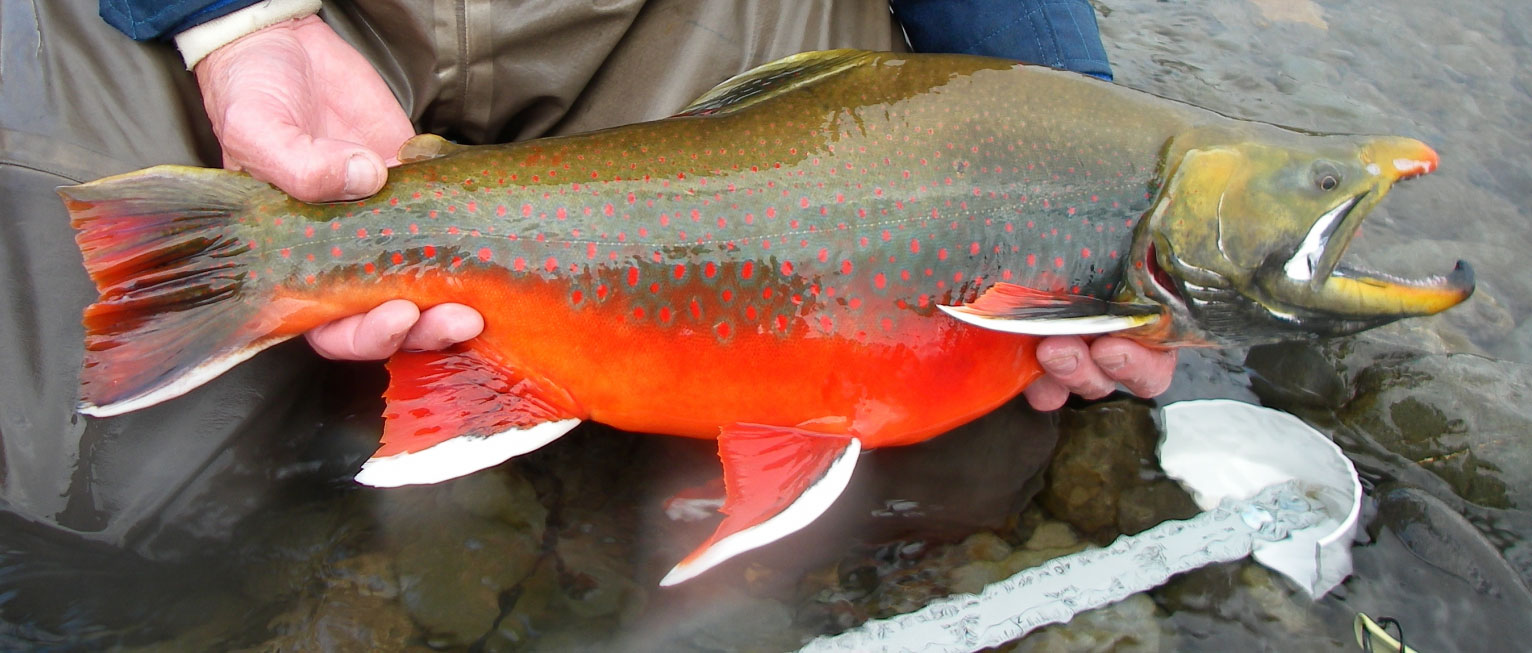
A freshly caught fish

The first recorded use of the name "Dolly Varden" was applied to members of S. confluentus caught in the McCloud River in northern California in the early 1870s. In his book Inland Fishes of California, Peter B. Moyle recounts a letter sent to him on March 24, 1974, from Valerie Masson Gomez:

My grandmother's family operated a summer resort at Upper Soda Springs on the Sacramento River just north of the present town of Dunsmuir, California. She lived there all her life and related to us in her later years her story about the naming of the Dolly Varden trout. She said that some fishermen were standing on the lawn at Upper Soda Springs looking at a catch of the large trout from the McCloud River that were called 'calico trout' because of their spotted, colorful markings. They were saying that the trout should have a better name. My grandmother, then a young girl of 15 or 16, had been reading Charles Dickens' Barnaby Rudge in which there appears a character named Dolly Varden; also the vogue in fashion for women at that time (middle 1870s) was called "Dolly Varden", a dress of sheer figured muslin worn over a bright-colored petticoat. My grandmother had just gotten a new dress in that style and the red-spotted trout reminded her of her printed dress. She suggested to the men looking down at the trout, 'Why not call them "Dolly Varden"?' They thought it a very appropriate name and the guests that summer returned to their homes (many in the San Francisco Bay area) calling the trout by this new name. David Starr Jordan, while at Stanford University, included an account of this naming of the Dolly Varden Trout in one of his books.

In 1874, Livingston Stone, a naturalist working for the U.S. government, wrote of this fish:

Also called at (Upper) Soda Springs the 'Varden' trout. ... The handsomest trout, and, on the whole, having the most perfect form of all the trout we saw on the McCloud. Also, the only fish that had colored spots. This one was profusely spotted over most of the body with reddish golden spots. ... The local name at (Upper) Soda Springs is the Dolly Varden.

Although the name "Dolly Varden" was originally given to the bull trout of the McCloud River, bull trout (S. confluentus) and Dolly Varden trout (S. malma) were considered the same species (S. malma) until 1978. Thus the common name "Dolly Varden" gained acceptance for S. malma for over 100 years. Additionally, the Arctic char (S. alpinus) and Russian subspecies have been referred to as Dolly Varden. It is known as belyi golets in Russian.

== Description ==
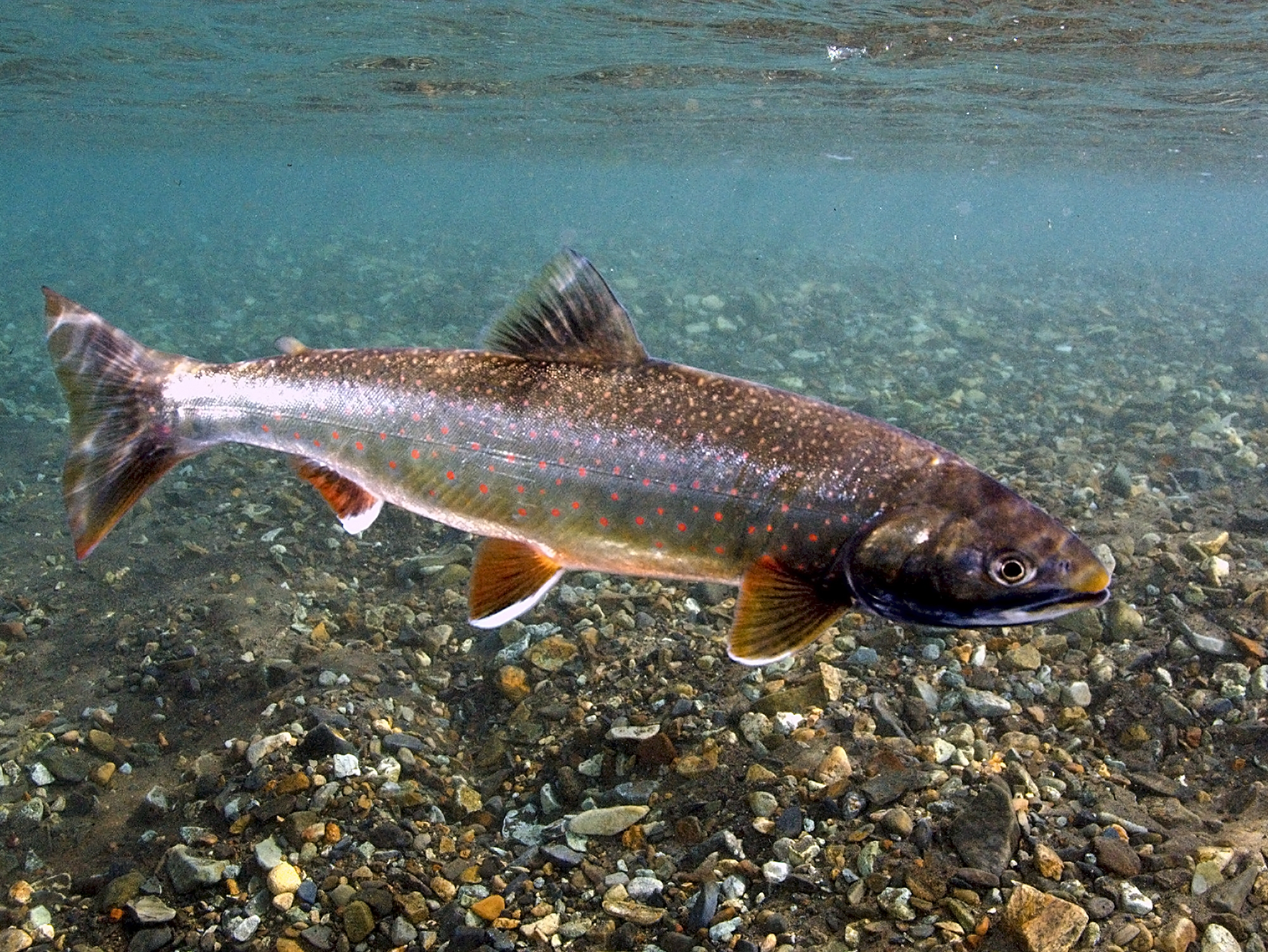
Dolly Varden in crystal clear river at the Bering Land Bridge National Preserve

The back and sides are olive green or muddy gray, shading to white on the belly. The body has scattered pale yellow or pinkish-yellow spots. There are no black spots or wavy lines on the body or fins. Small red spots are present on the lower sides. These are frequently indistinct. The fins are plain and unmarked except for a few light spots on the base of the caudal fin rays. S. malma is extremely similar in appearance to the bull trout (S. confluentus) and Arctic char (S. alpinus), so much so that they are sometimes referred to as "native char" without a distinction.

== Range ==
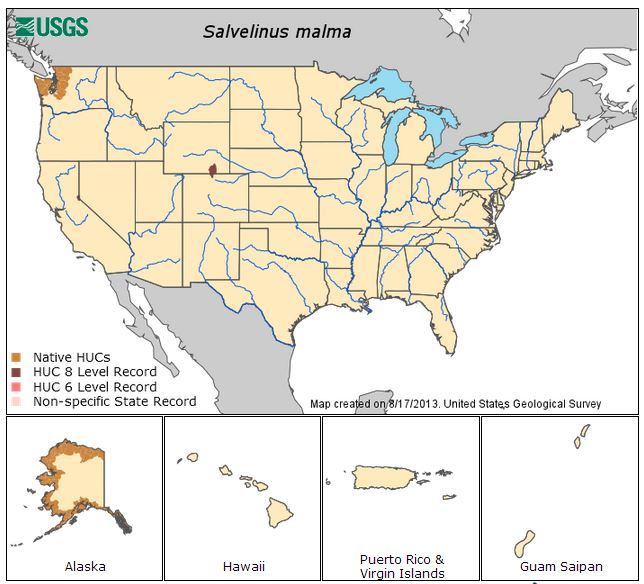
U.S. range map for Salvelinus malma, Dolly Varden trout

The Dolly Varden trout is found in coastal waters of the North Pacific from Puget Sound north along the British Columbia Coast to the Alaska Peninsula and into the eastern Aleutian Islands, along the Bering Sea and the Arctic Sea to the Mackenzie River. The range in Asia extends south through the Kamchatka Peninsula into northern Japan.

== Life cycle ==
Dolly Varden are found in three distinct forms. A semi-anadromous or sea-run form migrates from fresh water and spends some time in the ocean or saltwater bays and estuaries to feed before returning to fresh water to spawn. Fluvial forms live in moderate to large freshwater riverine environments and migrate into smaller tributaries to spawn. A third form is found in deep, cold lakes, from where they eventually migrate into tributary streams to spawn. Most populations of the northern Dolly Varden (S. m. malma) are semi-anadromous, while more fluvial and lacustrine populations are found among the southern Dolly Varden (S. m. lordi).

== Conservation ==
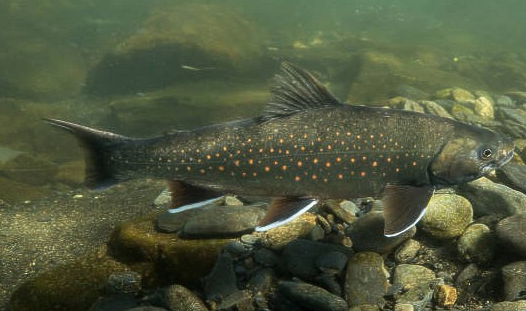
Dolly in shallow water, Kenai National Wildlife Refuge, Alaska

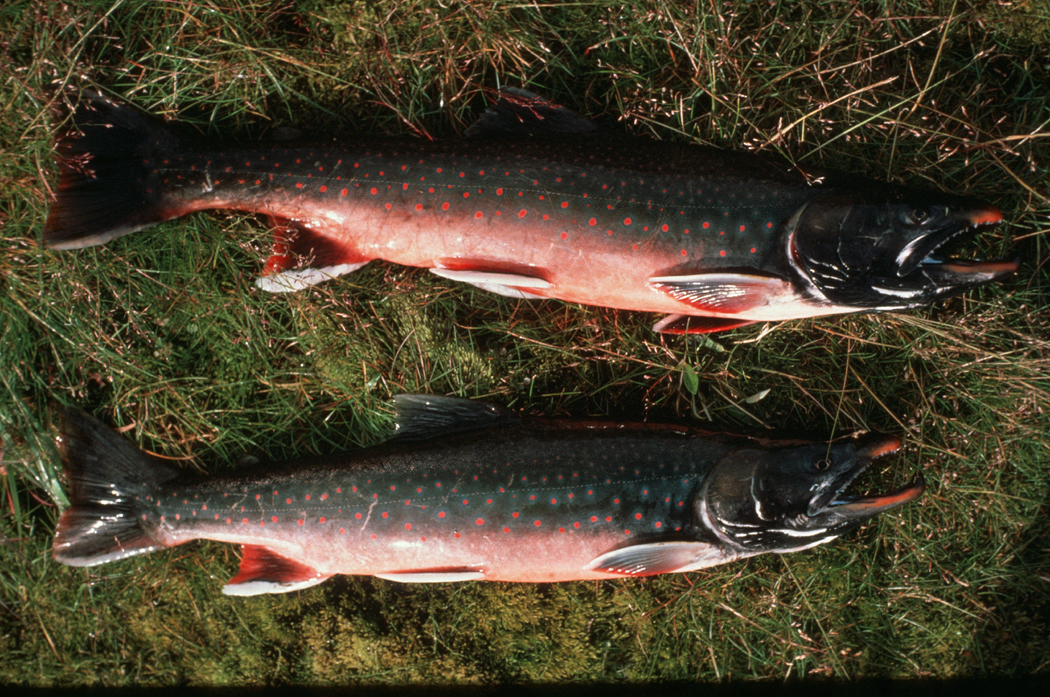
S. m. malma

In the early 20th century, the Dolly Varden (still including bull trout, and often confused with Arctic char) suffered from a reputation as an undesirable predator of fish such as salmon, steelhead and cutthroat trout. Despite co-evolving with these other species for thousands of years, Dolly Varden were accused of indiscriminately feeding on eggs and fry of other species to their detriment. Between 1921 and 1941, the Territory of Alaska, supported by the U.S. Bureau of Fisheries, had an official extermination program that paid bounties on Dolly Varden. In the Iliamna Lake/Kvichak River region in southwest Alaska, the bounty was 2.5 cents per Dolly Varden tail turned into the territorial tax collector. Locals would trap Dolly Varden in nets and weirs, string 40 tails on a hoop of bailing wire and smoke them over a wood fire. One hoop would be worth one dollar. The fish carcasses would be used for dog food. The hoops of fishtails were then used as currency to pay for supplies, or in some reports, airfare with local bush pilots.

The northern Dolly Varden in the Canadian province of British Columbia and in the federal region of the Northwest Territories is listed as a species of special concern.

== Fishing ==
The Dolly Varden is considered and regulated as a game fish in the U.S. and Canada. Dolly Varden make up a sizable percentage of the catch in Alaskan subsistence fisheries where salmon are not abundant. Anglers will use a variety of lures to catch Dolly Varden, but when fishing during salmon spawning season, salmon roe is the bait of choice.
