= USS Mink =

History

United States
- Laid down: 20 October 1943
- Launched: 4 December 1943
- Commissioned: 9 January 1944
- Decommissioned: 26 June 1946
- Fate: Sold into merchant service

General characteristics
- Displacement: 14,500 tons
- Length: 441 ft 6 in (134.57 m)
- Beam: 56 ft 11 in (17.35 m)
- Draught: 28 ft 4 in (8.64 m)
- Speed: 11 knots
- Complement: 105 officers and men
- Armament: 1 × 5-inch 38 caliber dual purpose gun; 1 × 3 in (76 mm) gun; 8 × 20 mm cannons

USS Mink (IX-123), an Armadillo-class tanker designated an unclassified miscellaneous vessel, was the only ship of the United States Navy to be named for the mink, a mammal found in the cooler latitudes of the Northern Hemisphere, valued for its lustrous fur. Her keel was laid down as Judah Touro 20 October 1943 under a Maritime Commission contract (T. Z.ET1.S.C3) by Delta S. B. Shipbuilding Company, New Orleans, Louisiana. She was launched on 4 December 1943 sponsored by Mrs. E. S. Lazarus, renamed Mink 27 October 1943, acquired by the Navy 8 January 1944, and commissioned on 9 January 1944.

After shakedown off Texas, Mink arrived Balboa, Panama Canal Zone, on 2 February 1944. She then sailed to Milne Bay, New Guinea, with a cargo of diesel oil and motor gasoline, arriving 12 March to strengthen the service force of the Seventh Fleet. After unloading cargo and fuel along the coast of New Guinea, she joined a convoy which anchored in Seeadler Harbor, Admiralty Islands, on 30 May. Mink spent the next two months discharging cargoes, of aviation gasoline, diesel, and lubricating oil to many ships and craft during the buildup for the invasion of the Philippines.

She arrived in Leyte Gulf, Philippines, on 24 October from Hollandia, New Guinea. Mink's gunners shot down two Japanese planes during the Battle for Leyte Gulf.

Mink steamed with a convoy to Lingayen Gulf, Luzon, reaching her destination 13 January 1945. There Vice Admiral Thomas C. Kinkaid and the Seventh Fleet landed United States Army troops in an amphibious operation which contributed greatly to the success of the Luzon campaign. For the next four months, Mink steamed off Morotai, refueling ships, and during the final month of the war, she ranged from Luzon to Mindanao, refueling craft.

Following the Japanese surrender, she sailed to Newport News, Virginia, arriving 16 May 1946. Mink decommissioned on 26 June and was delivered to the War Shipping Administration on 27 June. On 19 July she was stricken from the Naval Vessel Register. Renamed Judah Touro, she was subsequently sold into merchant service, and later carried the names Seavalor, Apukia, and Eleni V.

Mink received three battle stars for World War II service.

A black and white photograph of the ship during its launching exists. It is in a historical display on the first floor of Touro Infirmary in New Orleans, Louisiana.
