= Mink Creek =

Mink Creek may refer to:

== Rivers in New York State ==
- Mink Creek (Canadarago Lake tributary), a creek in Otsego County
- Mink Creek (Fish Creek), a creek in Lewis County
- Mink Creek (Lake Ontario), a creek in Wayne County

== Places ==
- Mink Creek, Idaho, an unincorporated community in Franklin County, Idaho
