= Terwilliger Hot Springs =

Thermal springs in the Willamette National Forest in the U.S. state of Oregon

- Cougar Hot Springs
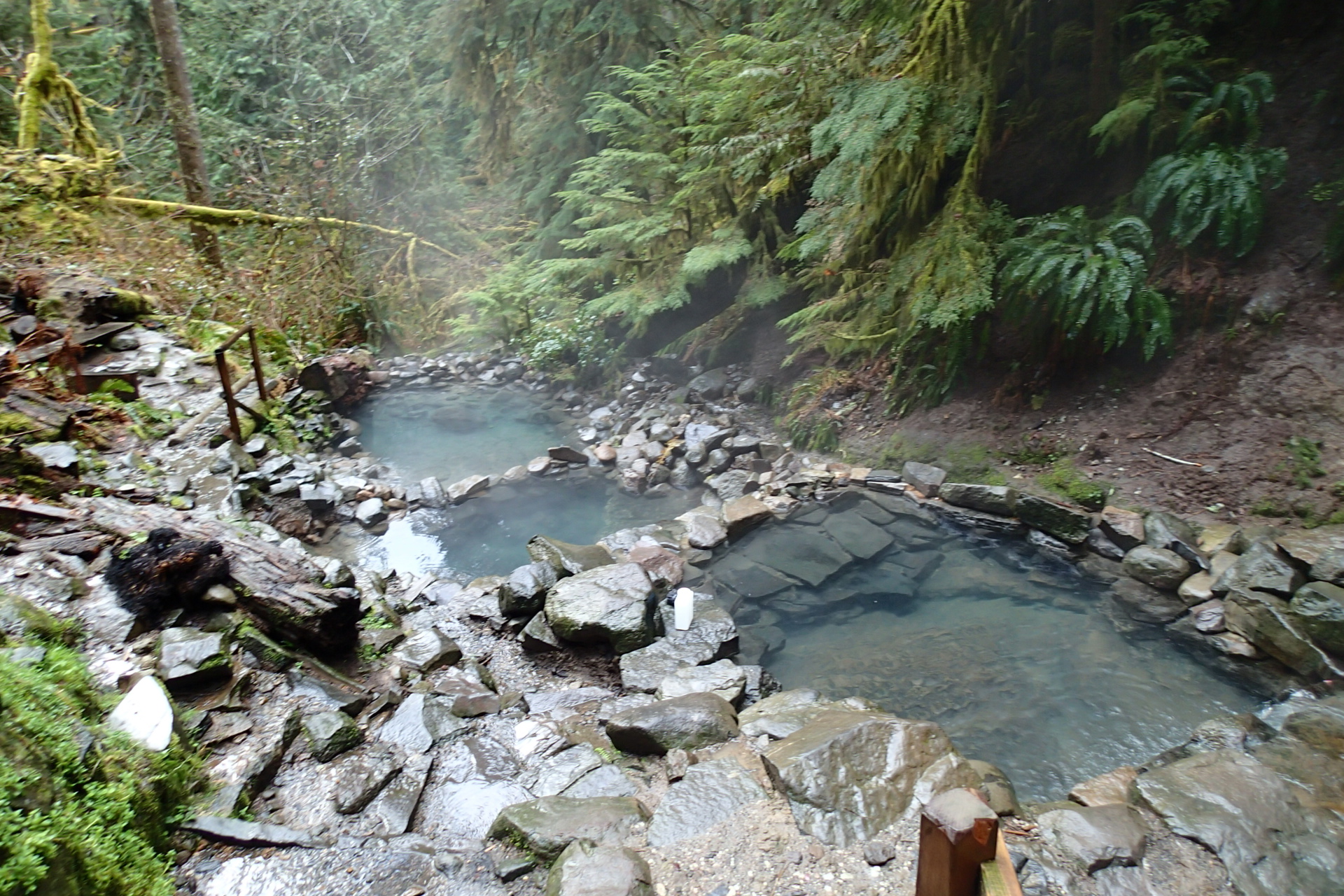
- Upper pools at Terwilliger Hot Springs

- Location within Oregon
- Interactive map of Terwilliger Hot Springs
- Location: Lane County, Oregon
- Coordinates: 44°5′0″N 122°14′21″W
- Elevation: 1,749 feet (533 m)
- Type: geothermal
- Temperature: 112 °F (44 °C)

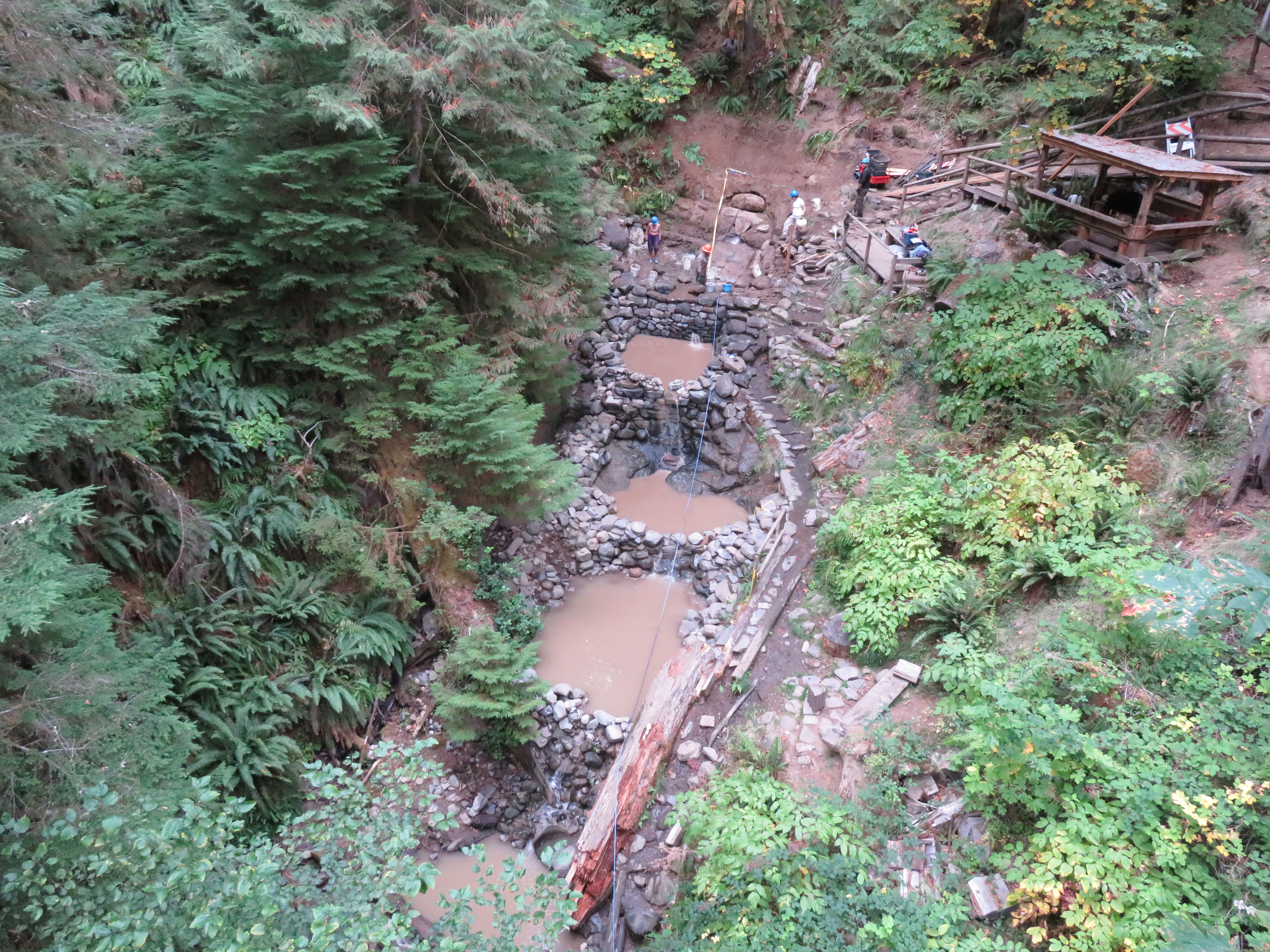
Terwilliger Hot Springs cascading soaking pools

Terwilliger Hot Springs, also known as Cougar Hot Springs, are geothermal pools in the Willamette National Forest in the U.S. state of Oregon, 53 miles (85 km) east of Eugene. The springs drain into Rider Creek, which in turn drains into Cougar Reservoir. They are about a quarter mile from Forest Service Road 19, also known as Aufderheide Memorial Drive.

== Description ==
Visitors over the years built up four soaking pools out of river stones. The pools' sizes range from 3 to 12 feet (0.9 to 3.7 m) across and 2 to 3 feet (0.6 to 0.9 m) deep. The water source is above the topmost pool where the spring flows from a rock face at approximately 112 °F (44 °C), the lowest pool is 85 °F (29 °C). The pools are on a hillside and cascade from one to the next so that each pool step lower is cooler than the one above it. The bottoms of the soaking pools are exposed bedrock and gravel, sand and debris.

Access to the springs is subject to a fee. Since 2012, the rates have been $10 per person per day or $60 per person for a seasonal pass to visit. Clothing in the bathing areas is optional, however nudity is not permitted within viewing distance from the Aufderheide Scenic Byway (Forest Road 19). Pets are not allowed at the pools, but there is a designated area before the pools where pets can be tied up. The springs are open for day use only, and alcohol is not permitted on site.

== History ==
Prior to the arrival of settlers, the hot springs may have been used by the local indigenous peoples. In the 1860s, Hiram Terwilliger founded the site to be used for mineral water baleanotheraputic purposes after originally filing for a cinnabar mining claim. He approached the Forest Service to file for mineral rights but his request was denied. In the 1960s the roads in the area were paved which allowed for greater access to the areas, and consequently they became popular with the public between 1960 and 1990.

The pools were renovated in 2009. A group of volunteers, led by a Eugene-based stonemason, removed concrete and built pools using a natural mortar. The new walls will be more stable and easier for volunteers to clean. The renovated pools, the construction of which cost an estimated $40,000, are expected to last for generations.

On December 21, 2017, a landslide blocked the road that provides access to the hot springs from the north. The road will be closed indefinitely. At the time, southern access was blocked by winter road conditions and construction, making the hot springs inaccessible to the public.

On August 19, 2018, a fire was reported in the area near Terwilliger Hot Springs. The fire damaged the trail to the springs and the surrounding area. The hot springs were re-opened on July 1, 2019.

=== Incidents ===
By the late 90s, issues developed including loud parties during the night, theft, alcohol abuse and drug dealing, as well as vandalism and littering. The Forest Service made several studies of the site in 1978–79, and improved it by building a posted trail, prohibiting nudity along the roads, as well as camping in the parking lot. The problems continued and the site was frequented by "various cult groups, motorcycle gangs, and ex-convicts". Theft and armed robbery were reported in the parking lot. The problems improved following a 1982 study of the site by Chuck Anderson, a Forest Service worker and James L. Caswell, who was a Blue River District Ranger resulting in the area being managed by the Forest Service, the implementation of a day-use fee, with oversight by a non-profit organization, Friends of the Springs, to regulate and monitor its use. The organization provided a caretaker present to maintain trails, clean toilets, and manage a small camping area. The FOS worked with the and Forest Service to construct wooden decks around the soaking pools, and to build a caretaker's cabin. The project was successful for the first two years of operations.

In 1994, the body of a deceased young woman with a fractured skull was found near the parking lot having apparently drowned after falling. In 1996, the murder of a Harrisburg man occurred after a "transient" stole the man's motor home while travelling back to town from the hot springs. The same year a man who was camping was shot in the head during a fight about noise at the campground. In 1998, a day-use fee was implemented by the forestry service, alcohol use was banned and night use and overnight camping was prohibited within a nine-mile radius. In 2020 a woman died from a "medical event" at the hot springs while visiting with two friends. She was 25 years of age.

== See also ==
- List of hot springs in the United States
