= Mink (surname) =

Mink is a surname. Notable people with the surname include:

- Ben Mink (born 1951), Canadian musician
- Claudette Mink (born 1971), Canadian actress
- Douglas J. Mink, American scientist
- Graham Mink (born 1979), American ice hockey player
- James Mink, Canadian businessman and politician
- Len Mink, Christian evangelist and musician
- Louis Mink (1921–1983), American philosopher of history
- Patsy Mink (1927–2002), American politician
- Meesha Mink, pseudonym of Niobia Bryant, an African-American novelist of romance and mainstream fiction
- Ken Mink (born 1935), American who, at the age of 73, is believed to be the oldest person ever to score in a college basketball game
- Oscar Mink (1930–2004), American academic
- Paule Mink (died 1901), born Adèle Paulina Mekarska, was a French feminist and socialist revolutionary
- Olivér Mink (born 1970), Hungarian retired football player and football coach, currently the head coach of Hungarian first division club Pécsi MFC
- Wilhelm Mink, German entomologist.
