= Salvelinus curilus =

Southern Dolly Varden

Conservation status
- Least Concern (IUCN 3.1)

Scientific classification
- Kingdom: Animalia
- Phylum: Chordata
- Class: Actinopterygii
- Division: Teleostei
- Order: Salmoniformes
- Family: Salmonidae
- Genus: Salvelinus
- Species: S. curilus

Binomial name
- Salvelinus curilus (Pallas, 1814)

Synonyms
- Salvelinus malma krascheninnikova Taranetz, 1933; Salvelinus fariopsis (Kner, 1870)

Species of fish

Salvelinus curilus is a species of anadromous fish in the salmon family. It inhabits the waters of Russian Far East in the Kurile Islands, Sakhalin, Primorye and also Korea and Japan. It has mostly been considered a subspecies of the Dolly Varden trout Salvelinus malma, with the name Salvelinus malma krascheninnikova, and referred to as the southern Dolly Varden or Asian southern form Dolly Varden trout.

This species has a mitochondrial DNA lineage clearly distinct from that of the northern Dolly Varden S. malma, and the latter is closer to the Arctic char Salvelinus alpinus. The southern and northern Dolly Varden also have clear karyological differences. Nevertheless, there has been gene exchange between the southern and northern Dolly Varden populations.
