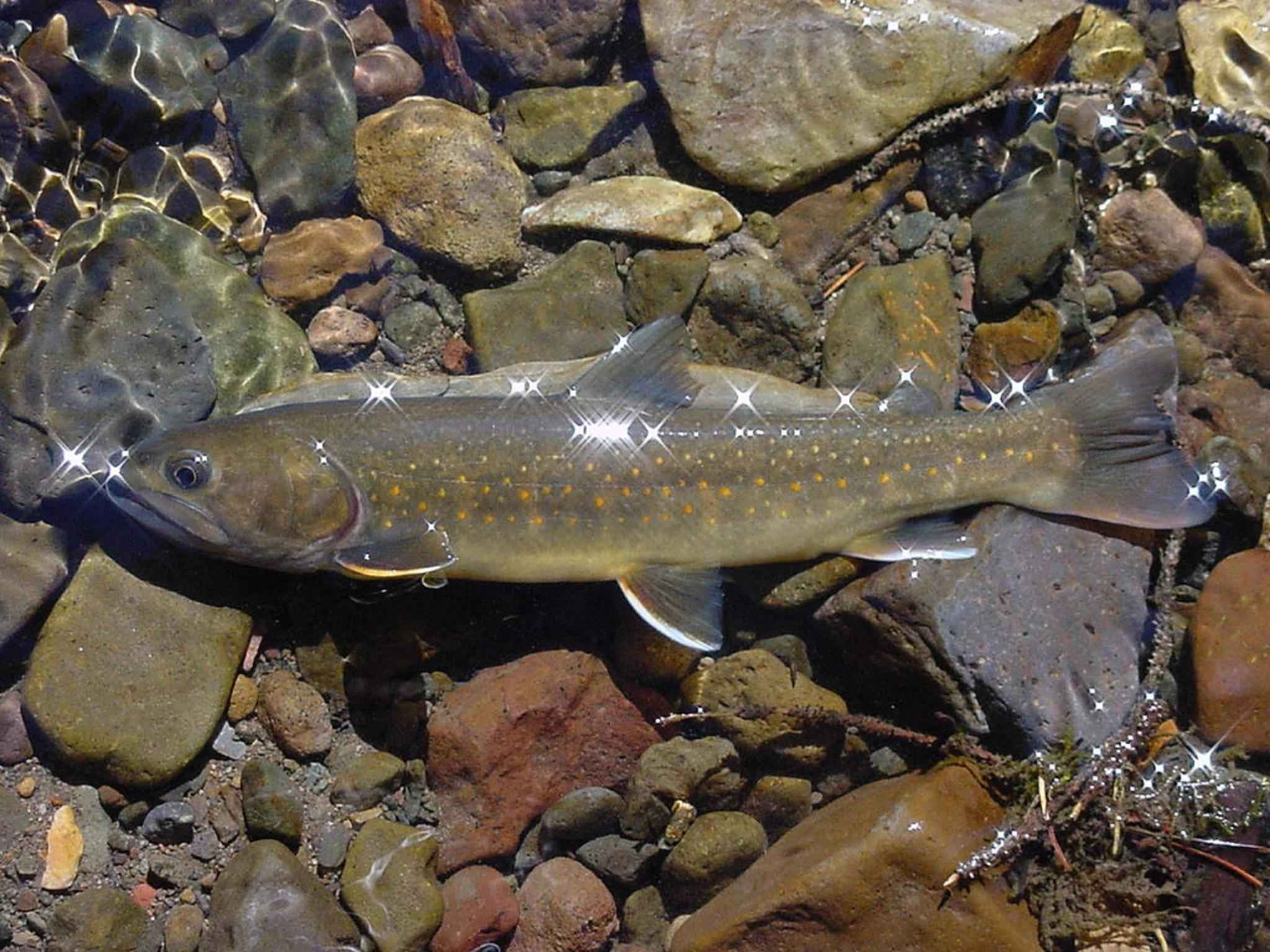

Conservation status
- Vulnerable (IUCN 2.3)

- Vulnerable (NatureServe)

Scientific classification
- Kingdom: Animalia
- Phylum: Chordata
- Class: Actinopterygii
- Division: Teleostei
- Order: Salmoniformes
- Family: Salmonidae
- Genus: Salvelinus
- Species: S. confluentus

Binomial name
- Salvelinus confluentus Suckley, 1859

= Bull trout =

Species of fish

The bull trout (Salvelinus confluentus) is a char of the family Salmonidae native to northwestern North America. Historically, S. confluentus has been known as the "Dolly Varden" (S. malma), but was reclassified as a separate species in 1980. Populations of bull trout in the lower 48 states are listed as threatened under the U.S. Endangered Species Act, and bull trout overall are listed as vulnerable to extinction on the IUCN Red List of Threatened Species. The Saskatchewan-Nelson Rivers population in Alberta, Canada is listed as threatened under the Species at Risk Act.

== Description ==
Like other species of char, the fins of a bull trout have white leading edges. Its head and mouth are unusually large for salmonids, giving it its name. Bull trout have been recorded measuring up to 103 cm (41 in) in length and weighing 14.5 kg (32 lb). Bull trout may be either migratory, moving throughout large river systems, lakes, and the ocean, or they may be resident, remaining in the same stream their entire lives. Migratory bull trout are typically much larger than resident bull trout, which rarely exceed 2 kg (4.4 lb). Bull trout can be differentiated from brook trout (S. fontinalis) by the absence of distinct spots on the dorsal fin, as well as yellow, orange, or salmon-colored spots on the back as opposed to red spots with blue halos on the brook trout. Bull trout lack the deeply forked tail fin of lake trout (S. namaycush, another char).

== Distribution and habitat ==
Core distribution of bull trout (Salvelinus confluentus) in U.S. 2005

S. confluentus is found in the cold, clear waters of the high mountains and coastal rivers of northwestern North America, including Yukon, Alberta, British Columbia, Washington, Oregon, Idaho, and western Montana, as well as the Jarbidge River of northern Nevada and perhaps Alaska. A population of bull trout exists east of the Continental Divide in Alberta, where it is the provincial fish. The historical range of bull trout also included northern California, but they are likely extirpated.

Bull trout have exacting habitat demands, requiring water temperatures generally below 55 °F (13 °C), clean gravel beds, deep pools, complex cover such as snags and cut banks, and large systems of interconnected waterways to accommodate spawning migrations. Thus, they favor the deep pools of cold lakes and large rivers, as well as high, cold mountain headwaters. Bull trout may be anadromous in coastal rivers, and individual bull trout have been found to have migrated from one coastal river to another by the ocean.

== Dispersal ==
Bull trout are known for their extensive movements within river systems. They exhibit short-distance and long-distance movements, which are crucial in maintaining healthy populations and genetic diversity. During the early life stages, bull trout are often found in small, low-gradient streams or near the shores of larger rivers and lakes. As they grow and mature, they start to disperse in search of suitable spawning grounds and feeding habitats.

One of the primary reasons for bull trout dispersal is the need to find appropriate spawning areas. Bull trout rely on clean, cold water and gravels of specific sizes for successful reproduction. Once mature, they migrate upstream to spawn in the same streams where they were born. This behavior ensures that the population remains connected and allows for the exchange of genetic material. The dispersal distances can vary greatly, with some individuals traveling only a few miles while others undertake extensive migrations of over a hundred miles.

Long-distance dispersal is also an essential aspect of bull trout ecology. These movements often occur during the non-spawning season when the fish search for suitable feeding grounds or escape unfavorable conditions such as high water temperatures or low oxygen levels. In some cases, bull trout have been observed moving between different river basins, crossing over mountain ranges, and even traversing large lakes. These long-distance dispersal events contribute to gene flow between isolated populations, maintaining genetic diversity and increasing the species' resilience.

Understanding bull trout dispersal patterns is crucial for effective conservation and management strategies. Conservation efforts can be focused on protecting critical habitats and maintaining connectivity between populations. Conservation biologists use various techniques to study bull trout dispersal, including radio telemetry, genetic analysis, and mark-recapture studies. By tracking the movements of individual fish and analyzing their genetic makeup, researchers can gain valuable insights into dispersal patterns, population dynamics, and potential barriers to migration.

Bull trout dispersal is a complex and vital aspect of their life history. Their movements are critical to maintaining population connectivity, genetic diversity, and ecosystem health. Protecting and restoring essential habitats, ensuring the connectivity of river systems, and managing anthropogenic influences in bull trout habitats are all crucial steps in conserving this iconic species.

== Feeding ==
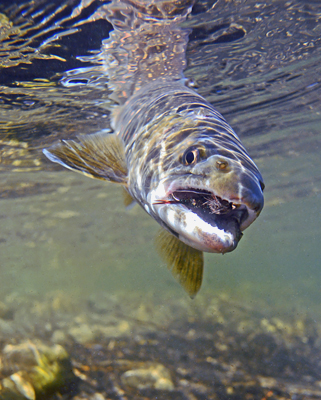
Bull trout feeding

Young bull trout feed on zooplankton and zoobenthos, especially chironomids. As they grow larger, they begin to feed heavily upon other fish. In coastal Washington, some of the southernmost populations of bull trout feed heavily on salmon eggs and fry, as well as fish.

== Conservation ==
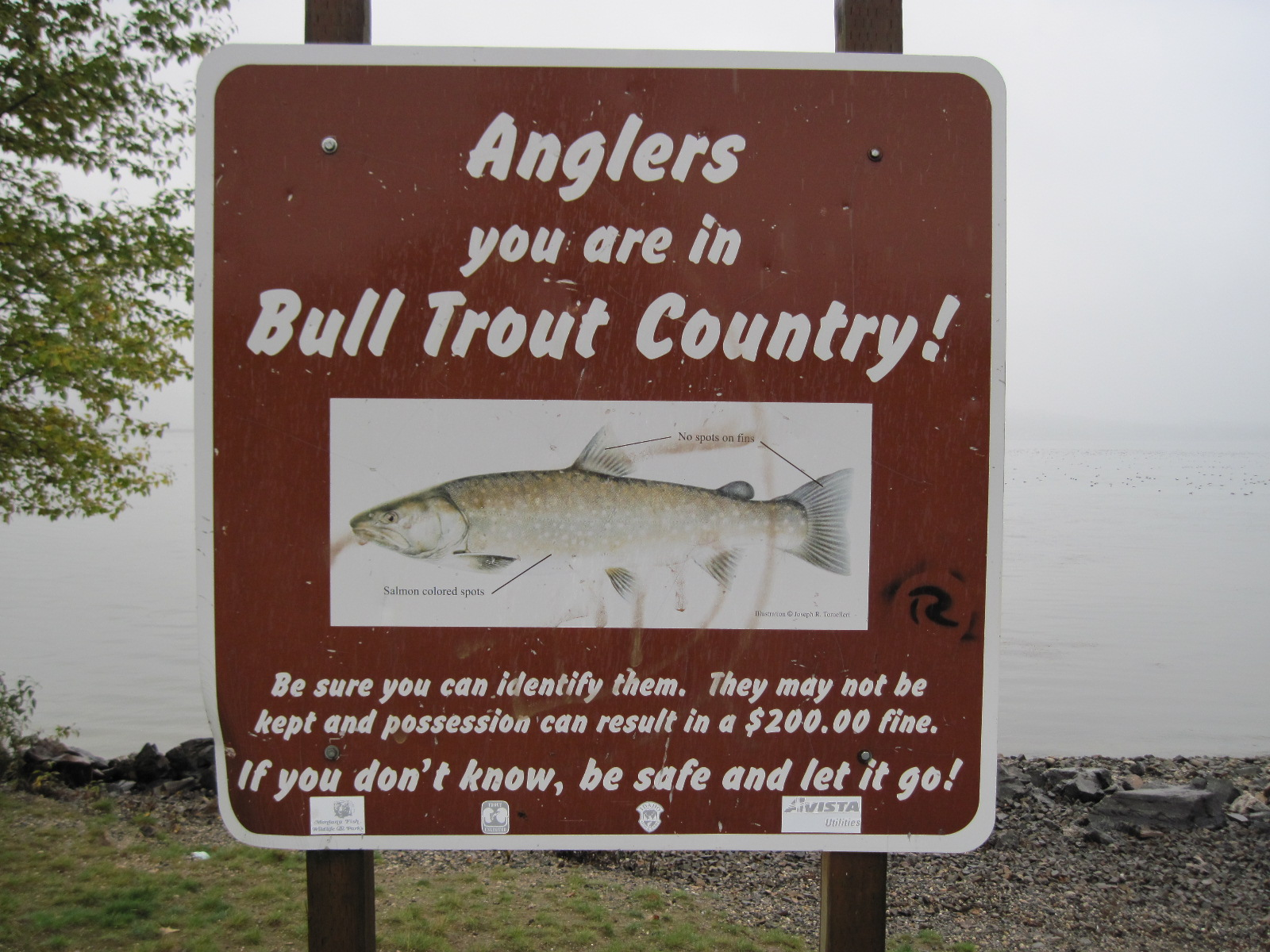
Bull trout sign at Lake Pend Oreille in Idaho

The bull trout is listed as a threatened species under the U.S. Endangered Species Act throughout its range in the contiguous United States. In 1998, the Klamath River distinct population segment (DPS) and Columbia River DPS were federally listed as threatened. This finding followed a legal challenge to the U.S. Fish & Wildlife Service's (USFWS) decision in 1994 to assign a lower priority to the species' listing. The Jarbidge River DPS was listed as endangered under an emergency rule in 1998, and was subsequently downgraded to threatened in 1999. Finally, in determining that the Coastal-Puget Sound and St. Mary-Belly River DPS were threatened, the USFWS issued a threatened listing for all bull trout in the lower 48 states in 1999.

In the United States, bull trout are used as a management indicator species for several national forests, including Boise National Forest and Sawtooth National Forest (Sawtooth National Recreation Area). They can also be found in the Glacier National Park. Bull trout reproduction requires cold water and very low amounts of silt, both of which are negatively impacted by road building and logging. Additionally, its need to migrate throughout river systems may be hindered by impassible fish barriers, such as dams. Bull trout populations are also in danger from hybridization with non-native brook trout. Several of these issues were raised in a long-running lawsuit where in 2003, the Oregon Natural Desert Association and the Center for Biological Diversity sued the U.S. Forest Service claiming they violated the National Forest Management Act and Wild and Scenic Rivers Act by approving grazing plans in Oregon's Malheur National Forest. In April 2018, U.S. District Judge Michael W. Mosman dismissed the complaint.

They are a prized game fish in northern Canada. It was once maligned out of fear they threatened populations of other native species more prized by anglers. Some jurisdictions publicize the requirement to release with the slogan "No black, put it back".

Within Canada, bull trout have been designated as a "species of Special Concern" by both the Government of Alberta and the Government of British Columbia. By the recommendation of COSEWIC, the Saskatchewan-Nelson Rivers population in Alberta was listed as threatened under the Species at Risk Act in 2019.

== Historical names ==
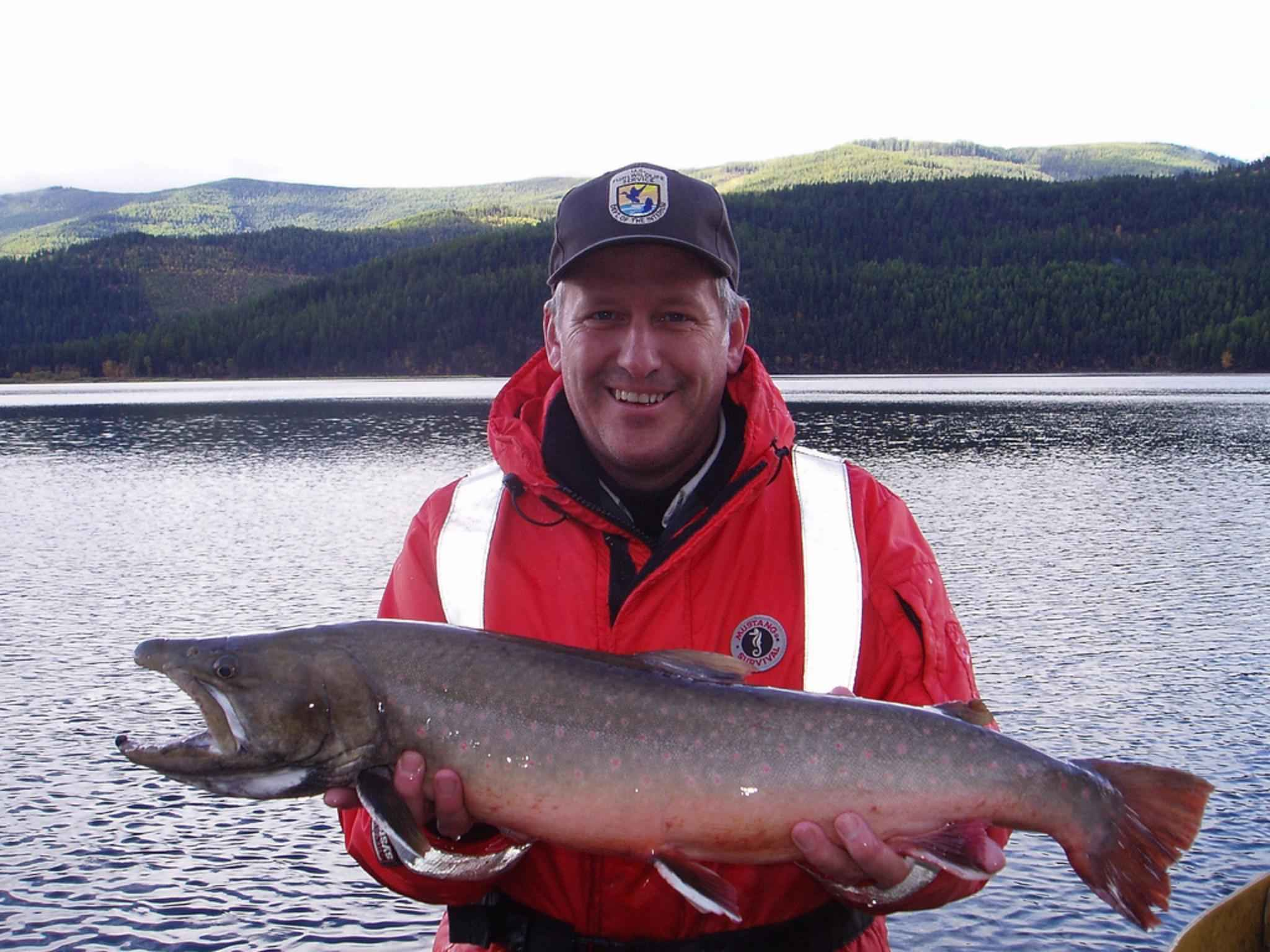
Fisherman with a big bull trout

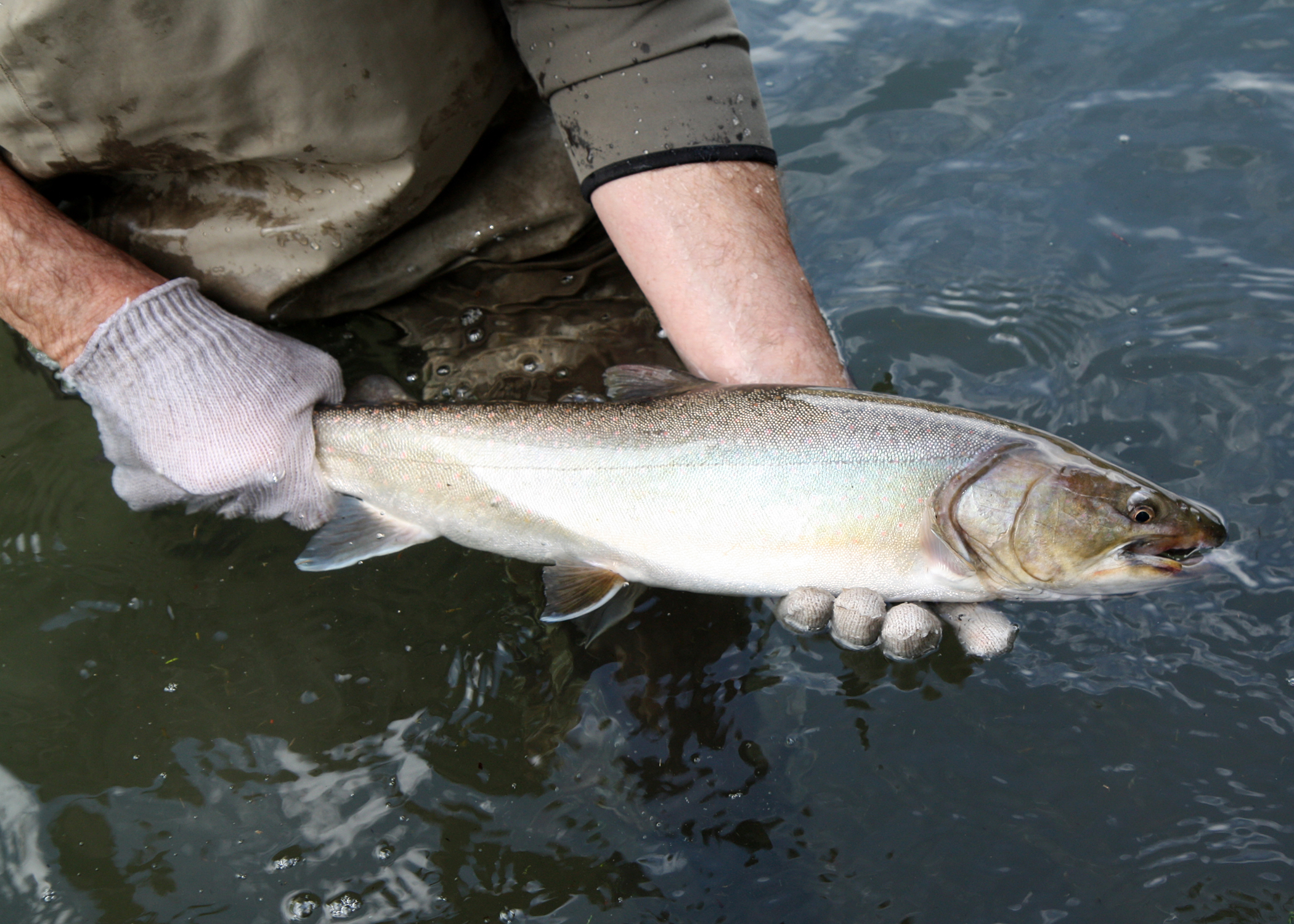
ODFW sampling bull trout on Oregon's Metolius River

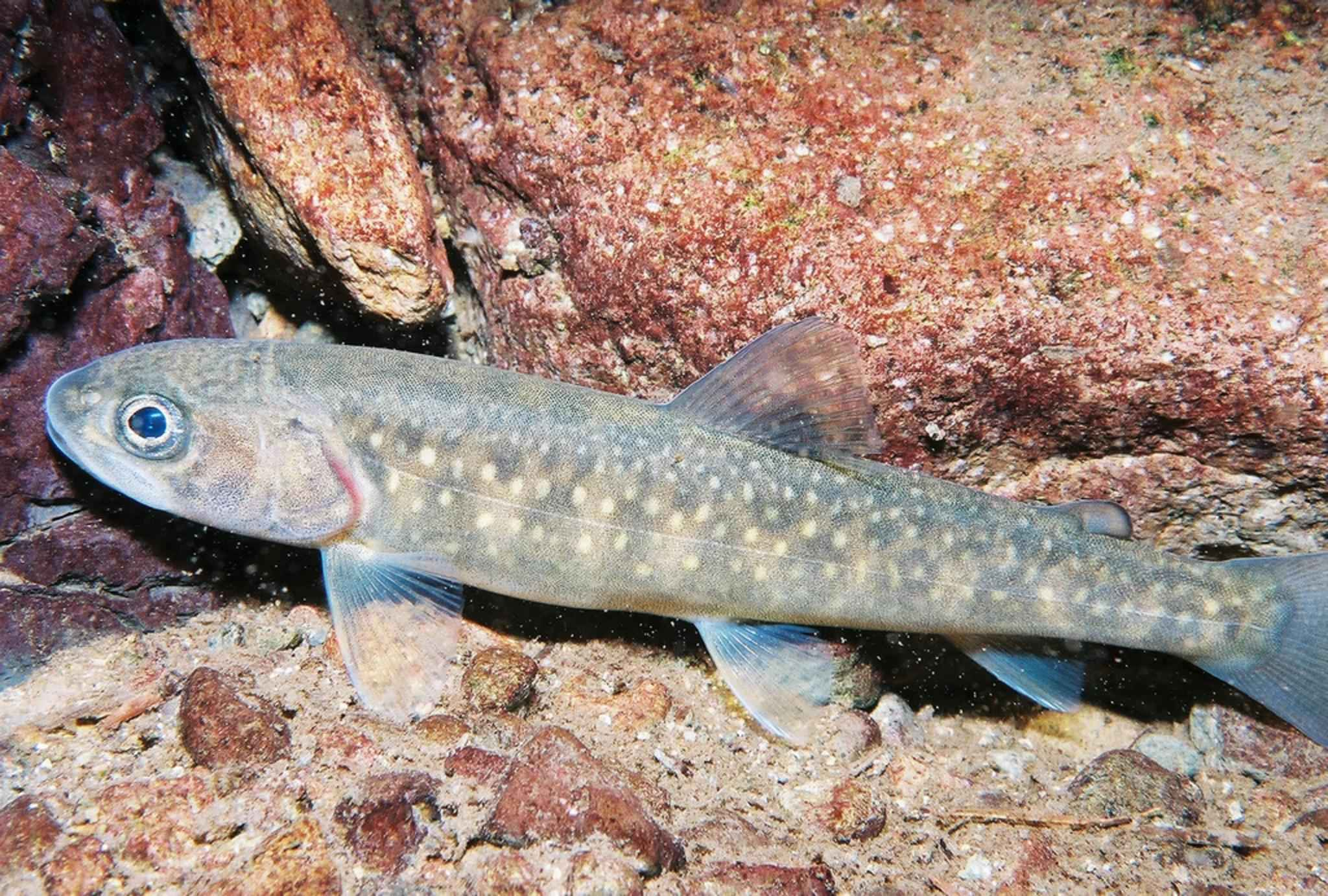
A juvenile bull trout resting underwater

Anadromous bull trout at the Vedder River

=== "Dolly Varden" in California ===
Historically, confusion has existed between S. confluentus and Salvelinus malma malma, today commonly called the Dolly Varden trout. This was likely due to overlapping ranges and similar appearances among members of the two species.

The first recorded use of the name "Dolly Varden" for a fish species was applied to members of S. confluentus caught in the McCloud River in northern California in the early 1870s. In his book Inland Fishes of California, Peter Moyle recounted a letter from Mrs. Valerie Masson Gomez:

My grandmother's family operated a summer resort at Upper Soda Springs on the Sacramento River just north of the present town of Dunsmuir, California. She lived there all her life and related to us in her later years her story about the naming of the Dolly Varden trout. She said that some fishermen were standing on the lawn at Upper Soda Springs looking at a catch of the large trout from the McCloud River that were called 'calico trout' because of their spotted, colorful markings. They were saying that the trout should have a better name. My grandmother, then a young girl of 15 or 16, had been reading Charles Dickens' Barnaby Rudge in which there appears a character named Dolly Varden; also, the vogue in fashion for women at that time (middle 1870s) was called 'Dolly Varden', a dress of sheer figured muslin worn over a bright-colored petticoat. My grandmother had just gotten a new dress in that style and the red-spotted trout reminded her of her printed dress. She suggested to the men looking down at the trout, 'Why not call them "Dolly Varden"?' They thought it a very appropriate name and the guests that summer returned to their homes (many in the San Francisco Bay area) calling the trout by this new name. David Starr Jordan, while at Stanford University, included an account of this naming of the Dolly Varden trout in one of his books.

In 1874, Livingston Stone, a naturalist working for the U.S. government, wrote of this fish:

Also called at (Upper) Soda Springs the 'Varden' trout. … The handsomest trout, and, on the whole, having the most perfect form of all the trout we saw on the McCloud. Also, the only fish that had colored spots. This one was profusely spotted over most of the body with redish [sic?] golden spots. ... The local name at (Upper) Soda Springs is the Dolly Varden.

It is currently unknown whether the name "Dolly Varden" was later applied to S. m. malma because of its similar appearance to S. confluentus; the two may have even been believed to be the same species. The name "Dolly Varden" may have also been given to S. m. malma independent of the McCloud River fish.

Ironically, the original "Dolly Varden" trout (i.e., S. confluentus) apparently likely became extirpated in the McCloud River in the 1970s, although reports continue of its being caught. Other fish species, typically introduced trout, outcompete S. confluentus, and can interbreed with them, resulting in sterile hybrids. An attempt to reintroduce S. confluentus to the McCloud was unsuccessful, and no additional attempts are expected.

=== Other uses of "Dolly Varden" ===
The "Dolly Varden" name is also applied to the other subspecies of S. malma, the S. m. krascheninnikova, and S. m. miyabei, found in Lake Shikaribetsu on the island of Hokkaidō in Japan.

The name has also been applied to S. alpinus, today more commonly known as Arctic char.

=== "Bull trout" in Europe ===
The name "bull trout" was also given in the past to some of the large sea trout that run the River Tweed and other rivers in Scotland and North East England. Victorian anglers and others classified these as a separate race, but today they are biologically classified along with all other UK brown and sea trout as Salmo trutta. This does not deny that populations of S. trutta can differ appreciably in habits, size, and appearance from place to place, or indeed in the same river or lake.
