= Mink Lake (Lane County, Oregon) =

Lake in Oregon, United States

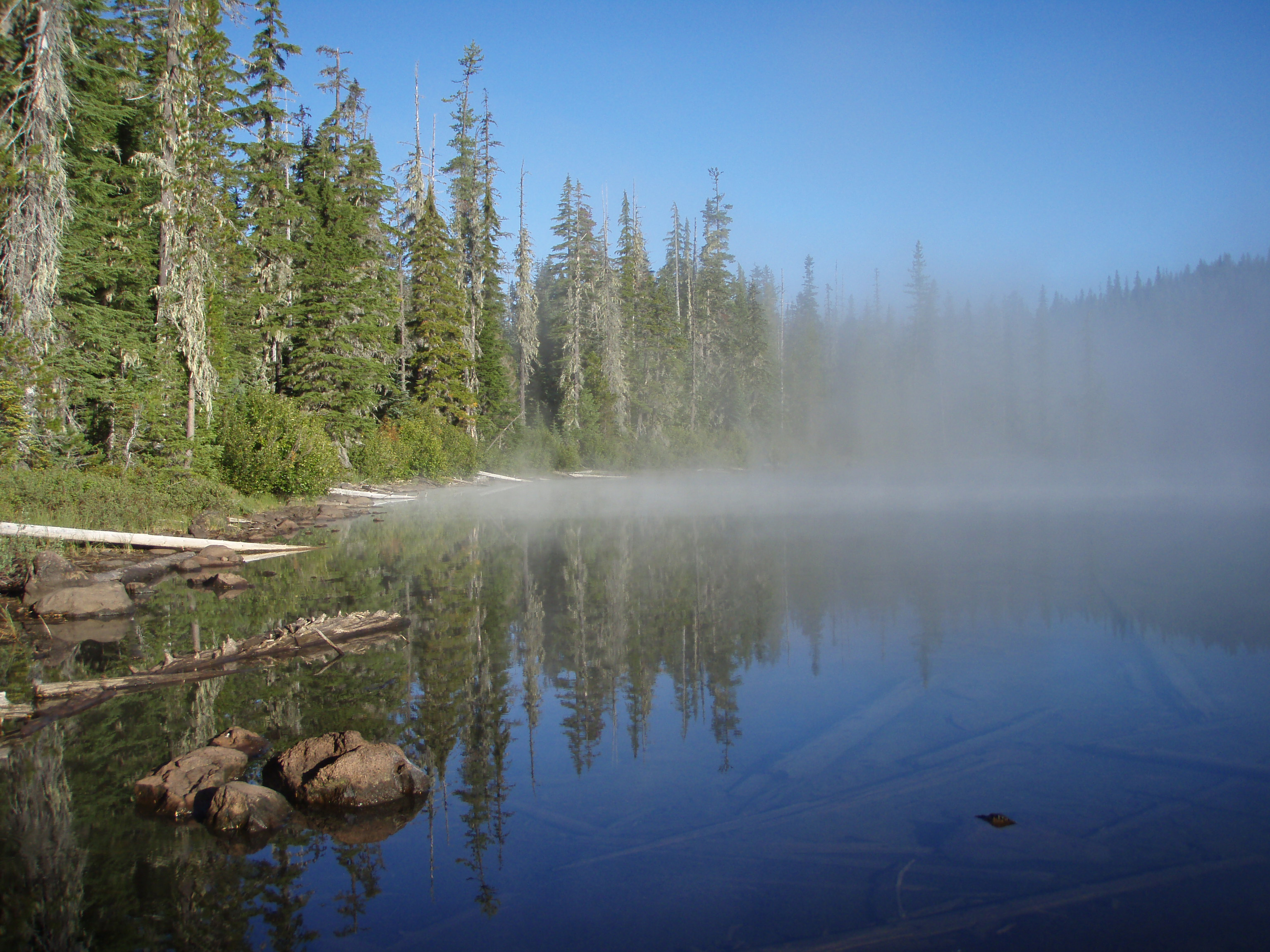
- Fog on Mink Lake

- Location within Oregon Location within the United States
- Location: Lane County, Oregon, United States
- Coordinates: 43.93028°N 121.92361°W
- Type: Natural, ultraoligotrophic
- Catchment area: 0.9 square miles (2.3 km^{2})
- Basin countries: United States
- Surface area: 139 acres (56 ha)
- Average depth: 37 feet (11 m)
- Max. depth: 85 feet (26 m)
- Water volume: 5,200 acre-feet (6,400,000 m^{3})
- Surface elevation: 5,039 feet (1,536 m)

Mink Lake is the second-largest wilderness lake in the US state of Oregon. (Note: Marion Lake is the largest.) Mink Lake lies at about 5,000 feet (1,500 m) above sea level on a Cascade Range lava plateau in the Three Sisters Wilderness in eastern Lane County. One of many lakes in the Mink Lake Basin, it covers 139 acres (56 ha).

Hiking trails enter the Mink Lake Basin, at the headwaters of the South Fork McKenzie River, from many directions. The Pacific Crest Trail runs roughly north–south about 1 mile (1.6 km) east of the lake. Natural campsites abound in the area, but in warm weather mosquitoes can be a problem.

So few chemicals and nutrients enter this lake that it is classified as ultraoligotrophic, and it is thought to be among the most pristine lakes in Oregon. Fishing is possible here mainly because of stocking. Rainbow and cutthroat trout range in size from 6 to 12 inches (15 to 30 cm).

== See also ==
- List of lakes of Oregon

== Notes and references ==
Notes
