= Dolly Varden =

Dolly Varden may refer to:

- Dolly Varden (character), a character in the 1841 novel Barnaby Rudge by Charles Dickens.

== Aquatic species ==
- Dolly Varden trout, Salvelinus malma malma, a fish found in coastal waters of the North Pacific
- Southern Dolly Varden, Salvelinus malma krascheninnikova, a subspecies of migrating fish
- Dolly Varden crab, Hepatus epheliticus, a colorful marine crab
- Dolly Varden, a local name for the Bull trout, Salvelinus confluentus

== Places ==
- the mine associated with the settlement of Kitsault, British Columbia
- Dolly Varden, Ohio, a community in the United States
- Dolly Varden Mountains, a mountain range in Elko County, Nevada
- Mana, New Zealand — originally called "Dolly Varden"

== Other uses ==
- Dolly Varden (painting), an 1842 painting by William Powell Frith
- Dolly Vardens (baseball team), a name adopted by a number of 19th-century baseball clubs
- Dolly Vardens (political party), a California Anti-Monopoly Party, electing Newton Booth to the U.S. Senate
- Dolly Varden (band), a musical group from Chicago, Illinois
- Dolly Varden (costume), a style of women's clothing fashionable from about 1869 to 1875
- Dolly Varden, a boat of the Wellington Rowing Club
- Dolly Varden (yacht), a racing yacht built 1872 now under restoration
- Dolly Varden cake
- Dolly Varden Line, nickname of the Chicago, Attica and Southern Railroad in Indiana
