= Dolly Varden (costume) =

Type of women's costume

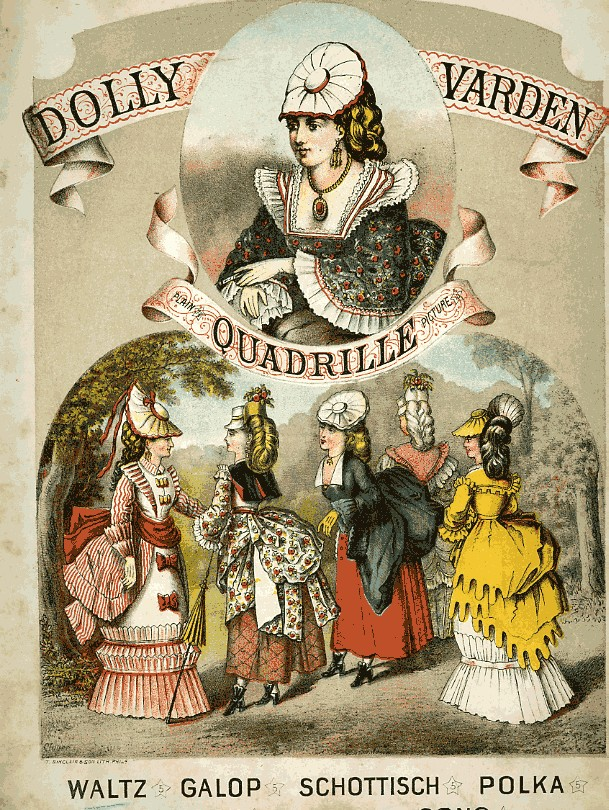
Music sheet cover depicting women wearing Dolly Varden costumes.

A Dolly Varden, in this sense, is a woman's outfit fashionable from about 1869 to 1875 in Britain and the United States. It is named after a character in Charles Dickens, and the items of clothing referred to are usually a hat or dress.

== Name ==
Dolly Varden is a character from Charles Dickens's 1841 historical novel Barnaby Rudge set in 1780. The Dolly Varden costume was an 1870s version of fashions of the 1770s and 1780s.

== Fashion ==
The term "Dolly Varden" in dress is generally understood to mean a brightly patterned, usually flowered, dress with a polonaise overskirt gathered up and draped over a separate underskirt. The overdress is typically made from printed cotton or chintz, although it can be made from other materials such as lightweight wool, silk and muslin. An 1869 fashion doll in the collection of the V&A Museum of Childhood is dressed in the Dolly Varden mode; unusually the outfit is in dark colours. The Gallery of Costume in Manchester holds a more typical Dolly Varden dress in its collections, made of white linen with a pink and mauve flowered print.

A Dolly Varden hat, as it relates to the dress, is usually understood to mean a flat straw hat trimmed with flowers and ribbons, very like the 18th-century bergère hat. It is also closely related to the Pamela hat or "gipsy hat" that was popular during the earlier part of the century.

Although the typical Dolly Varden fashion of the large overskirt and polonaise died out with changes in fashion at the turn of the century, the names continued to be associated with chintz patterned fabrics and peplum style dresses. Even in the late 1930s, chintz patterned fashions might still have the name 'Dolly Varden' attached to them.

== Popular culture ==
The Dolly Varden fashion fad inspired many popular songs, such as G. W. Moore's "Dressed in a Dolly Varden" and Alfred Lee's novelty song, "Dolly Varden" (published Cleveland, 1872), which contains the lyrics:

Have you seen my little girl? She doesn’t wear a bonnet.
She's got a monstrous flip-flop hat with cherry ribbons on it.
She dresses in bed furniture just like a flower garden
A blowin' and a growin' and they call it Dolly Varden.

In the 1870s, the Theatre Royal in London presented an entertainment called The Dolly Varden Polka, composed by W. C. Levey.

Writing in 1880, Charles Bardsley reports that the forename Dolly (as a diminutive of Dorothy) had enjoyed peaks of popularity in England from 1450 to 1570 and again from 1750 to 1820, but had since fallen into decline. He continues: "Once more Dolly, saving for Dora, has made her bow and exit. I suppose she may turn up again about 1990, and all the little girls will be wearing Dolly Vardens."

A notable use of the name in theatre was Dolly Varden, a comic opera starring Lulu Glaser, which opened in 1902. Although the main character conforms to the Dickens character, the play itself is based on William Wycherley's The Country Wife, first performed in 1675.

In Balthazar (1958), the second novel in Lawrence Durrell's Alexandria Quartet, Scobie, a gay Binbashi, tells the protagonist Darley that when he cross-dresses he wears a Dolly Varden hat.

The fashion led to the naming of the Dolly Varden trout and Dolly Varden crab.

The name is also commemorated in the Dolly Varden cake. One recipe features in the 1980 Australian Women's Weekly Children's Birthday Cake Book. Also known as a 'Princess Cake', the modern Dolly Varden cake uses the torso of a doll (sometimes called a doll pick) inserted into a conical cake which is then decorated as the doll's dress. 'Dolly Varden' aluminium cake tins are now broadly available from cookware retailers for this purpose. The name for the cake no doubt developed from the Dolly Varden dress. However, in the late 19th century, the Dolly Varden cake was different. Many recipes call for a double layered cake with one layer as a lemon or vanilla cake and the other as a rich spice or fruit cake. Chunks of cherries in the cake were often used to mimic the chintz of the fashion.

== Gallery ==
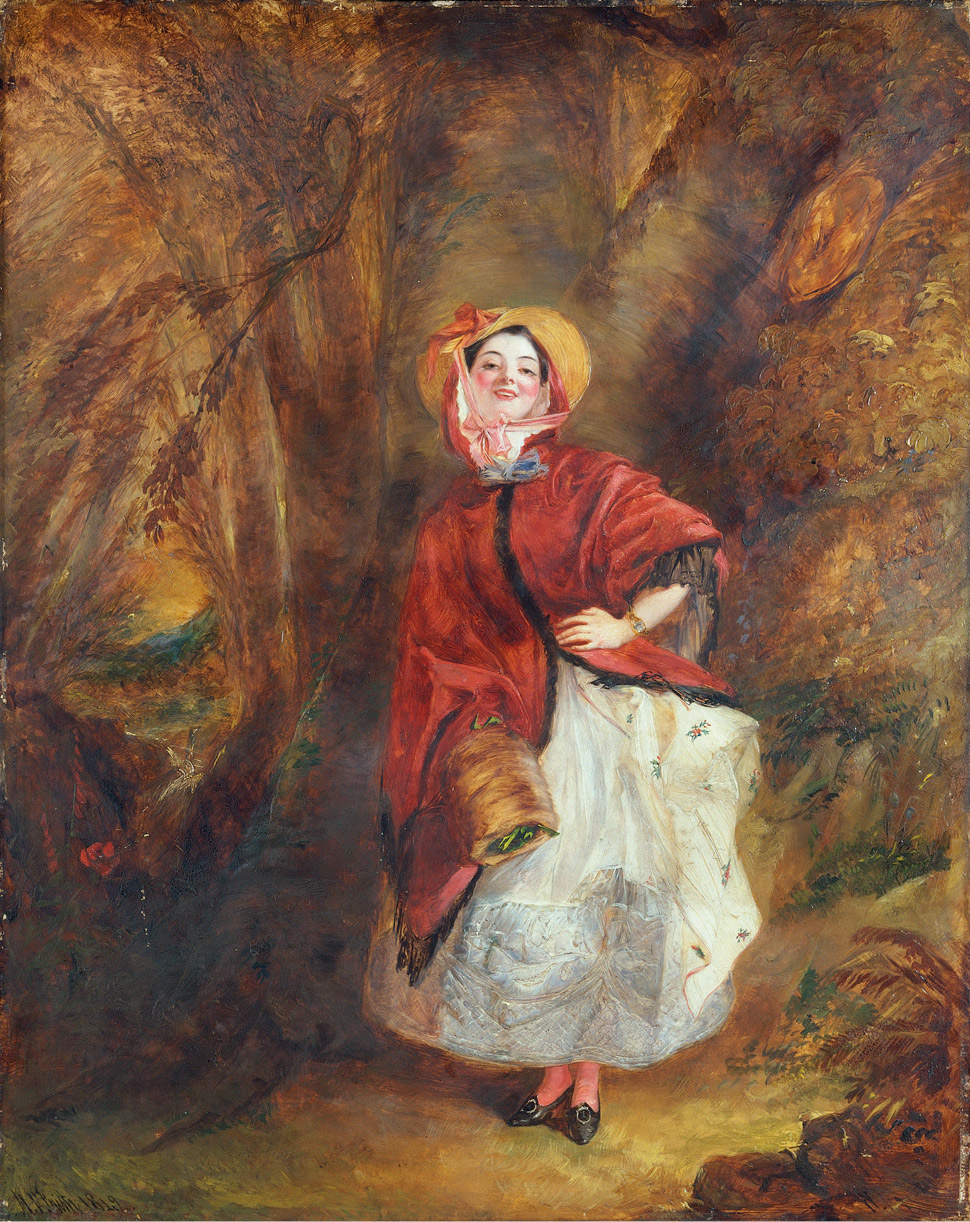
Dolly Varden (the character) as painted by William Powell Frith, 1842

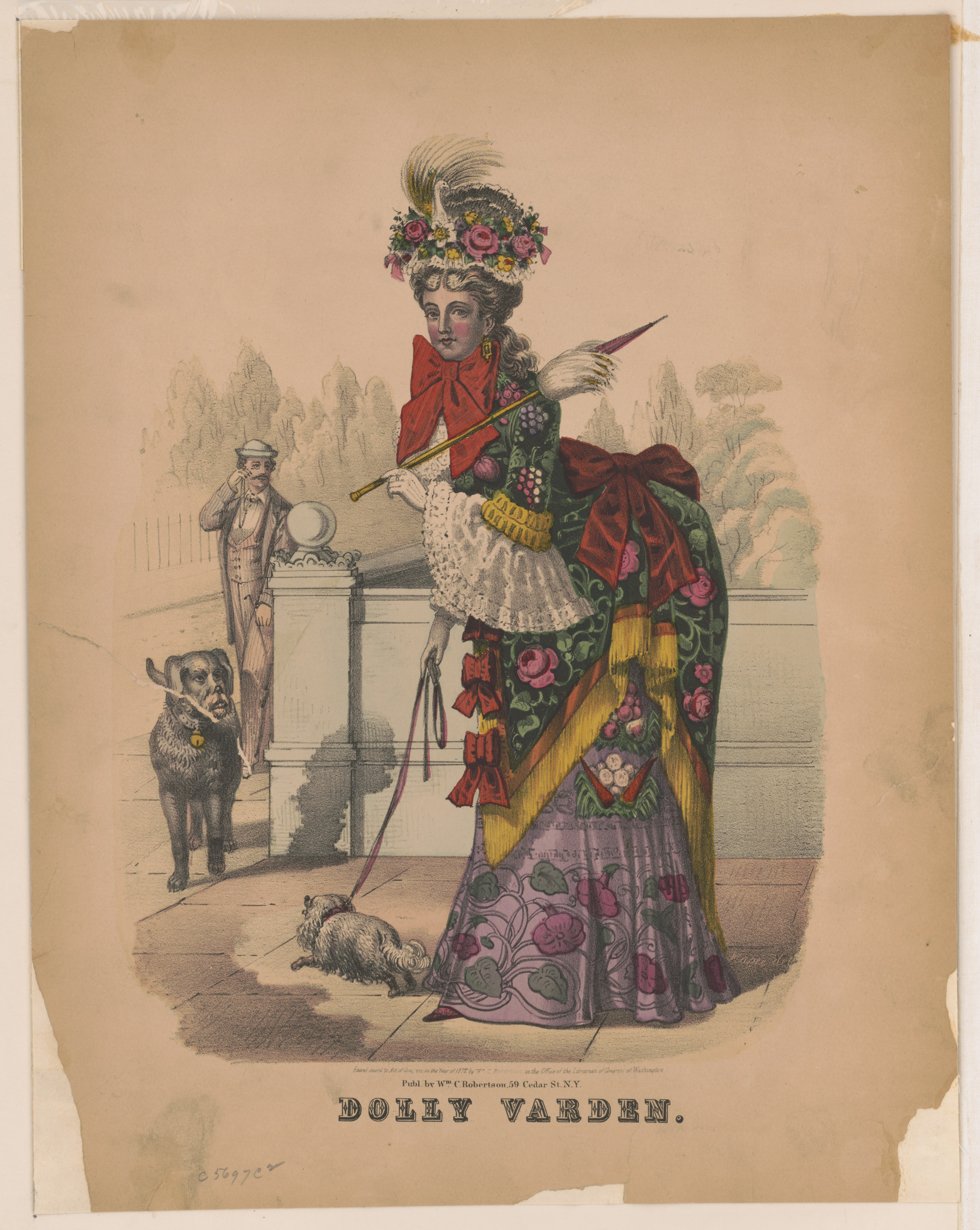
Print of woman in Dolly Varden costume, c.1872

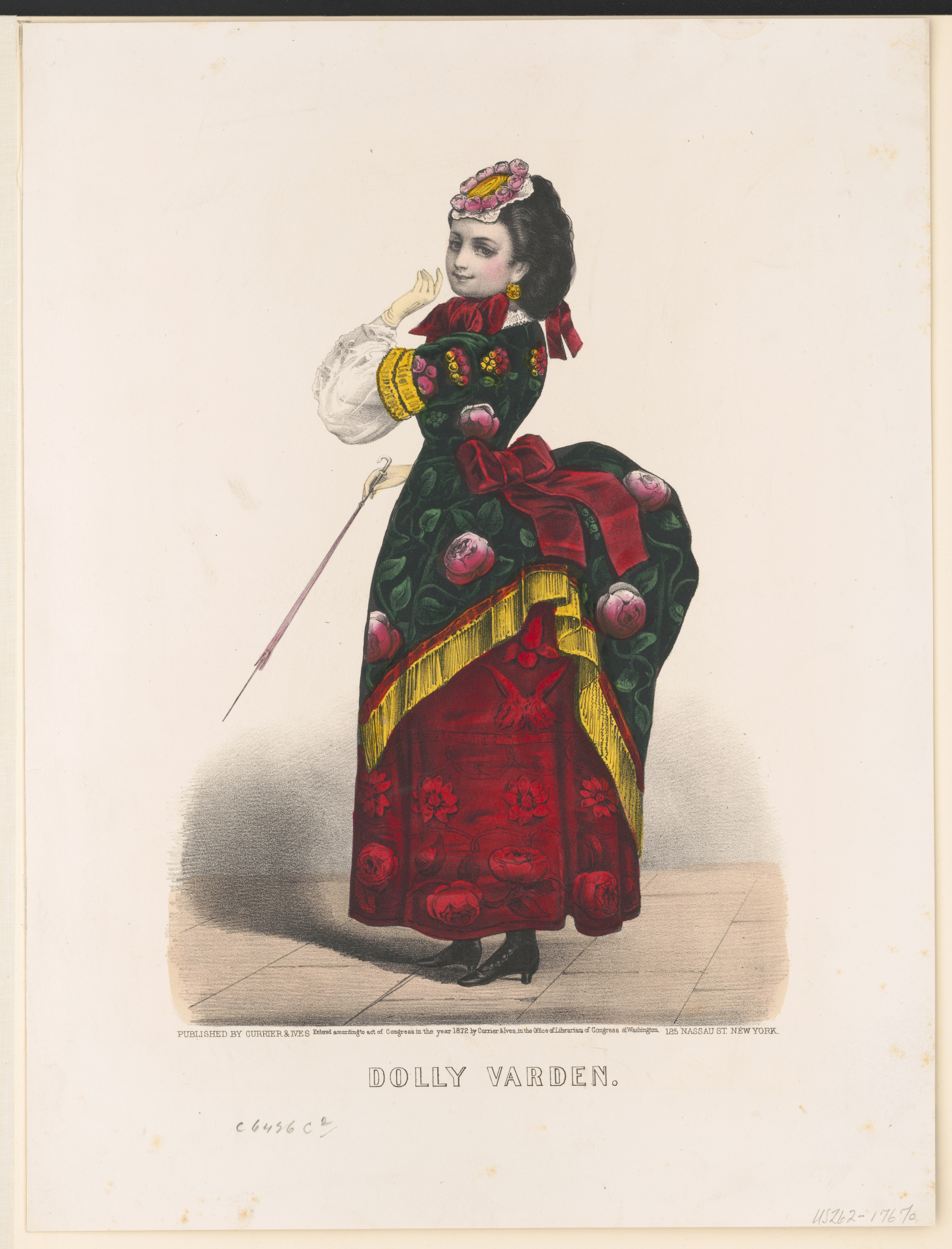
Lithograph of woman in Dolly Varden costume, 1872
