= Dolly Varden cake =

Layer cake

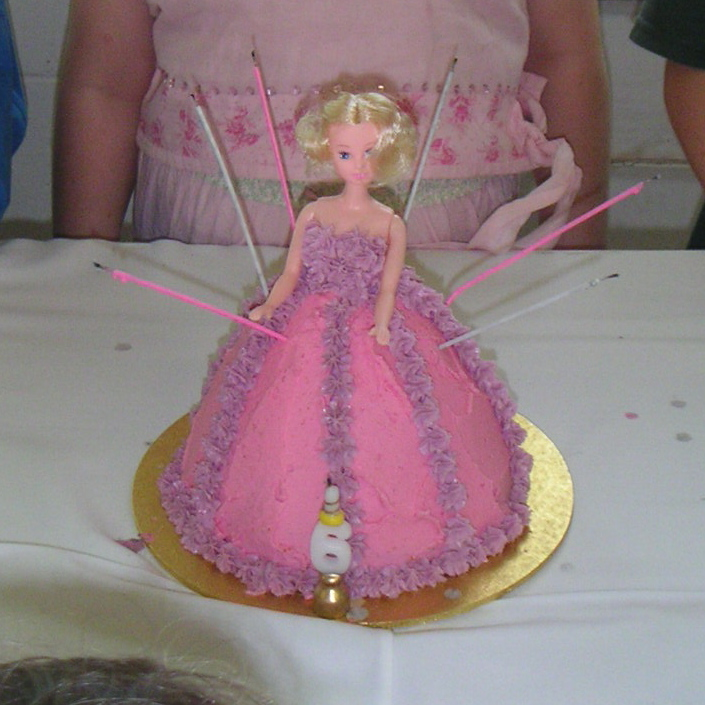
A modern, Australian Dolly Varden cake

A Dolly Varden cake is a layer cake, today often formed and decorated to resemble a doll wearing a dress. It is named for the Charles Dickens character Dolly Varden, who appears in his 1841 novel Barnaby Rudge and who inspired a fashion fad in the 1870s. The cake was invented in America and became popular in Australia as a layered dessert featuring contrasting colours and flavours. In Australia today, the cake is known by names including Barbie Cake, Dolly Cake and Princess Doll Cake, and is generally made from cake mix with a doll embedded in the top. It is particularly associated with the birthday parties of young girls.

== Background ==
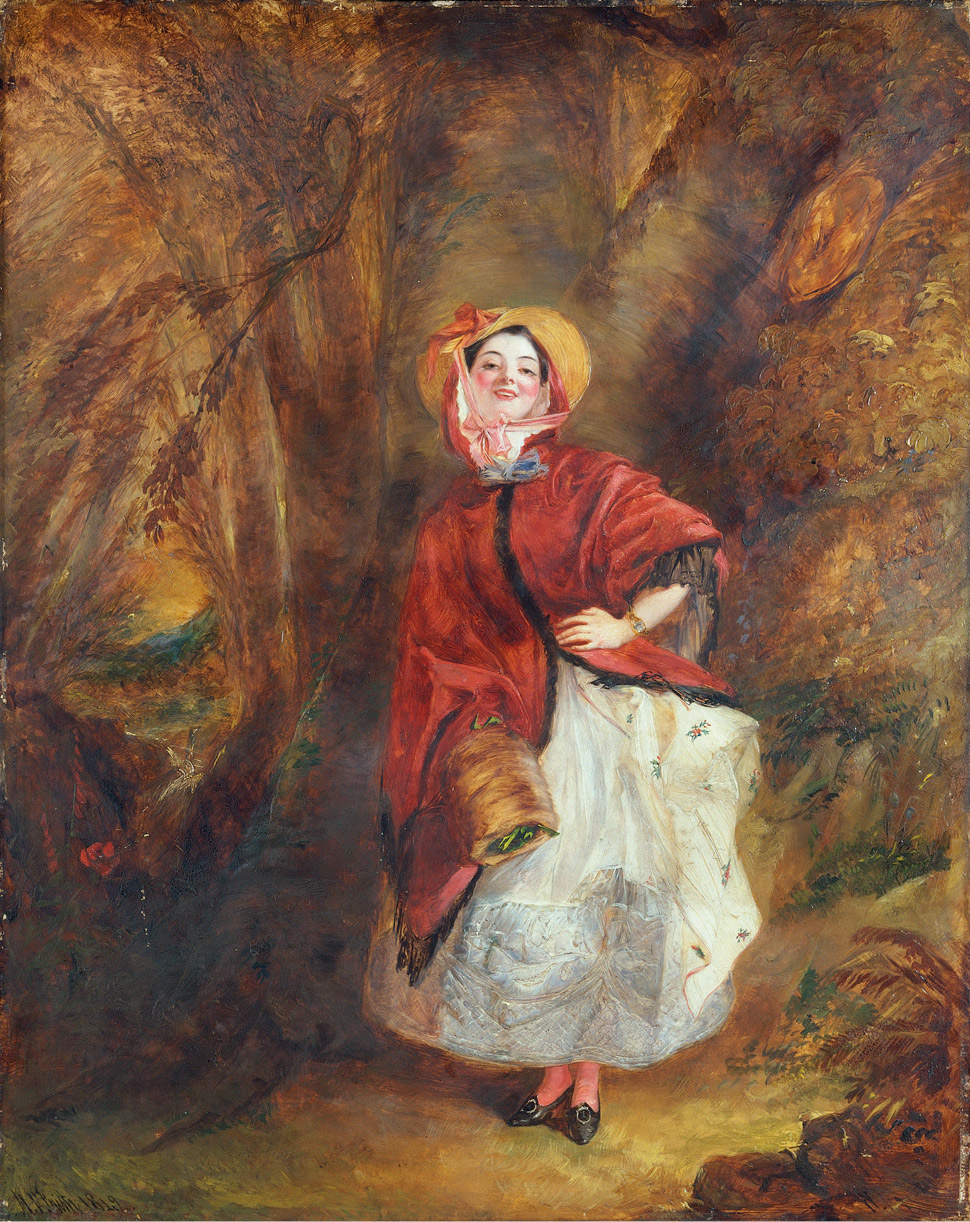
William Powell Frith's Dolly Varden (1842)

In 1841, the English writer Charles Dickens published the historical novel Barnaby Rudge. One character in particular made an impression on the public—a young woman named Dolly Varden, the daughter of a locksmith. Described in the narrative as coquettish, "dimpled and fresh and healthful – the very impersonation of good-humour and blooming beauty", Dickens went into detail about the appearance of her clothing:

Dolly, the very pink and pattern of good looks, in a smart little cherrycoloured mantle, with a hood of the same drawn over her head, and upon the top of that hood, a little straw hat trimmed with cherry-coloured ribbons, and worn the merest trifle on one side – just enough in short to make it the wickedest and most provoking head-dress that ever malicious milliner devised. And she wore such a cruel little muff, and such a heart-rending pair of shoes.

To the painter William Powell Frith, this image of Dolly was "delightful", and in 1842 he was inspired to produce a set of works depicting Dolly in a range of poses, which were met with the approval of Dickens. Several more paintings in more poses followed. After Dickens's death in 1869, dressing as Dolly Varden became a fad in London. Women wearing straw hats and large, multilayered dresses patterned with flowers appeared in magazines of the time, and various things were named for Dolly as tributes, including a straw hat, parasol, and a Dolly Varden song and a Dolly Varden dance were created. The fad quickly spread to the United States, where tributes continued, including a colourful fish and a train line.

== Cake history ==
=== Original ===
The Dolly Varden cake was one of these American tributes. Flavoured with fruits and spices, the cake was made colourful and multi-layered to reference the character's popular appearance. Light layer cakes were common in America, contrasting with the heavier, uniform cakes of the British cake-making traditions. The emphasis of contrast between layers also reflected a popular technique in America, with the same basic premise also seen in cakes such as Jenny Lind cake, Neapolitan cake, and Prince of Wales cake, among others.

One of the earliest recipes for Dolly Varden cake in print was published in 1877 in Melrose Household Treasure, a cookbook from Melrose, Massachusetts. This cake contained layers of white, yellow, rose, and chocolate, consisting of a basic white cake (white), a basic egg yolk cake (yellow), a cake of chocolate mixed into egg yolk batter (chocolate), and a cake of rosewater and cochineal-derived carmine mixed into white cake batter (rose). The recipe was immediately followed by a multi-coloured layer cake named "Dickens Cake". Another early recipe is given by Emma Whitcomb Babcock in 1881, who writes about a cake consisting of fruit cake and lemon cake layers, sandwiching a layer of jam. Other early versions followed suit, sometimes using butter cake instead of or in addition to lemon cake, and sometimes using icing or vanilla-flavoured buttercream instead of jam. Recipes appeared in Australia in the 1880s.

In the following years, recipes continued to be published in Australia and America. One of these American recipes was published in 1903 in Mrs Owen's Cook Book and Sensible Household Hints, using a square tin and cloves, cinnamon and nutmeg for spices. Recipes continued to vary in Australia until around the 1910s, when they settled down into a predictable preparation. The cake remained popular in Australia over the following decades as a novelty cake, including in the Depression when cookbooks advised cooks use tallow instead of butter, and reduce the fruits, spices, and other expensive ingredients. Other variations included the inclusion of ingredients such as coconut, cardamom, Maraschino cherries and nuts, and in the 1940s and 1950s, Dolly Varden cakes cooked in round, pudding tins. According to a cookbook published in America in the 1980s, the Dolly Varden cake remained common, even as Barnaby Rudge was largely forgotten.

=== Resembling a dress ===
By the 1950s in Australia, Dolly Varden cakes were being made to resemble a dress. A 1953 article in the Australian Woman's Mirror describes this as among the most popular novelty cakes of the time, especially at parties for young girls. The cake was made in a deep, cone-shaped tin, and when ready, was overturned. In the top, a doll figurine made of ceramic or plastic was inserted, and the cake decorated with icing in a range of patterns and shapes such as flowers when the cook's ability and tools allowed, or with a sash tied around the figure's waist with real or artificial flowers tucked in when they did not.

In the 1970s, the Dolly Varden Cake Tin entered the Australian market, in a move which may have been inspired by the popularity of Barbie. This tin was shaped as a deep cone, producing a cake in the shape of a skirt and bodice. Each tin was accompanied by detailed descriptions of how to make and decorate a Dolly Varden cake. At the top of the cake, the upper half of a plastic doll was set, or a whole doll if the hole was deep enough. Since its introduction to Australia, Dolly Varden cakes shaped as dresses have become dominant and preparations in line with the original style rare. The cake has become closely associated with the birthday parties of young girls, with the decoration being the most important element. It has taken on new names, including "Barbie Cake", "Dolly Cake" and "Princess Doll Cake", even as the tin has retained its name.

The Dolly Varden cake has continued to change in Australia. In the 1980s, the base was sometimes made of ice cream, and is now often made using cake mixes. Since the 1980s, recipes have appeared in cookbooks such as The Australian Women's Weekly Children's Birthday Cake Book, decorated with items such as marshmallows, and variations following the trends of Barbie, such as a cake dressed with a lei and grass skirt to match "Island Girl" Barbie. One subversion of the archetypal femininity seen in the modern Australian Dolly Varden was made by a group of Melbourne artists named the Hotham Street Ladies. Their version of the Dolly Varden cake was fashioned after the British singer Amy Winehouse, and was adorned with tattoos, a cigarette, and bottles of vodka. Dolly Varden cakes made to resemble a dress are today made in America. Like they are in Australia, these cakes are associated with the parties of young girls.

== See also ==
- Princess cake
- List of cakes

== Sources ==
- Babcock, Emma Whitcomb (1881). Household Hints. New York: D. Appleton.
- Carlton, Jan McBride (1985). The Old Fashioned Cookbook. New York: Weathervane Books. ISBN 0-517-27794-8.
- Cedro, Carmel (June 2012). "Dolly Varden: Sweet inspiration". Australasian Journal of Popular Culture. 2 (1). doi:10.1386/ajpc.2.1.37_1.
- Cedro, Carmel (2015). "Dolly Varden cake". In Goldstein, Darra (ed.). The Oxford Companion to Sugar and Sweets. Oxford: Oxford University Press. ISBN 978-0-199-31339-6.
- Gorman, Alyx (15 March 2020). "A daggy delight: 'Nothing touches the Children's Birthday Cake Book'". The Guardian. Archived from the original on 17 December 2025.
- Humble, Nicola (2010). Cake: A Global History. London: Reaktion Books. ISBN 978-1-86189-648-3.
- Melrose Household Treasure. Melrose, Massachusetts: Committee of the Congregational Society. 1877.
- Reber, Patricia Bixler (2015). "Layer cake". In Goldstein, Darra (ed.). The Oxford Companion to Sugar and Sweets. Oxford: Oxford University Press. ISBN 978-0-199-31339-6.
- Reber, Patricia Bixler (6 May 2019). "Dolly Varden Cake - Doll Cake". Researching Food History. Archived from the original on 9 May 2019.
- R J (15 April 1953). "Kitchencraft: Cake Decoration the Professional Way". Australian Woman's Mirror. Vol. 29, no. 21.
- Schmidt, Stephen (2013). "Cake". In Smith, Andrew F. (ed.). The Oxford Encyclopedia of Food and Drink in America. Vol. 1 (2nd ed.). New York: Oxford University Press. ISBN 978-0-19-973496-2.
