= Henry Hargreaves =

Henry Hargreaves may refer to:

- Henry Hargreaves (footballer) (1893–1916), English footballer
- Henry Hargreaves (photographer) (born 1979), Brooklyn-based artist and food photographer
- H. A. Hargreaves (Henry A. Hargreaves, 1928–2017), professor and science fiction writer

== See also ==
- Harry Hargreaves (disambiguation)
