= Henry Hargreaves (photographer) =

American model and photographer

- Born: 1979 (age 46–47); New Zealand
- Education: Canterbury University
- Occupations: Photographer, artist
- Website: henryhargreaves.com

Henry Hargreaves (born 1979) is a Brooklyn-based artist and food photographer. and is regarded as one of the best commercial and conceptual still life photographers of his generation.

== Early life and education ==
Henry Hargreaves grew up in New Zealand. In high school, Christ's College in Christchurch, New Zealand, he took photography and then attended Canterbury University, earning a degree in American studies and film studies.

== Career ==
=== Restaurants ===
Hargreaves honed his bartending skills at the original Lone Star branch on Manchester Street in Christchurch, and then a bartender at Schiller's on the lower east side of Manhattan for three years after moving to New York. Since then has become a partner in Jack's Wife Freda in Soho, Saint Mazie in Williamsburg, Brooklyn.

=== Model ===
While traveling, Henry was approached and recruited by a modeling agent. He modeled for Prada, YSL, Hermes, Lacoste, and Jil Sander. He modeled full-time for three years and was labeled one of the biggest models of 2002 and 2003.

=== Photographer ===
With an approach focusing on storytelling and engaging visuals, New York-based Henry Hargreaves is regarded as one of the best commercial and conceptual still life photographers of his generation. Hargreaves learned photography techniques from speaking with photographers and experimented with his own set. He works out of a studio in Williamsburg, Brooklyn and shoots for clients such as Ralph Lauren, NY Magazine, GQ, National Geographic, Boucheron, The New York Times, and Sagmeister. He has photographed several cookbooks for Christina Tosi, Banny Bowien and the Jack's Wife Freda cookbook. Hargreaves uses food as a medium in his photo series, including: Burning Calories, Food of the Rainbow, Mark Rice-Ko, Jello-O presidents, Edible Subway, Bacon Alphabet, and No Seconds. Other still life photo series include Zen of Yoda, Deep-Fried Gadgets, and Game Over. In 2018 he used as inspiration the cakes familiar to him from his childhood made from the Australian Women's Weekly Children's Birthday Cake Book for the exhibition 'Birthday's that will never come' in Wellington.

He delivered a talk titled "We Are What We Eat" at the food-centric TEDxManhattan event, exploring how food can help us understand and empathize with others.

=== Ai Artist ===
Since 2024 Henry has been producing Generative assisted Art. His projects can be seen at Nothing Boring. In 2025 The Museum of Cleveland launched their Exhibition "Renaissance to Runway." Henry Collaborated with fellow filmmaker Francesco Carrozzini to produce the feature movie for the exhibition.

=== Exhibitions ===
Hargreaves featured his photography internationally in exhibitions at the MAXXI in Rome The Venice Biennale, Herter Gallery at the University of Massachusetts, Amherst, The Lunch Box Gallery in Miami, Precinct 35 in New Zealand. Photaumnales 2024 Festival in France, Holon Design Museum, Israel, KWADRAT Gallery, Berlin.

=== Coffee Cups of the World ===
Hargreaves also has a large collection of coffee cups and curates the Instagram feed @coffeecupsoftheworld. His collection has been exhibited at EEEEEATSCON in LA with The Infatuation and in New York at ORA Gallery.

== Awards and recognition ==
- In 2012, Hargreaves worked on two Type Directors Club-winning projects. Projects Hargreaves worked on won the award for advertising campaign and for poster.
- Hargreaves won the grand prize for the Budweiser Made in America R/W/B competition, curated by rapper Jay-Z's Life+Times website in 2012.
- In 2012, Henry Hargreaves' Food of the Rainbow was ranked number six in the Top Ten Most Viral Web Content on Trendland.
- 2023, Burger Power Rankings condiment art for the LA Times won Silver at the 44th Annual Society for News Design Awards LA Times
- 2026, Three Last Meals, for the Oklahoma City Curbside Chronicle, 1st place in the Society for Features Journalism’s 2026 Excellence-in-Features Awards

== See also ==
- Photography
- Type Directors Club
