= Harry Hargreaves =

Harry Hargreaves may refer to:

- Harry Hargreaves (cartoonist)
- Harry Hargreaves (footballer)

== See also ==
- Henry Hargreaves (disambiguation)
