= Dag (slang) =

Australian and New Zealand slang term

Dag is an Australian and New Zealand slang term, also daggy (adjective). In Australia, it is often used as an affectionate insult for someone who is, or is perceived to be, unfashionable, lacking self-consciousness about their appearance and/or with poor social skills yet affable and amusing. It is also used to describe an amusing, quirky and likeable person who doesn't take themselves too seriously (as in, "He's a bit of a dag") and is non-pejorative. The term was more widely used in the 1970s due to the popular New Zealand comedy of Fred Dagg (John Clarke). The term may be simply affectionate, such as when it was used to describe the recipes in the enduringly popular The Australian Women's Weekly Children's Birthday Cake Book.

Differentiated from bogans, whose accents are presumed to indicate working class or uneducated origins, dag refers to being unfashionable, eccentric and fool-like and hence has no necessary ties with social class or educational background.

The literal meaning is a dung-caked lock of wool around the hindquarters of a sheep – an abbreviation of "daglock".

== History ==
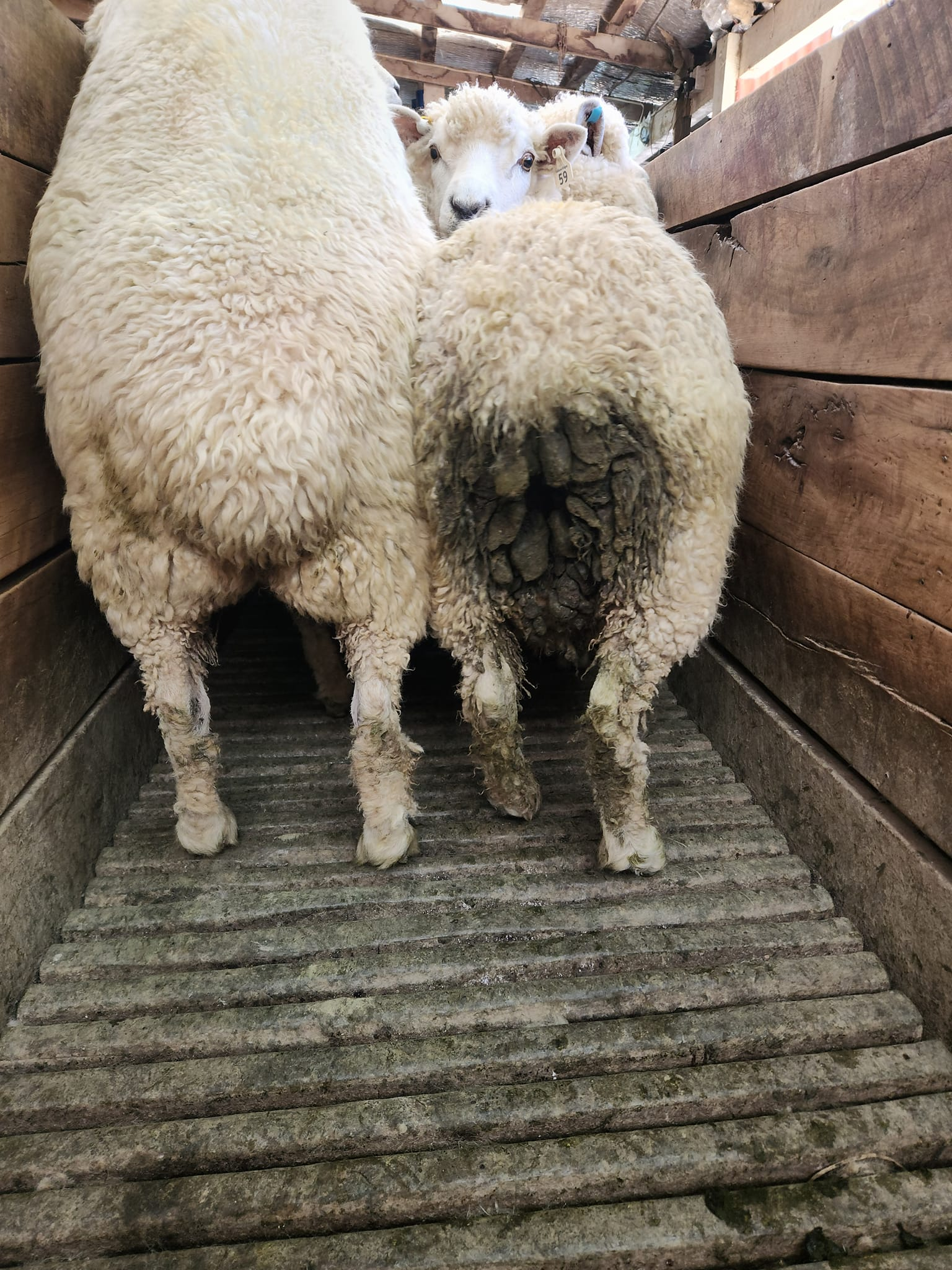
The sheep on the right has a severe dag covering their rear area

Originally a word meaning the dried faeces left dangling from the wool on a sheep's rear end, the word dag is more commonly used in colloquial Australian English to refer to someone's unfashionable, often eccentric or idiosyncratic style or demeanor together with poor social skills and amusing manner.

This colloquial use of the term "dag" was first recorded in the Anzac Songbook in 1916, but has been popular since the 1970s. It has also been used interchangeably with the term "wag" as in "what a wag", which refers to the amusing aspect inherent in 'dag' but without referring to fashion or style.

This use of "dag" comes closest in meaning to the UK slang term "pillock" (meaning fool). However, "dag" is differentiated from terms like dork, nerd or geek by virtue of having no particular association with a drive for intellectual pursuits or interest in technology and no particular tendency towards being a loner. It is also used differently in that it can be an affectionate term as much as, or even more than, an insult. However, one can simultaneously fit the archetype for a dag and a geek, dork or nerd.

Whilst "bogan" refers to being unfashionable in the slovenly sense, it is distinguished from "dag" in that the term "bogan" has no necessary links with being eccentric, idiosyncratic or amusing. Similarly, the more antisocial behaviours associated with bogans are usually not found amusing and are more associated with terms like yobbo.

== Dag style ==
Dag style is not by necessity slovenly. A dag may, for example, choose to wear textures that feel nice regardless of how they look or wear something they have become attached to even if it's old and worn out. The emphasis, however, is on being unconventional rather than the slovenly archetype associated with the term "bogan".

Dags are considered amusing just by being themselves and attract feelings of either embarrassment or endearment from others.

Dag music tends to be that which one's age peers wouldn't accept or would find out of date. Similarly, dags may wear hair and clothing styles they enjoy even where these are considered unfashionable or ridiculous.

The tendency of dags to stick with what they like regardless of the opinions or pressures from others wins respect from some but pity, scorn or bullying from others for the same reasons.

The term "dag" can be a compliment from one dag to another.

Dags are seen as enjoying activities regardless of their appearances to others. An example may be that teenage and adult dags may skip down the street or sing in the street just because it's fun regardless of the social consequences.

== In popular culture ==
An eccentric character portrayed by Abbey Lee Kershaw in the Australian science-fiction film Mad Max: Fury Road is named The Dag.

Other media personalities have fitted the dag archetype by nature more than role. Environmentalist and TV personality Steve Irwin and comedian Spike Milligan, when he was resident in Australia, have all displayed the idiosyncrasies commonly associated with affable dags.

The embarrassing nature of dag demeanor makes them disliked by some and loved by others for the same reasons. When Steve Irwin died, some Australians spoke of him as an embarrassing reflection on Australian culture whilst other Australians stood up for him as a lovable dag and particularly his overseas audience, celebrated his naturalness and affable nature.

The cultural confusion between the dag and bogan archetypes in the media is exemplified by the 1998 film, Dags, which whilst incorporating a few features of archetypal dag clothing style for the men such as long socks, Hawaiian shirts and sandals, has the women in tank tops and hot pants quite unassociated with the dag archetype, and throughout the film portrays typical bogan archetypes of slovenliness, substance abuse, and indiscriminate sex.
