= Dolly Varden, Ohio =

Unincorporated community in Ohio, U.S.

Coordinates: 39°50′33″N 83°41′33″W

Dolly Varden is an unincorporated community in Clark County, in the U.S. state of Ohio.

== History ==
Dolly Varden was platted in 1872, and most likely was named after Dolly Varden, a character in the novel Barnaby Rudge by Charles Dickens.
