= Pamela Clark =

Australian chef

- Born: 1944 (age 81–82)
- Occupations: Chef, cookbook author
- Known for: The Australian Women's Weekly

Pamela Clark (born 1944) is an Australian chef, cookbook author and food presenter, and has been associated with The Australian Women's Weekly for 50 years.

== Early life ==
Clark spent her preschool years living on Aneityum, Vanuatu, due to her father's work there. In 1948, the family left Aneityum and returned to Australia, and from 1949, she attended Meriden School in Strathfield, Sydney. Her favourite school subject was Home Science with teacher Miss Scott, who was a former cookery demonstrator at the Australian Gas Light Company (AGL). Aged 11, Clark decided that she, too, wanted to work in the food industry. At 15, she completed a cake-decorating course at a local technical college. She left school aged 17 in the early 1960s, and followed in Miss Scott's footsteps by working as a cooking demonstrator for four months at AGL, and then worked at the St George County Council for seven years. From her work through the Council at the Sydney Royal Easter Show, she met staff from the Australian Women's Weekly (AWW) Test Kitchen (then known as the Leila Howard Test Kitchen). She then applied for a role at the Test Kitchen with food editor Ellen Sinclair.

== Career ==
In September 1969, she began as the Chief Home Economist in the Leila Howard Test Kitchen (Australian Women's Weekly (AWW) Test Kitchen). She helped produce nine cookbooks over four years, and organised the magazine's food testing and photography. She worked on the original Australian Women's Weekly Cookbook published in 1970, one of her contributions was having prepared the Savoury lamb casserole featured on the front of the book jacket.

Clark moved to Tasmania in 1973 and worked as a food presenter on television and radio, as well as teaching Adult Education food classes, and running a hotel restaurant in Hobart.

External videos
- 2018 interview with Pamela Clark
- Pamela Clark demonstrates how to make "The train cake"

She returned as the Weekly's Chief Home Economist in 1978, and facilitated The Golden Cooking Library, Cookery Cards, AWW Home Library Cookbooks and the magazine's recipes. She was the catalyst of The Children's Birthday Cake Book, having spoken about animal cakes after making a dinosaur cake for a young neighbour. In a later cake title, Clark said that this book was the favourite part of her job: "I love baking, and I'm just crazy about every aspect of creating children's cakes..." Clark became the Food Editor in 1984. One of the changes she introduced was a greater emphasis on photographing the recipes. Her role as Food Editor included tasting and approving 2000 recipes in a year, which would then be included across 12 months' of the magazine, the Weekly's Menu Planner series, and the six cookbooks published annually.

In his role as Clark's boss, media owner Kerry Packer would often request pink-iced finger buns and three-minute eggs to be delivered in short time frames. Clark also ran his dining room in the same building as the Test Kitchen. In a satirical article from 1991, Packer was alleged to have concocted wholemeal lamingtons using Vogel's branded bread in the Test Kitchen, "...before food editor Pamela Clark had had a chance to intervene...". The humorous take concluded that the Fairfax Committee delighted in the lamingtons, with the recipe destined for an issue of the Weekly, but this enjoyment did not extend to Packer's media ownership.

In the 1990s, Clark made bi-monthly television presentations and appearances on Channel Nine's 'What's Cooking', and in 2003, the channel's 'Fresh Cooking with the AWW'. From 2006 to 2011, Clark contributed recipes to the ABC Radio website.

In 2016, Clark described her cooking philosophy as: "Cooking for me is all about simplicity - letting the beautiful fresh produce and flavours shine."

Clark was credited as Food Editor since her 1984 appointment, through to the 1990s, and then variously as Food Director (2002 - 2012), later as Editorial and Food Director from 2012 to approximately 2015. A contributing factor for her role title changes was the sale of Australian Consolidated Press to Bauer Media Group in 2012. She became the Editorial Director of Bauer Books after the incumbent retired. She has also been considered to be the AWW Test Kitchen Director. From 2018, her role is as the Editorial Director at Large of Bauer Books.

She has been credited as one of Australia's most renowned cooks.

=== Charity work ===
Clark was featured in the Celebrity Cooks Collection, a cookbook released by the National Heart Foundation in 1995, featuring 18 well-known Australian food writers. Contributors were asked for recipes of their favourite international cuisine, within the dietary guidelines of the Heart Foundation. She contributed a chapter on cuisine from Vietnam.

Clark was an Ambassador for the Australian Red Cross for their Red Cross Big Cake Bake fundraising event, circa 2014 - 2017.

In 2016, she judged a charity bake-off featuring all the cakes from The Children's Birthday Cake Book. The cake challenge benefited the Canberra-based then-named PANDSI (Post and Ante Natal Depression Support and Information Inc.), renamed to Perinatal Wellbeing Centre in 2019/2020. Clark planned to be a future patron of the charity.

== Bibliography ==
=== Interviews ===
Clark was interviewed on Radio National in July 2016 about "cake pushers" in the workplace. In November 2018, she was featured on ABC Radio's Life Matters and Nightlife with Melanie Tait. In 2018, she was featured on the ABC's Throwback series, with the interview focused on The Children's Birthday Cake Book.

=== Books ===
Clark has contributed to around 400 to 500 of "the Weekly" recipe books including the popular Home Library series. Many of the AWW books do not include an author, but are informally attributed to Clark, due to her role as the Test Kitchen Director or Editor. She commented on the history of the AWW publications, noting the 40 year gap between the publication of the initial Best ever recipes (circa 1976) and 2016's Best ever recipes (ISBN 9781742457185), the latter for which she was Editorial and Food Director. She considered the first 'Best Ever' book as having "...led the field in showcasing The Australian Women's Weekly's triple-tested recipes in a cookbook." The 'Best Ever' title sold two million copies and became an Australian household staple.

In 2004, Clark wrote The magazine editors' diet: a revolutionary low-carb, low-fat diet with Catherine Saxelby.

In 2009, the Weekly highlighted Clark's then-30 years of expertise, publishing the celebratory book, Ask Pamela Q&A: Pamela Clark answers all your cooking questions (ACP Books, Sydney, 2009, ISBN 9781863968713). It was published to feature the most common questions posed to Clark in her roles in the Test Kitchen. It was reviewed by Annelise Balsamo as perhaps being more suited to cooks who do not use the internet for troubleshooting questions. She noted that the information was accessible and useful, including having the authority of Clark as the Women's Weekly food director and the Weekly's gravitas. Clark's answers have also been reviewed as easily understandable, unfailingly practical and down to earth. That same year, a separate title was published in the same ilk but with a focus on baking, Q & A bake: Pamela Clark answers all your baking questions (ACP Books, Sydney, 2009, ISBN 9781863969772). It was reviewed by Christine Antoniou as a quick reference book with handy tips.

In October 2018, Bauer Media Group published the title Pamela Clark: memories & recipes from the test kitchen (alternative title, Pamela Clark: recipes & stories from the test kitchen) (Bauer Media Group, Sydney, ISBN 9781742458649).

== Personal life ==
Clark has two sisters, one was a nurse the other a high school teacher. Clark lived with her son, Robby, in Newtown, Sydney during the 1990s. Clark has two grandchildren, Elspeth Watson Clark and Isobel Watson Clark, who also partake in the tradition of choosing birthday cakes from The Children's Birthday Cake Book.
