= Dolly Varden (yacht) =

British racing yacht

Dolly Varden was a British racing yacht.

== History ==
The boat was built in 1872 at Whites Shipyard at Cowes on the Isle of Wight as an Itchen ferry design, and used initially as a fishing vessel in the Solent. She was later converted to a racing yacht by Richard Grant, the then secretary of the Royal Yacht Squadron, who won many races with the boat.

In 1888 Dolly Varden was sold to Thomas Ratsey, the co-founder of Ratsey and Lapthorne, a very famous sail making company based in Cowes on the Isle of Wight. Thomas modified the hull in order to increase sail capacity and enable her to tack better. Following these modifications, the boat won almost every race in which it was entered. Ratsey also used Dolly Varden as a test rig to try out several new sail designs, including those for the America's Cup.

King George V and Uffa Fox, who subsequently sailed with Prince Philip and taught Prince Charles to sail, were both guests aboard Dolly Varden. Fox referred to the boat as the "Queen of the Solent" and "probably the fastest boat of her length in the world" in spite of the fact that she was then 65 years old. Ratsey lived aboard Dolly Varden in the summer of 1934 where King George V and Queen Mary visited him. Ratsey died a year later in 1935. His son Chris continued to race Dolly Varden up to the start of the Second World War when it was sold to Claire Lallow's Boatyard on the Isle of Wight. When the boatyard was destroyed by bombing, Dolly Varden was drafted into service as the family home until the end of the war. After the war Dolly Varden disappeared, and there appears to be no record of the boat until 1965, when it was bought by a Dennis Riley from Southampton. Following extensive renovation, Dolly Varden was moored on the River Hamble where volunteers from a local youth club became her regular crew.

Although Dolly Varden's full history was not known to this group, they were aware that it was nearing its 100th birthday, so in August 1970 they took Dolly Varden on a "centenary" voyage to Paris, from the River Hamble to Le Havre, and then up the Seine into the centre of Paris where the boat was moored for a week before returning home.

Dolly Varden was sold as a houseboat to John Perkins in 1978. After a few years, Perkins took it out of the water for restoration in a smallholding. The work wasn't completed, the boat was left in a field, covered by a tarpaulin for the next 25 years. In 2016 the smallholding was sold, and the landowner considered setting fire to the hull. Instead, it was taken to the International Boatbuilding Training College at Portsmouth for restoration.

Some of the boat's hull on one side was missing and damaged, but according to a surveyor, the hull was mainly sound and repairable. Following a change of management at IBTC the restoration Dolly Varden was moved to Weymouth.

== Current work ==
Dolly Varden has been registered with National Historic Ships as an historic vessel of national importance. Its original racing pennant is housed in the Cowes Maritime Museum. The boat is believed to have been named for "Dolly Varden", a character in Charles Dickens' 1880 novel Barnaby Rudge.

Dolly Varden's original tiller arm is hanging in Ratsey and Lapthorne's offices. It is estimated that the cost of restoring Dolly Varden will be in the order of £300,000 and a fundraising exercise is under way to get the boat sailing again.
