= Bergère hat =

Flat-brimmed straw hat with a shallow crown

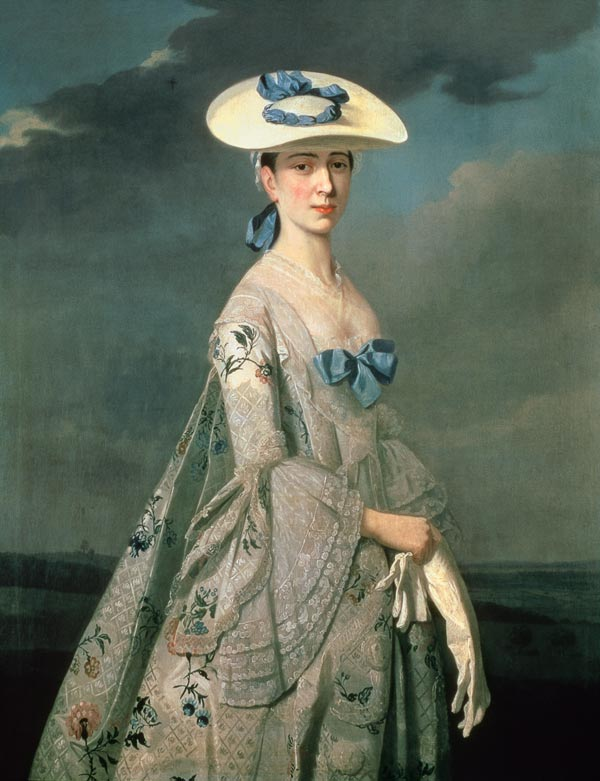
Eleanor Frances Dixie, the daughter of Wolstan Dixie c. 1753, by Henry Pickering. The sitter is wearing a bergère hat.

A bergère (French for shepherdess) hat is a flat-brimmed straw hat with a shallow crown, usually trimmed with ribbon and flowers. It could be worn in various ways with the brim folded back or turned up or down at whim. It is also sometimes called a milkmaid hat. It was widely worn in the mid-18th century, and versions may be seen in many British and French paintings of the period, such as The Swing by Fragonard, and in portraits by Thomas Gainsborough and Johann Zoffany, amongst others. It has been suggested that the hat was named after Madame Bergeret, who is holding a shepherdess-style hat in a Boucher portrait painted c.1766.

A nineteenth century version of the bergère hat formed part of the Dolly Varden ensembles popular in the early 1870s, as summed up in Alfred Lee's novelty song Dolly Varden (published Cleveland, 1872) which contains the lyrics: "Have you seen my little girl? She doesn't wear a bonnet/ She's got a monstrous flip-flop hat with cherry ribbons on it."

Madame Bergeret holding a bergère hat, c.1766. Painted by François Boucher

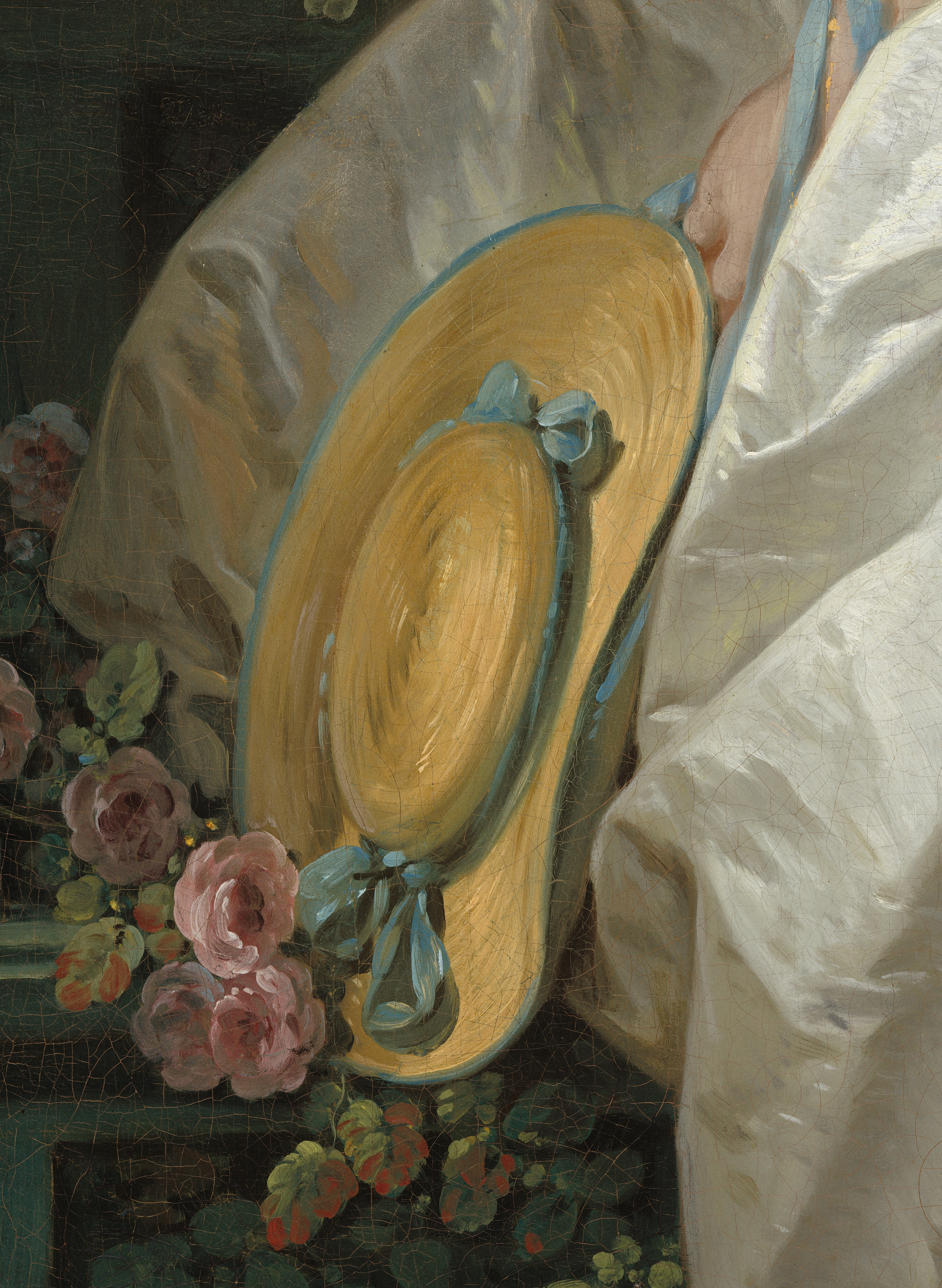
Detail of the bergère hat from Boucher's portrait of Madame Bergeret

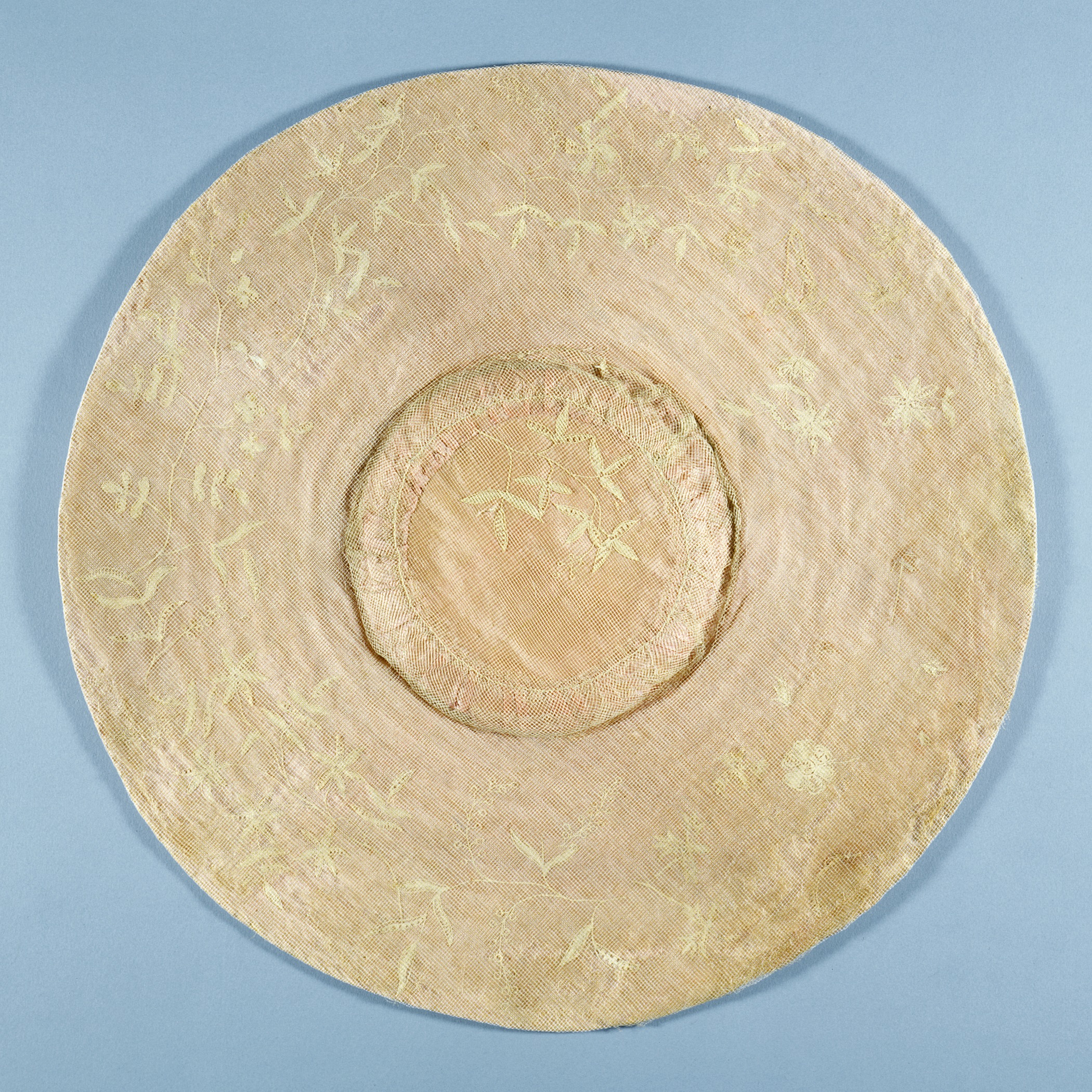
Bergère hat, embroidered tulle over silk and straw. Aerial view of outside. 1750s.

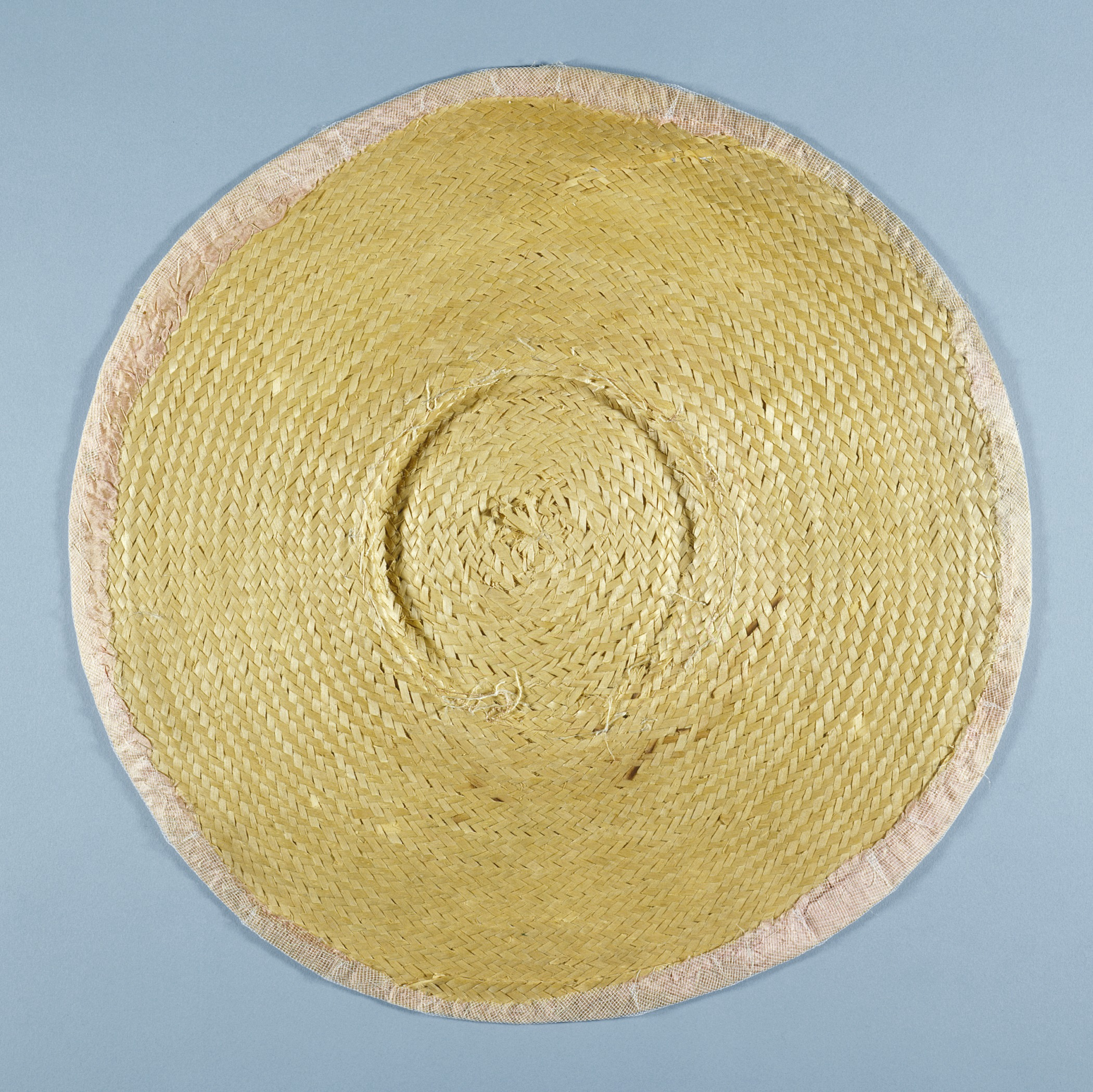
Bergère hat, embroidered tulle over silk and straw. Aerial view of underside. 1750s.

== See also ==
- List of hat styles
- Pamela hat
