= Pamela hat =

Straw hat

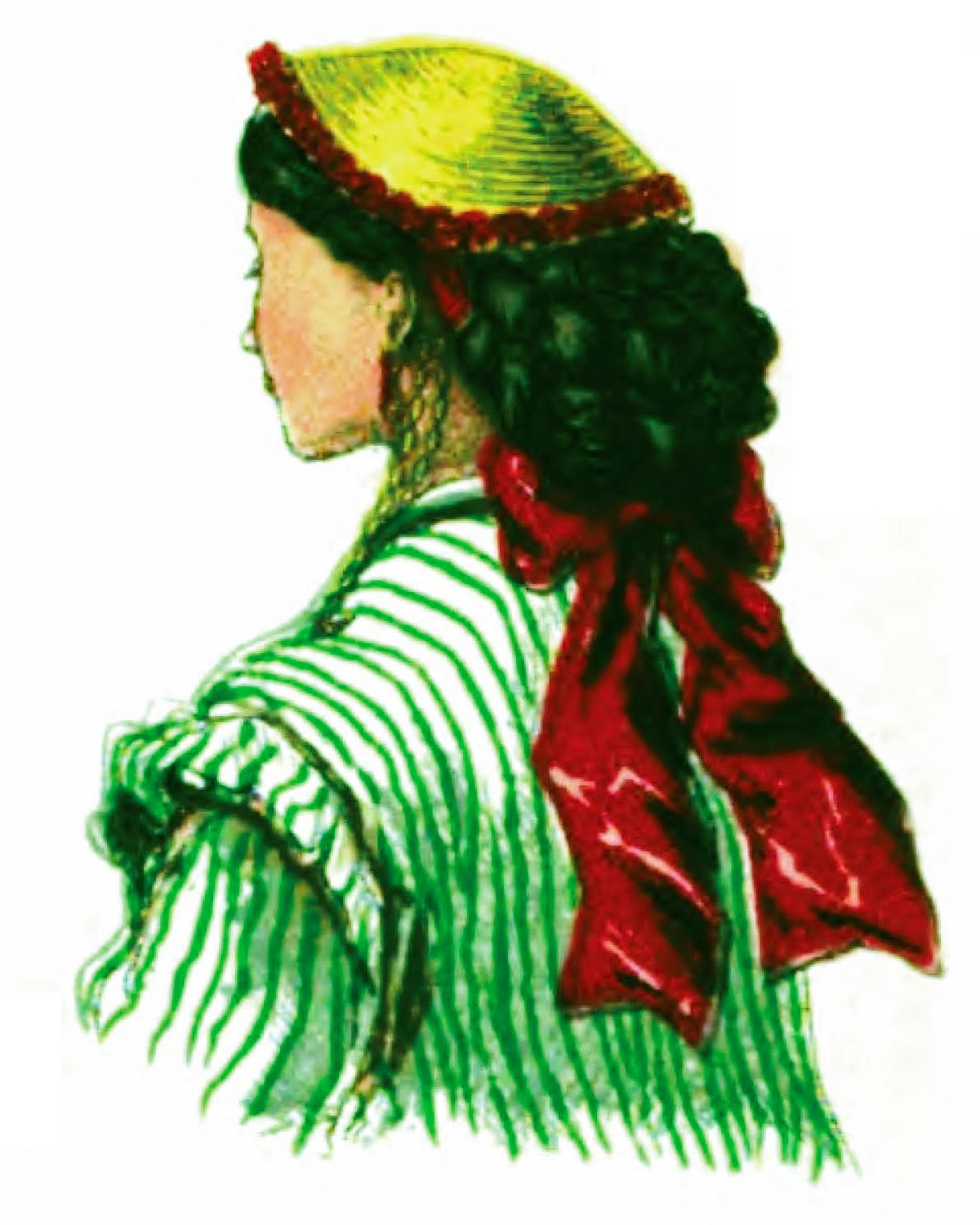
Pamela fancy straw hat, 1866

The Chapeau à la Paméla, Pamela hat or Pamela bonnet described a type of straw hat or bonnet popular during the 1790s and into the first three quarters of the 19th century. It was named after the heroine of Samuel Richardson's 1741 novel Pamela; or, Virtue Rewarded. While Pamela hats and bonnets underwent a variety of changes in shape and form, they were always made from straw. The mid-19th-century version of the Pamela hat was a smaller version of an early 19th-century wide-brimmed style called the gipsy hat.

== 18th-century origins ==
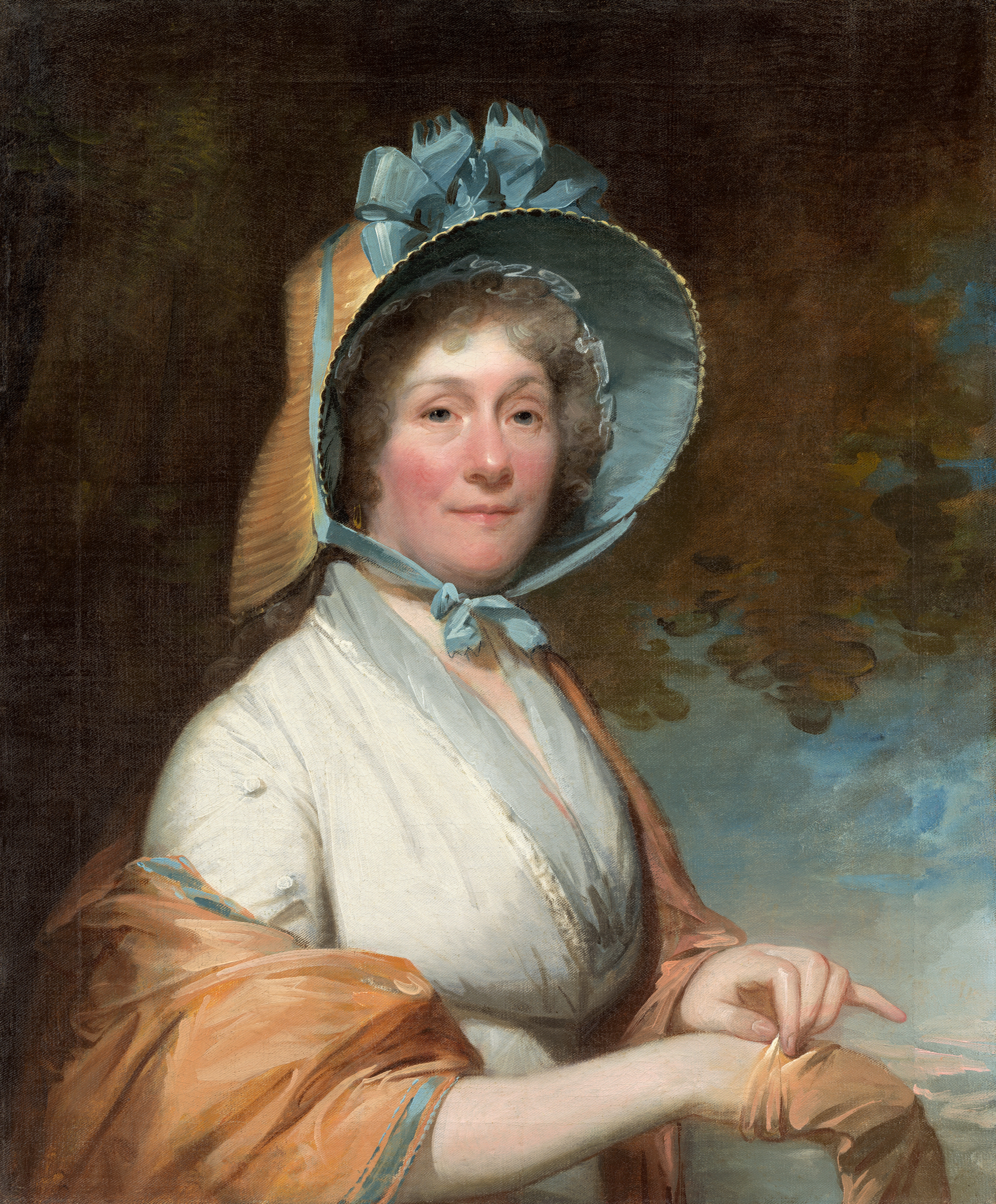
Henrietta Marchant Liston. A straw hat closely resembling the chapeau à-la-Pamela as depicted in fashion plates. By Gilbert Stuart, 1800.

In 1793, the French actress Mademoiselle Lange, appeared in a stage adaptation of Pamela; or, Virtue Rewarded, written by François de Neufchâteau. For the role Lange wore a straw hat which became known as a chapeau à-la-Pamela, and she is credited with popularising the style. Straw hats à-la-Pamela were popular for informal wear and widely worn well into the 1810s. In August 1815, La Belle Assemblée reported on the continued popularity of the chapeau à-la-Pamela, worn far back on the head with a tulle and lace cap underneath.

== Mid-19th century ==
The Pamela hat, which first emerged around 1837, was a version of the gipsy hat with a smaller brim. Gipsy hats were wide-brimmed straw hats worn in the first four decades of the nineteenth century, always with ribbons attached to the crown and coming over the brim to tie under the chin. A variation on the gipsy, where the wide brim was bent downwards by the ribbon ties, was called a witch's hat.

In 1837, Pamela hats and gipsy hats were listed separately as fashionable headgear for that year. By 1842 the Pamela hat was described as a "half-gipsy hat" being made of coarse straw with ribbon trimming, while the Pamela bonnet sloped backwards to reveal the wearer's ringlets. The Pamela bonnet, which was narrow-brimmed with a flat back and trimmed with ribbons and flowers, was fashionable in the 1840s and 1850s. By 1847 Cunnington noted that the Pamela shape was falling out of favour.

In May 1856 Godey's Lady's Book described the Pamela hat as a wide-brimmed, flat hat of straw tied under the chin and trimmed with flowers. It was described as a suitable hat for little girls. In March that same year, Godey described the Pamela bonnet as the latest Paris fashion, made popular by a milliner called Alexanche, and published a fashion plate showing how the brim rounded off at the ear like a gipsy hat. By 1858, Godey's were advising readers that the Pamela hat was appropriate only for children, or for wearing on holiday as resort wear. At this time, Godey informed its readers that an alternative name for the "Pamela flat" was "Equestrienne".

The Pamela bonnet was a fashionable option once again in 1865. In 1872, Gipsy and Pamela hats were both listed as options, both much reduced in size, while larger gipsy hats were known as Dolly Varden hats.

== Gallery ==
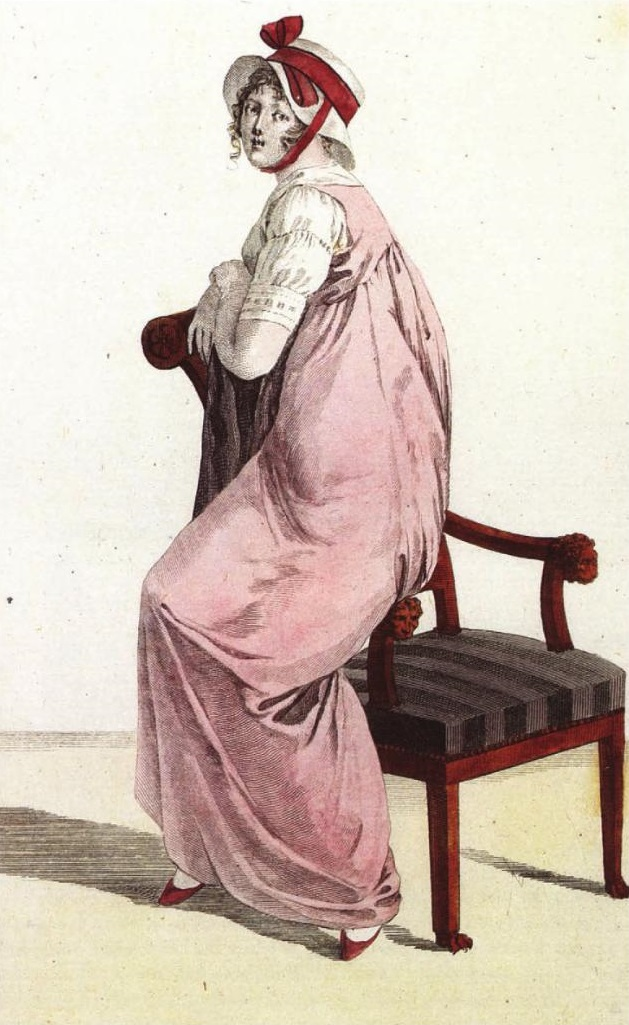
1. Chapeau à la Paméla, 1801-02

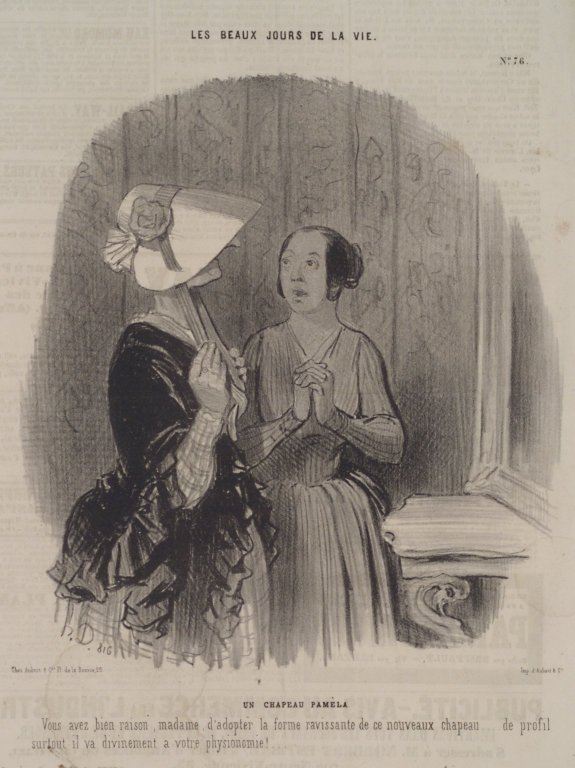
2. Un Chapeau Pamèla, c.1845
1. Chapeau à la Paméla, fashion plate published in Costume Parisien, 1801-2
2. Un Chapeau Pamèla, caricature by Honoré Daumier of a woman trying on a Pamela bonnet, c.1845

== See also ==
- Bergère hat
- List of hat styles
