= The Australian Women's Weekly Children's Birthday Cake Book =

Australian recipe book from 1980

- Cover of the 1980 edition
- Author: Ellen Sinclair and Pamela Clark
- Language: English
- Series: The Australian Women's Weekly cookbooks
- Subject: Birthday cakes
- Published: 1980 first edition, ACP; 2011 "Vintage edition", ACP
- Publication place: Australia
- Pages: 128
- ISBN: 0949892742

The Australian Women's Weekly Children's Birthday Cake Book (or simply AWWCBCB) is a popular recipe book focused on children's-themed birthday cakes published as part of The Australian Women's Weekly magazine cookbook series by Australian Consolidated Press, originally co-authored by the magazine's food editor, Ellen Sinclair, and chef Pamela Clark. First published in 1980 and re-released in 2011, its cultural impact has been variously described as an "Australian cult classic", a "cultural icon" and "national treasure". Between its launch in 1980 and its relaunch in 2011, notwithstanding it having been out of print for a significant portion of the intervening period, the recipe book sold more than a million copies, earning its description as a "publishing phenomenon".

During the 1970s and 80s, The Australian Women's Weekly was among the highest-selling magazines in Australia and published a wide range of titles for cake decorating, recipe and meal ideas in both book and magazine form.

== Themes and designs ==
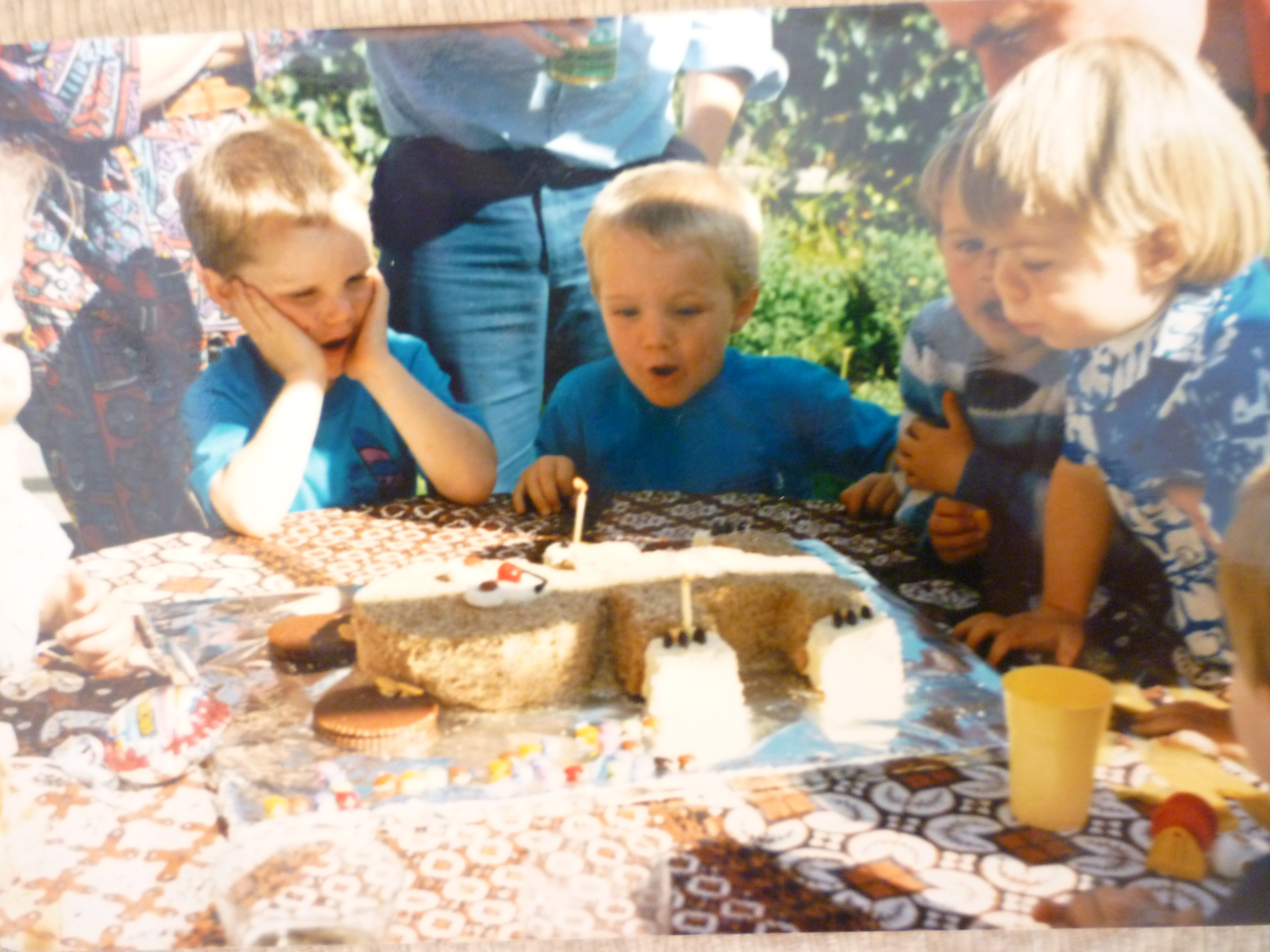
Child blowing out candle on the brown bear cake (1986)

There are 108 themed cakes appearing in the original edition, "largely composed of packet butter cake mix, Vienna cream icing and lollies". Although "for the over-achiever", the book offers a recipe for fresh butter cake at the front.

The cover illustration is of the "train cake", for which it became synonymous — the cookbook is sometimes referred to as "the book with the train on the cover". The swimming pool cake — a construction filled with jelly and tiny swimming figures — has been referred to as "the crowning glory", because, to a parent, it seemed so difficult to engineer. Some of the better-known cakes are:

- Choo-choo train (cover image), originally designed and created by Agnes Lee
- Swimming pool, featuring green jelly, typically Aeroplane Jelly Originally designed and created by Susan Christmas
- Jack in the box
- Piano
- Castle, featuring meringue
- Clock
- Racetrack, figure-8 shape
- Robot
- Lion
- Good witch
- Farmyard
- Miss Muffet
- Cricket bat
- Cricket field
- Dolly Varden
- Miss Piggy
- Humpty dumpty
- Duck, featuring chips
- Pirate
- Rubber ducky Originally designed and created by Agnes Lee featuring popcorn
- Shark
- Old Woman Who Lived in a Shoe
- Echidna
- Koala
- Giraffe
- Ghost
- Gingerbread house
- Hopscotch
- Pink elephant
- Typewriter
- Butterfly

== Publication history ==
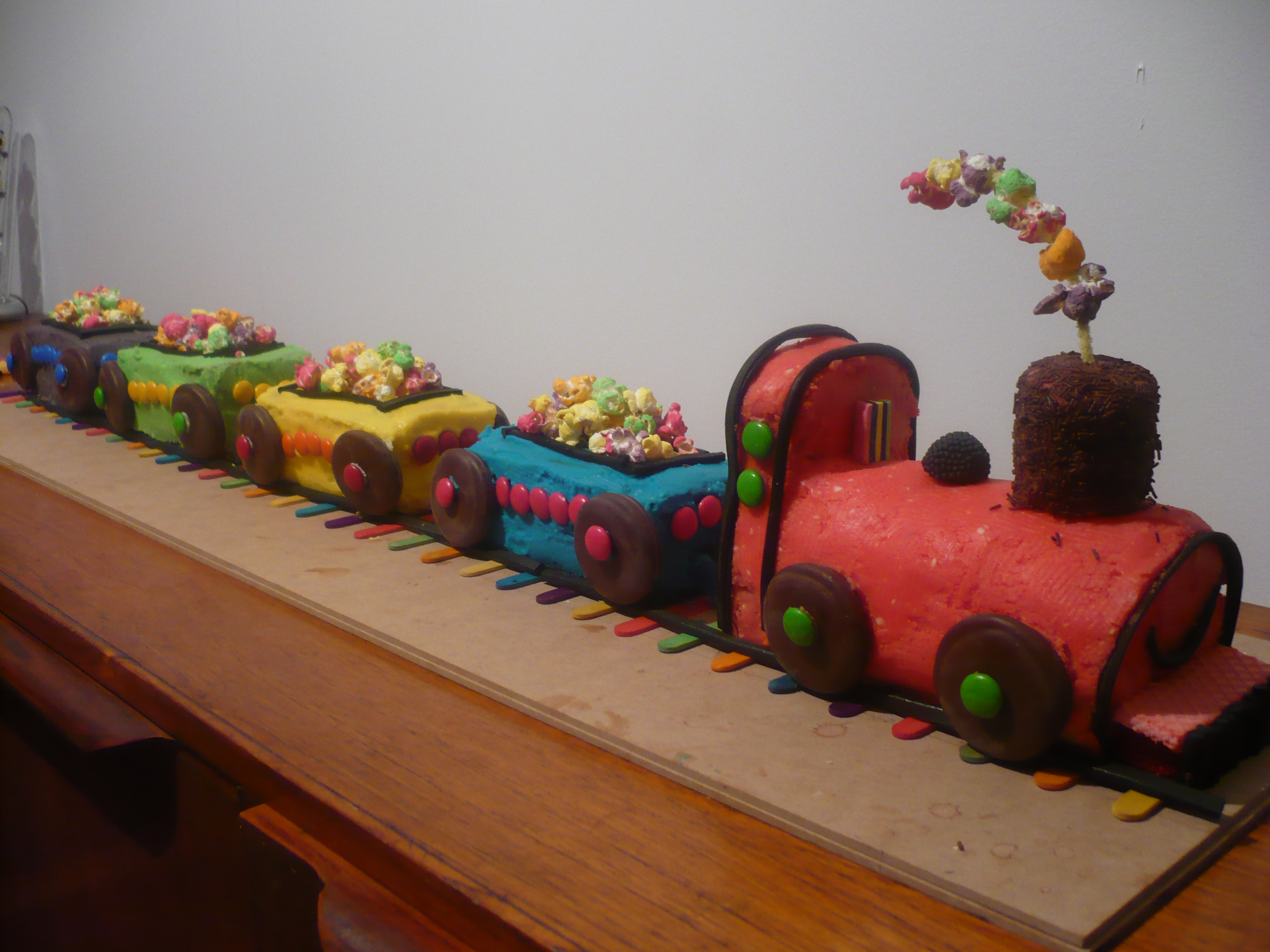
Recreation of the "train cake"

Some of the cakes featured in a Children's Party Foods–themed lift-out in September 1974. This included a Cowboys and Indians cake which looked very similar to the later Farmyard, and the Hickory Dickory Clock, later named Clock.

Clark was inspired to create the cookbook after creating a tyrannosaurus-shaped cake for a neighbour in 1978; however, despite this inspiration, no dinosaur-themed cakes were included in the eventual publication. The first edition was printed in 1980, and a "vintage" edition of the book was published in 2011, being reprinted four times in the first six months with initial sales of 100,000 copies. As of 2015, the 2011 edition is in the circulating collection of over 40 public libraries across the country, while the original edition (in various reprints) remains in circulation in 27. Four of the original recipes featuring cartoon characters were removed from the 2011 edition due to the publisher no longer having a license. First editions can sell on eBay for 12 times their original price.

== Influence ==
External videos
- 2018 interview with Pamela Clark
- Pamela Clark demonstrates how to make "The train cake"

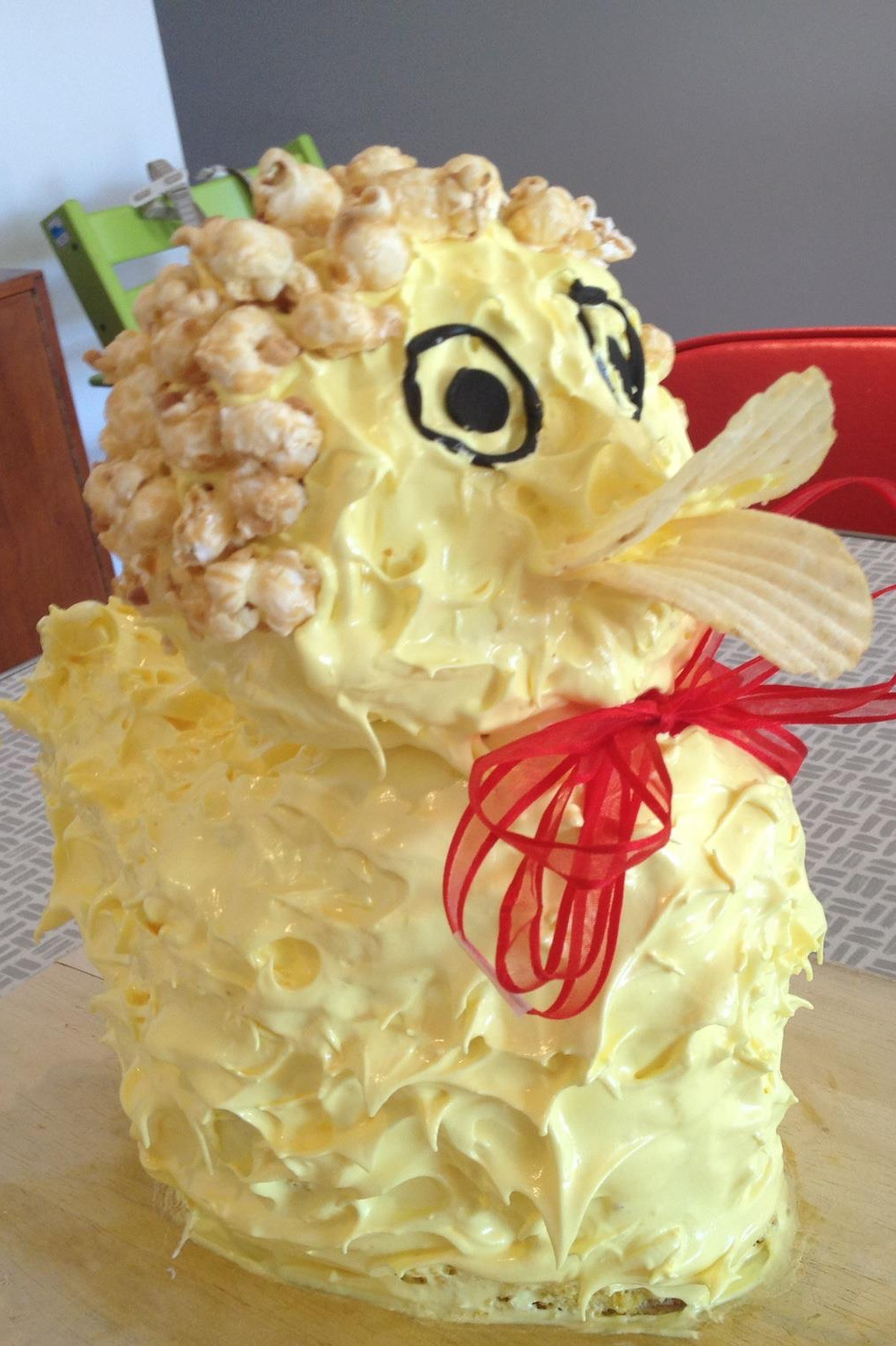
Recreation of the "rubber ducky" cake

Australian demographer Bernard Salt has suggested that the book modernised and "grandified" children's birthday party culture in Australia. The author, Pamela Clark, has said that children would take the book to bed with them as bedtime reading, choosing which cake their parents would make for them, and the publisher's test kitchen had a dedicated, much-used telephone helpline for parents making the cakes to a deadline.

Because of the appealing decorative effects of the cakes, the book has garnered a nostalgic cult following, including social media fan groups and projects to reproduce each cake. In 2009, stand-up comedian Josh Earl included reference to the "train cake" in his routine. The segment was so popular he expanded it and the following year launched Josh Earl vs. the Australian Women's Weekly Children's Birthday Cake Book, a show that continued through to 2015. In 2016, all 107 cakes were baked and sold for a Canberra charity to raise money to support women with post- and ante-natal depression. In 2018, New Zealand–born photographer Henry Hargreaves created an exhibition in Wellington called "Birthdays that will never come", celebrating children who would never have birthdays in New Zealand, by combining children's names that are banned in New Zealand with the "very 80s aesthetic" of the cakes in the cookbook, familiar to him from childhood.

In a September 2018 interview on Throwback: Our Childhoods Revisited series, co-author Pamela Clark noted the heirloom quality of the cookbook, with old copies being passed down in families for generations of cake-making.

In 2020, the book turned 40, and Clark noted that its 106 recipes have been birthday party staples ever since its first publication. Despite the elaborate cakes featured on the internet, "you get these ... daggy cakes ... and they're more popular than all of the upmarket ones." In the first half of 2020, in the context of the COVID-19 pandemic in Australia, sales of the book increased by about 30%. The change was attributed to people being more at home as well as feelings of nostalgia in difficult times. Jacinda Ardern, at the time New Zealand's Prime Minister, publicly documented her own rendition of the "piano cake" for her daughter's 2nd birthday. Also that year, the book and, specifically, the difficult-to-make "duck cake", were the subject of an episode of the popular Australian children's television show Bluey, which was then recreated by celebrity chef Andrew Rea in 2024. In 2023, the Bendigo Art Gallery curated a temporary exhibition about the cultural impact of the Australian Women's Weekly, for which they received over 3,000 community-submitted images of cakes produced from the book.
