= Sagmeister =

Sagmeister is a surname shared by several people:

- Franz Sagmeister (born 1974), German Olympic bobsledder
- Michael Sagmeister (born 1959), German jazz guitarist
- Mojca Sagmeister (born 1996), Slovenian swimmer
- Stefan Sagmeister (born 1962), Austrian-American graphic designer and typographer
