= Dolly Varden (painting) =

Painting by William Powell Frith

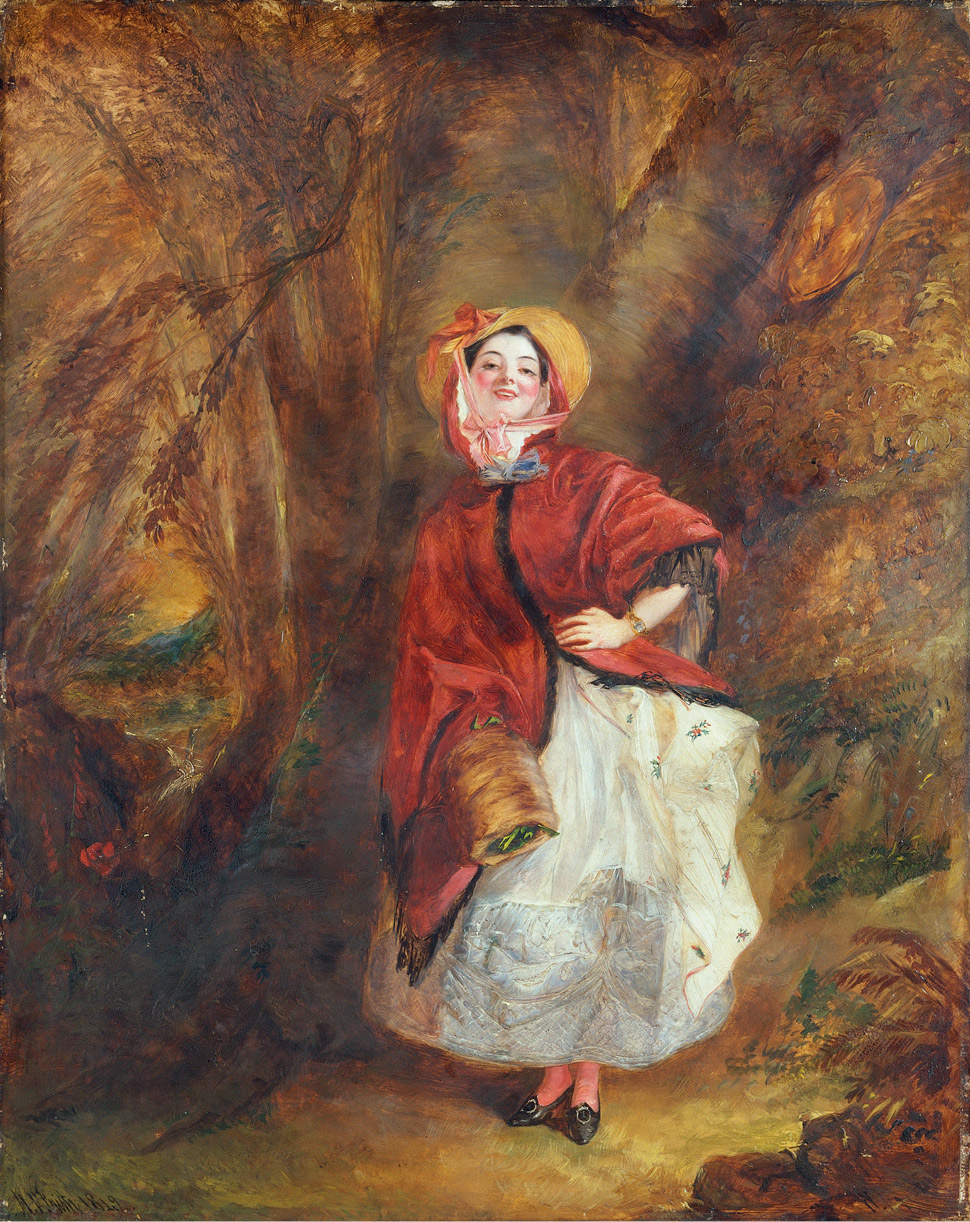
- Artist: William Powell Frith
- Year: 1842
- Type: Oil on canvas
- Dimensions: 54.6 cm × 44.5 cm (21.5 in × 17.5 in)
- Location: Victoria and Albert Museum, London

Dolly Varden is an oil on canvas painting by the English artist William Powell Frith, from 1842. It features the fictional character of Dolly Varden from the novel Barnaby Rudge (1841) by Charles Dickens.

During the early Victorian era there was a fashion for paintings based on works of theatre and literature, generally featuring popular characters and scenes. Barnaby Rudge was Dickens fifth published novel. It takes place around the time of the Gordon Riots in 1780. Frith, a member of the art group known as The Clique, first met Dickens at the time of the painting. The two men established a friendship that lasted until the author's death in 1870.

The work was exhibited at the Society of British Artists. Frith painted at least four versions of the painting, including one for Dickens himself. The best known of these is now in the Victoria and Albert Museum in South Kensington, London.

== Bibliography ==
- Bills, Mark & Knight, Vivien (ed.) William Powell Frith: Painting the Victorian Age. Yale University Press, 2006
- Gordon, Catherine May. British Paintings of Subjects from the English Novel, 1740–1870. Garland, 1988.
- Green, Richard & Sellars, Jane. William Powell Frith: The People's Painter. Bloomsbury, 2019.
- Wood, Christopher. William Powell Frith: A Painter and His World. Sutton Publishing, 2006.
