= Barnaby Rudge =

1841 novel by Charles Dickens

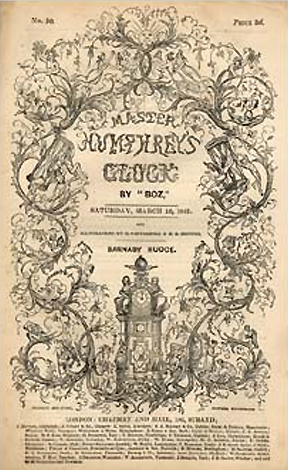
- Cover of the magazine Master Humphrey's Clock where the novel was serialised
- Author: Charles Dickens ("Boz")
- Original title: Barnaby Rudge: A Tale of the Riots of Eighty
- Illustrator: George Cattermole; Hablot Knight Browne (Phiz)
- Language: English
- Genre: Novel
- Published: Serialised: February–November 1841; as a book 1841
- Publisher: Chapman & Hall
- Publication place: England
- Media type: Print (serial, hardback, and paperback)
- Preceded by: The Old Curiosity Shop
- Followed by: Martin Chuzzlewit

Barnaby Rudge: A Tale of the Riots of Eighty (commonly known as Barnaby Rudge) is a historical novel by English novelist Charles Dickens. Barnaby Rudge was one of two novels (the other was The Old Curiosity Shop) that Dickens published in his short-lived (1840–1841) weekly serial Master Humphrey's Clock. Barnaby Rudge is largely set during the Gordon Riots of 1780.

Barnaby Rudge was the fifth of Dickens's novels to be published. It had initially been planned to appear as his first, but changes of publisher led to many delays, and it first appeared in serial form in the Clock from February to November 1841.

It was Dickens's first historical novel. His only other is A Tale of Two Cities (1859), also set in revolutionary times. Barnaby Rudge is one of his less popular novels; British historian and Dickens biographer Peter Ackroyd has called it "one of Dickens's most neglected, but most rewarding, novels".

It has rarely been adapted for film or television. The last production was a 1960 BBC production. Prior to that, silent films were made in 1911 and 1915.

== Plot summary ==
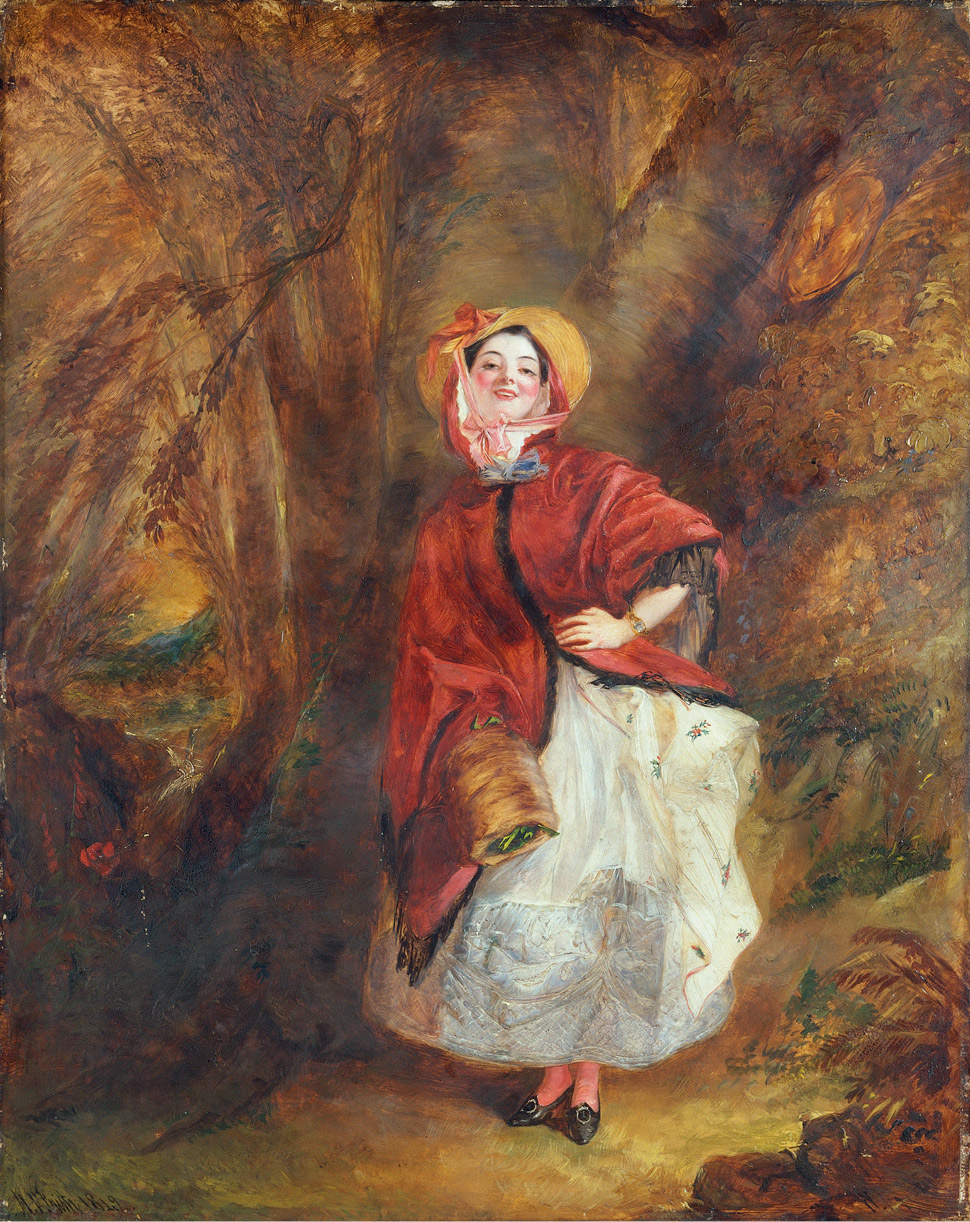
Dolly Varden as painted by William Powell Frith, 1842

Gathered around the fire at the Maypole Inn, in the village of Chigwell, on an evening of foul weather in the year 1775, are John Willet, proprietor of the Maypole, and his three cronies. One of the three, Solomon Daisy, tells an ill-kempt stranger at the inn a well-known local tale of the murder of Reuben Haredale which had occurred 22 years earlier on that very day. Reuben had been the owner of the Warren, a local estate which is now the residence of Geoffrey, the deceased Reuben's brother, and Geoffrey's niece, Reuben's daughter Emma Haredale. After the murder, Reuben's gardener and steward went missing and were suspects in the crime. A body was later found and identified as that of the steward, so the gardener was assumed to be the murderer.

Joe Willet, son of the Maypole proprietor, quarrels with his father because John treats 20-year-old Joe as a child. Finally having had enough of this ill-treatment, Joe leaves the Maypole and goes for a soldier, stopping to say goodbye to the woman he loves, Dolly Varden, daughter of London locksmith Gabriel Varden. He initially asks her to come with him and be his wife, but being "a spoilt child", she shallowly rejects Joe's proposal, despite his previously having risked his own life to save her from an assault by the lecherous Hugh.

Meanwhile, Edward Chester is in love with Emma Haredale. Both Edward's father, Sir John Chester, and Emma's uncle, the Catholic Geoffrey Haredale – these two are sworn enemies – oppose the union after Sir John untruthfully convinces Geoffrey that Edward's intentions are dishonourable. Sir John intends to marry Edward to a woman with a rich inheritance, to support John's expensive lifestyle and to pay off his creditors. Similar to Joe, Edward quarrels with his father and leaves home for the West Indies.

Barnaby Rudge, an "innocent", wanders in and out of the story with his pet raven, Grip. Barnaby's mother begins to receive visits from the ill-kempt stranger, whom she feels compelled to protect. She later gives up the annuity she had been receiving from Geoffrey Haredale and, without explanation, takes Barnaby and leaves the city hoping to escape the unwanted visitor.

The story advances five years to a chilly evening in early 1780. On the 27th anniversary of Reuben Haredale's murder, Solomon Daisy, winding the bell tower clock, sees a ghost in the churchyard. He reports this hair-raising event to his friends at the Maypole, and John Willet decides that Geoffrey Haredale should hear the story. He departs in a winter storm taking the sinister Hugh, hostler of the Maypole, as a guide. On the way back to the Maypole, John and Hugh are met by three men seeking the way to London. Finding that London is still 13 miles off, the men seek refuge for the night. Beds are prepared for them at the Maypole.

Lord George Gordon, head of the Protestant Association

These visitors prove to be Lord George Gordon; his secretary, Gashford; and a servant, John Grueby. Lord George makes an impassioned speech full of anti-papist sentiment, arguing (among other things) that Catholics in the military would, given a chance, join forces with their co-religionists on the Continent and attack Britain. Next day the three depart for London, inciting anti-Catholic sentiment along the way and recruiting Protestant volunteers, from whom Ned Dennis, the hangman of Tyburn, and the ill-mannered Simon Tappertit, former apprentice to Gabriel Varden, are chosen as leaders. Hugh, finding a handbill left at the Maypole Inn, joins the Protestant throng which Dickens describes as "sprinkled doubtless here and there with honest zealots, but composed for the most part of the very scum and refuse of London, whose growth was fostered by bad criminal laws, bad prison regulations, and the worst conceivable police."

Barnaby and his mother have been living quietly in a country village, their whereabouts unknown despite Geoffrey Haredale's attempts to find them. The mysterious stranger finds them and sends Stagg, a blind man, to attempt to get money from them. Barnaby and his mother then flee to London, hoping to lose their pursuers again.

When Barnaby and his mother arrive at Westminster Bridge, they see an unruly crowd heading for a meeting on the Surrey side of the river. Barnaby is duped into joining them, despite his mother's pleas. The rioters then march on Parliament and burn several Catholic churches and the homes of Catholic families.

A detachment led by Hugh and Dennis head for Chigwell, intent on exacting revenge on Geoffrey Haredale, leaving Barnaby to guard The Boot, the tavern they use as their headquarters. The mob loots the Maypole Inn on their way to the Warren, then they burn the Warren to the ground. Emma Haredale and Dolly Varden (now Emma's companion) are taken captive by the rioters, much to Hugh's delight. Soldiers take Barnaby prisoner; he is held in Newgate, which the mob plans to storm.

Haredale captures the mysterious stranger haunting Mrs. Rudge at the smoldering ruins of the Warren. He turns out to be Barnaby Rudge Sr., the steward who had murdered Reuben Haredale and his gardener years earlier. It is revealed that he had switched clothes with the dead gardener to divert suspicion from himself.

The rioters capture Gabriel Varden, with the help of his wife's maid Miggs, and attempt to have the locksmith help them break into Newgate to release prisoners. He refuses and is rescued by two men, one of whom has only one arm. The rioters then burn Newgate where Barnaby and his father are being held. All of the prisoners escape, but Barnaby, his father, and Hugh are later betrayed by Dennis the hangman and captured by soldiers. Dennis has changed sides, believing he will obtain the bounty offered for them as well as numerous clients needing his special talents. With the army patrolling the streets, the rioters scatter, and many are killed.

The one-armed man turns out to be Joe Willet, who has returned from fighting against the American revolutionaries. Joe and Edward Chester turn out to be the rescuers of Gabriel Varden. The pair then rescue Dolly and Emma.

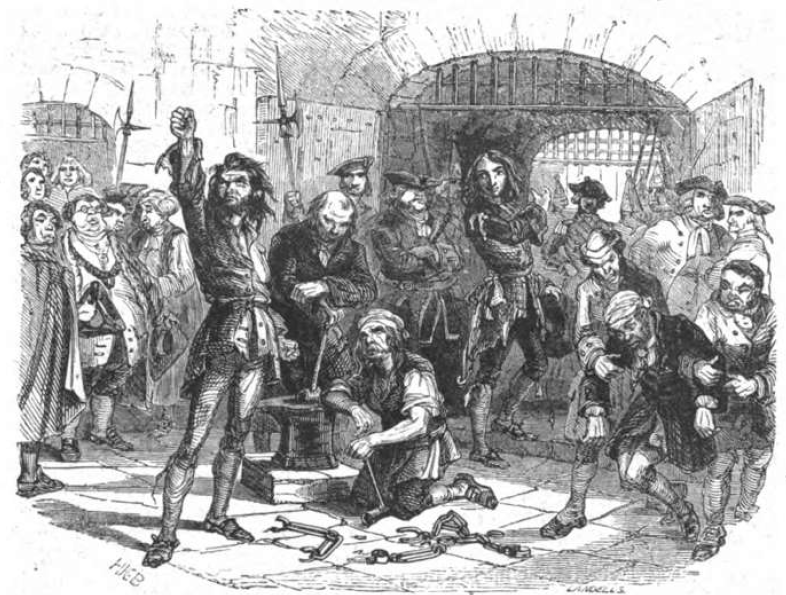
"Hugh and Dennis five minutes before execution" (book illustration)

Dennis is arrested and sentenced to die with Hugh and Barnaby. Hugh and Dennis are hanged. Barnaby, through the efforts of Gabriel Varden, is pardoned.

Joe and the now-grateful Dolly are married and become proprietors of the rebuilt Maypole. Edward Chester and Emma are married and go to the West Indies. Miggs tries to get her position back at the Varden household, is rejected, and becomes a jailer at a women's prison. Simon Tappertit, his legs crushed in the riots, becomes a shoe-black. Gashford later commits suicide. Lord George Gordon is held in the Tower and is then judged to be innocent of inciting the riots. Sir John Chester, now a member of parliament, turns out to be the father of Hugh (Sir John had never revealed to his own son Edward that Hugh was his brother) and is killed in a duel by Geoffrey Haredale. Haredale escapes to the continent where he ends his days in a monastery. Barnaby and his mother live out their years tending a farm at the Maypole Inn where Barnaby can work effectively due to his physical strength.

== Characters ==
- The Rudges – Barnaby, a simple man, his loving mother Mary, and his companion Grip, the loquacious raven
- The Willets – Old John, the keeper of the Maypole Inn, and his kindly son Joe
- The Vardens – Gabriel, the locksmith, his manipulative wife Martha, and his beautiful daughter Dolly Varden
- The Chesters – the villainous Sir John, Esquire, M.P. (Member of Parliament) and his innocent son Edward
- The Haredales – Mr Geoffrey Haredale (younger brother of the murdered Reuben), and his niece (Reuben's daughter) Emma
- Hugh – the sinister hostler of the Maypole Inn, later revealed to be the illegitimate son of Sir John Chester
- Lord George Gordon (a fictionalisation of the historical personality), his loyal servant John Grueby, and his obsequious and duplicitous secretary Mr Gashford
- Simon Tappertit – Gabriel Varden's temperish apprentice, and Miggs, Mrs Varden's shrewish housemaid
- Ned Dennis – the hangman of Tyburn
- The mysterious stranger, ultimately revealed to be Barnaby Rudge Sr, the steward and murderer of Reuben Haredale
- Stagg – the crafty blind man
- Solomon Daisy, "Long" Phil Parkes, and Tom Cobb, Old John's three cronies
- Mr Langdale – Kindly vintner and distiller in Holborn based on an historical figure. The Catholic Langdale shelters Geoffrey Haredale from the rioters. His home and warehouse are burned in the riots, his stores of spirits are consumed by the mob. A very hearty old fellow and a worthy man, often described as a "purple-faced old vintner"

== Allusions and references in other works ==
The character Grip was based on a raven kept as a pet by Dickens. Grip, the raven in Barnaby Rudge, inspired Edgar Allan Poe to write his most famous poem, "The Raven".

Dickens based the Maypole Tavern on the Kings Head, Chigwell, a 17th-century public house, situated on High Road, opposite the entrance to Roding Lane.

In ‘A Glastonbury Romance’ by John Cowper Powys, the character John Crow is found muttering ‘I’m a devil!’ over and over again ‘without a thought of Barnaby Rudge’s raven’.

== Adaptations ==
Thomas Higgie adapted it into a three-act play in 1854. Charles Selby and Charles Melville did the same in 1875. The latter was produced at the English Opera House.

In 1915 Thomas Bentley directed Barnaby Rudge, "the biggest-budget British film of its day", but it is now lost.

The BBC made a 13-episode TV series in 1960.

Barnaby Rudge was re-invented as a stage play, The Locksmith of London, by Eileen Norris. It was staged in 2012 at the Kings Theatre, Southsea, by Alchemy Theatre, where the Dickens Fellowship attended a performance during their annual conference.

BBC Radio 4 broadcast a three part adaptation in the Classic Serial slot in 1995. It starred Richard Derrington in the title role, alongside Richard Pasco, Norman Rodway, and Ian Hogg.The production was dramatized by Elizabeth Proud, directed by Sue Wilson, and featured original music composed by Malcolm McKee.

BBC Radio 4 again chose it for their Classic Serial in 2014, and cast an actor with Down syndrome, Daniel Laurie, in the title role.

== See also ==
- Political fiction
- Dolly Varden (disambiguation)
